= Głębokie Lake =

Lake in Poland

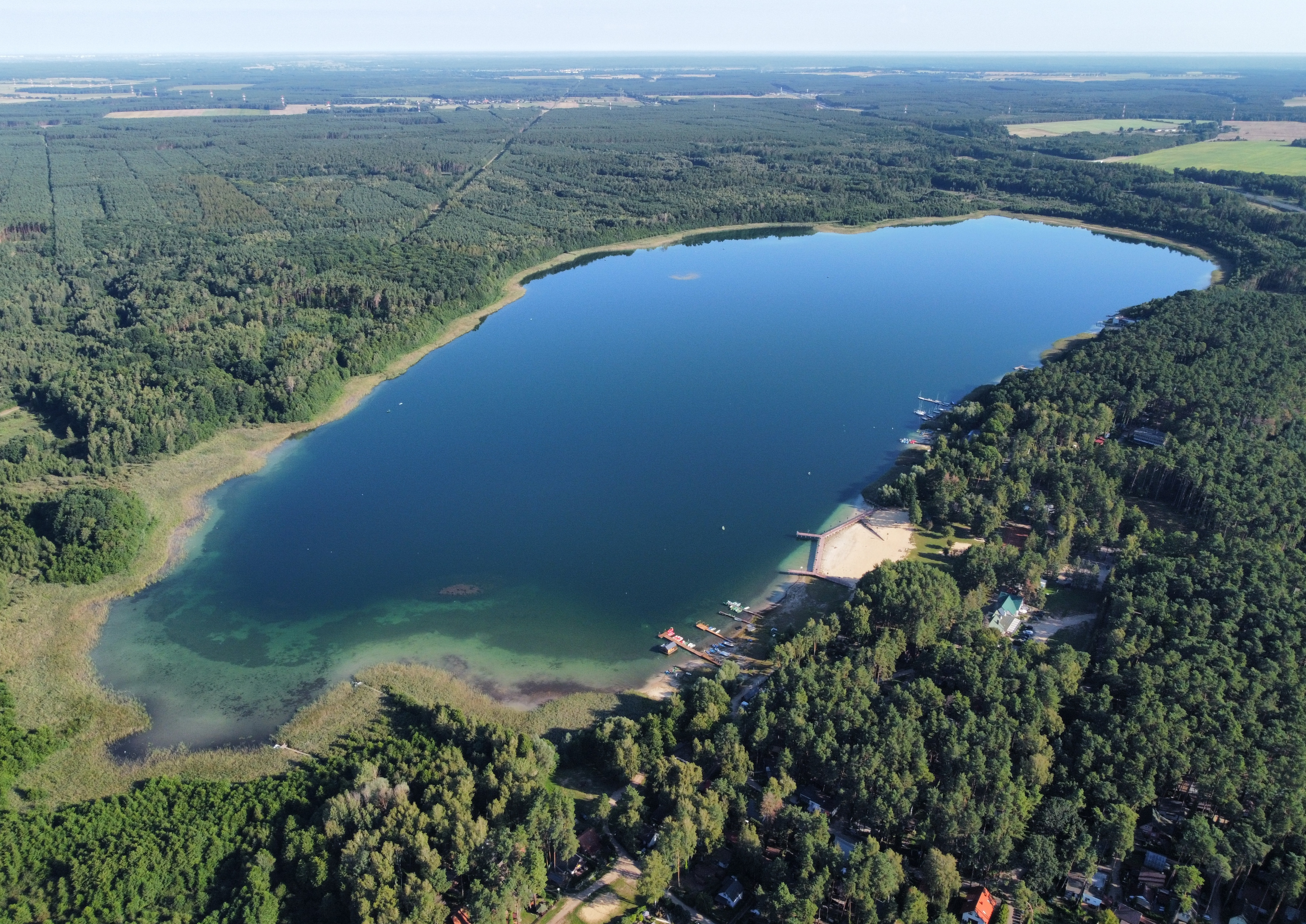
- Głębokie Lake, aerial view (2023)
- Interactive map of Głębokie Lake
- Location: Zbąszyń Ridge, Poland
- Coordinates: 52°29′37″N 15°32′23″E
- Type: Ribbon lake
- Max. length: 2.28 km (1.42 mi)
- Max. width: 825 m (2,707 ft)
- Surface area: 112.5–124.9 ha (278–309 acres)
- Average depth: 9.2 m (30 ft)
- Max. depth: 25.3 m (83 ft)
- Water volume: 11,530.4 m^{3} (407,190 cu ft)
- Shore length^{1}: 5.8 km (3.6 mi)
- ^{1} Shore length is not a well-defined measure.

Głębokie Lake is a lake in the Lubusz Voivodeship, in the Międzyrzecz County, in the Gmina Międzyrzecz, approximately 5 km north of Międzyrzecz, located in the area of the Lubusz Lakeland and within the drainage basin of the Obra river. It is the largest non-drainage lake in the Lubusz Voivodeship.

== Location and description ==
Głębokie Lake is located in the western part of the Zbąszyń Ridge. The shores of the lake are mainly covered with coniferous forests. The northern and southern shores are marshy and boggy, while the higher eastern shore is occupied by recreational development. The shoreline of the body of water is poorly developed. The lake bottom is not very diverse, with very high water transparency, which promotes the growth of underwater vegetation. Głębokie has no permanent inflows or outflows. Next to the southern shore of the lake, there is the Głębokie Międzyrzeckie railway station (Zbąszynek–Gorzów Wielkopolski railway line connecting Zbąszynek and Gorzów Wielkopolski). To the east, at a short distance from the lake, runs the Expressway S3.

== Hydronymics ==
The name of the lake appears in sources in 1321 as stagnum Glambek, and then as Glabok (1390), Glamboke (1418), Glembuch-see (1929), and Tiefer See (1934). On 17 September 1949, the name Głębokie (English: Deep) was introduced. Currently, the national register of geographic names also lists Głębokie as the name of the lake, while also providing the alternative name Jezioro Głębokie (English: Deep Lake).

== Morphometrics ==
According to data from the Inland Fisheries Institute, the surface area of the lake water mirror is 124.9 hectares (309 acres), while A. Choiński, through mapping on 1:50,000 scale maps, determined the size of the lake to be 112.5 hectares (278 acres). The uniform part of the lake's surface waters has an area of 115 hectares (280 acres).

The average depth of the water reservoir is 9.2 metres (30 ft), and the maximum depth is 25.3 metres (83 ft). The volume of the lake is 11,530.4 cubic metres (407,190 cu ft). The maximum length of the lake is 2,280 metres (7,480 ft), and the width is 825 metres (2,707 ft). The length of the shoreline is 5,800 metres (19,000 ft).

According to the Atlas of Polish Lakes (ed. J. Jańczak, 1996), the water level is at an altitude of 50.4 metres (165 ft) above sea level, while according to the digital terrain model provided by Geoportal, the water level is at an altitude of 49.3 metres (162 ft) above sea level.

According to the Map of the Hydrographic Division of Poland, the lake is located in the drainage basin of the sixth level – the drainage basin of the non-drainage Głębokie Lake. The Map of the Hydrographic Division of Poland identifier is 1878930. The direct drainage basin of the lake is small and covers an area of 5.7 square kilometres (2.2 sq mi).

== Development ==
In the water management system, the lake forms a uniform part of waters with the code PLLW10378. The Polish Angling Association District in Gorzów Wielkopolski manages the fishery on the lake. The lake is inhabited by common bream (Abramis brama), vendace (Coregonus albula), common whitefish (Coregonus lavaretus), northern pike (Esox lucius), roach (Rutilus rutilus), tench (Tinca tinca), European perch (Perca fluviatilis), European eel (Anguilla anguilla), and common rudd (Scardinius erythrophthalmus).

The lake also serves recreational purposes, with a large recreation complex located on the eastern shore. Several centers offer bathing areas with piers, camping cabins, water sports equipment rental, and a forest camping area. The recreational buildings occupy about 15% of the lake's shoreline.

== Water purity and environmental protection ==
Based on research conducted in 1993 and 1999, the water of Głębokie Lake was classified as Class II purity. Studies conducted until 2013 indicated that the lake is one of the cleanest in the Lubusz Lakeland region. The values of biogenic indicators and chlorophyll a concentrations did not exceed the permissible values set for Class I. Both good chemical and biological conditions were observed, and there were no phytoplankton blooms in the lake. The high water transparency makes it attractive for tourism and recreation. Research from 2018 classified the lake's water quality as Class I, with a transparency of 5.7 metres (19 ft).

The latest studies from 2021 classified the water quality of the lake as Class II, with the condition of macrozoobenthos being the determining factor for this classification, while the condition of phytoplankton, macrophytes, ichthyofauna, and phytobenthos was assessed as very good. The water transparency of the lake was determined to be 4.8 metres (16 ft). Głębokie Lake, in terms of chlorophyll a content, was the cleanest of all lakes surveyed in the country that year. Chemically, the lake water was classified below a good condition due to exceeding Class I values for mercury compounds, polybrominated diphenyl ethers, and heptachlor.

Głębokie Lake is moderately susceptible to anthropogenic influences and has been classified as Class II in terms of susceptibility to degradation. Most indicators positively affect the lake's resistance to degradation, especially its high average depth, location among forests, minimal percentage of water exchange throughout the year, and small area of direct catchment. The only issues are the excessive length of the shoreline compared to the lake's volume and low thermal stratification of its waters.

The lake is not covered by any form of nature protection.

=== Drying up of the lake ===
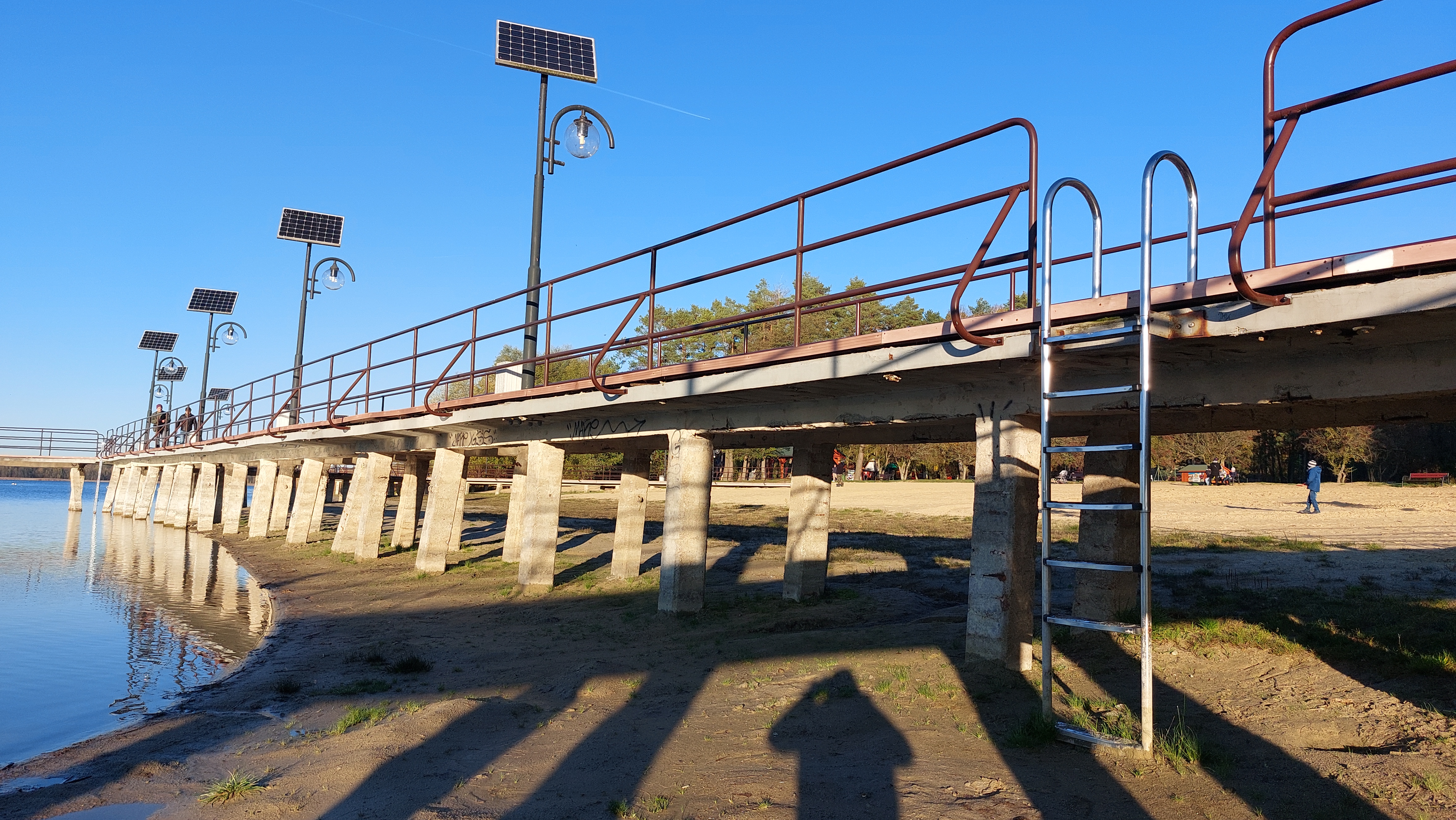
Water level in the lake in autumn 2022

Since the beginning of the 21st century, the water level in the lake has decreased by approximately 120 centimetres (47 in). The causes of this phenomenon are unknown; according to preliminary expert opinions, the inflowing tributaries supplying the lake have dried up, and there has likely been seepage of water towards the west. There is also a hypothesis that deep wells belonging to recreational centers located along the shores of Głębokie Lake are responsible for lowering the water level. The least mentioned hypothesis is the interruption of water flow from the main catchment area of the lake due to the construction of the Expressway S3 (European route E65) located near the eastern shore of the lake.

As remedial measures, it is proposed to bring water to the lake from the Obra river, either through a pumping system or through the surrounding wetlands. An alternative solution would be to bring water from deep wells by excavating the lake and allowing the water to slowly seep into it, which would require aeration due to low oxygen saturation.

== History ==
The water body was mentioned as early as 1390 when Wincenty of Chycina and his sons sold the villages of Kalsko and Rojewo along with five nearby lakes to the abbot and Cistercians in Zemsko for 300 grzywnas.

Głębokie Lake, along with the neighboring Lake Grążyk and the surrounding forests, were mentioned on 16 April 1485, in a privilege granted to Międzyrzecz by King Casimir IV Jagiellon. Thanks to this, the residents of the city could in accordance with ancient custom, fish in the lakes called Strzeleckie (now Głębokie) and Linye (Grążyk) with the consent of leasing, similarly to the river with nets. Both lakes had similar surfaces and were rich in fish. The shallower Grążyk abounded in tench, carp, and roach. In the neighboring Głębokie, the most valuable fish was the vendace.

In the 18th century, a long-standing dispute over both lakes and the surrounding forests ensued between Międzyrzecz and the abbot of the Cistercian monastery in Bledzew. The monastery had long owned forests and fields near the nearby Kalsko and asserted claims to the urban properties. When the abbot demanded to see the royal privilege, the city council on 10 October 1647, sent a delegation with the document to Bledzew. The monks received the city councilors very hospitably and organized a feast. When the intoxicated councilors fell asleep, the royal privilege was stolen from them, and they had to return home empty-handed. For several decades, Międzyrzecz lost the lakes and surrounding forests, and the residents complained for a long time that the lords had drunk away the forest with the lakes.

== Bibliography ==
- Kamińska, Krystyna, ed. (1996). Przyroda województwa gorzowskiego – życie jezior (in Polish). Gorzów Wielkopolski: Klub Działalności Podwodnej "MARLIN". ISBN 83-905760-1-5.
