= Katarzynki =

Katarzynki may refer to:

- Toruń gingerbread
- Katarzynki, Kuyavian-Pomeranian Voivodeship (north-central Poland)
- Katarzynki, Greater Poland Voivodeship (west-central Poland)
- Katarzynki, Lubusz Voivodeship (west Poland)
- Katarzynki, Pomeranian Voivodeship (north Poland)
- Katarzynki, Warmian-Masurian Voivodeship (north Poland)
