= Tatary (disambiguation) =

Tatary, or Tartary, was a historical region of Asia.

Crim Tatary is an archaic English expression for Crimea or the Crimean Khanate.

Tatary may also refer to the following Tatar villages:

- Tatary, Greater Poland Voivodeship (west-central Poland)
- Tatary, Masovian Voivodeship (east-central Poland)
- Tatary, Podlaskie Voivodeship (north-east Poland)
- Tatary, Gołdap County in Warmian-Masurian Voivodeship (north Poland)
- Tatary, Nidzica County in Warmian-Masurian Voivodeship (north Poland)
