= Psie Pole (disambiguation) =

Psie Pole is a former city district of Wrocław, Poland.

Psie Pole or Hundsfeld may also refer to the following populated places in Poland:

- Psie Pole (Wrocław neighborhood), former neighborhood (osiedle) of Wrocław
- Psie Pole (city), former city (now part of Wrocław) known as the place of the Battle of Psie Pole of 1109
- Psie Pole, Greater Poland Voivodeship

== See also ==
- Psie Pole-Zawidawie, administrative district of Wrocław established in 2004
