= Biały Dwór =

Biały Dwór may refer to the following places:

- Biały Dwór, Greater Poland Voivodeship (west-central Poland)
- Biały Dwór, Masovian Voivodeship (east-central Poland)
- Biały Dwór, Lidzbark County in Warmian-Masurian Voivodeship (north Poland)
- Biały Dwór, West Pomeranian Voivodeship (north-west Poland)
