= Osiecko, Lubusz Voivodeship =

Osiecko
- Village
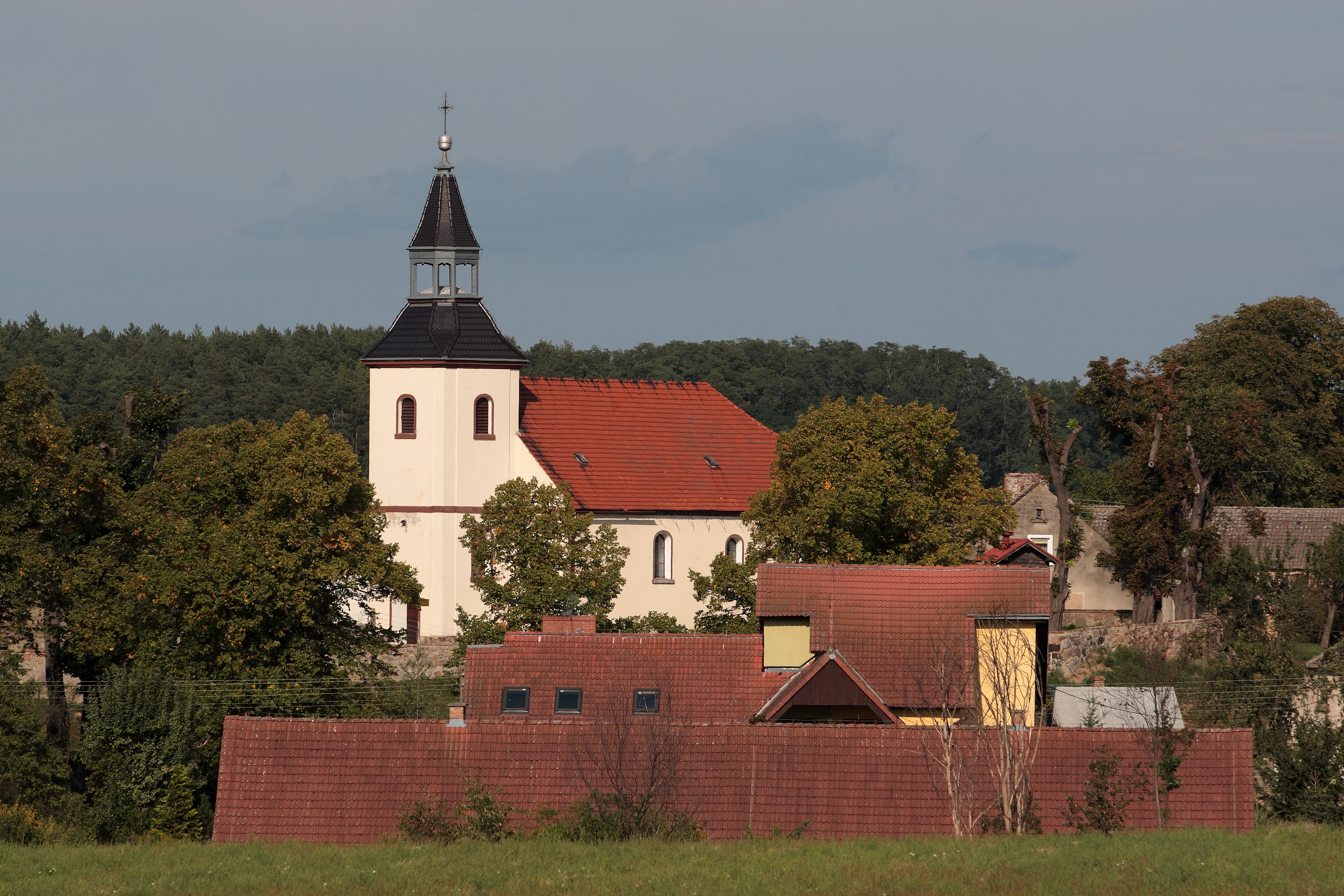
- St Nicholas Church

- Location within Poland
- Coordinates: 52°31′N 15°17′E
- Country: Poland
- Voivodeship: Lubusz
- County: Międzyrzecz
- Gmina: Bledzew
- Population: 420

Osiecko [ɔˈɕɛt͡skɔ] is a village in the administrative district of Gmina Bledzew, within Międzyrzecz County, Lubusz Voivodeship, in western Poland.

== History ==
The settlement was first mentioned as Magnum Oszec in a 1312 deed, when the area around Bledzew was temporarily under the rule of the Ascanian margraves of Brandenburg in the west. From about 1320 until the Partitions of Poland in the late 18th century, Osiecko belonged to the Greater Polish Poznań Voivodeship. In 1360 it was a possession of the Cistercian abbey at Zemsko. Located immediately at the border with the Brandenburgian New March region, it was one of the westernmost localities of the Polish–Lithuanian Commonwealth.

It was incorporated into the Meseritz district of South Prussia in the course of the 1793 Second Partition. After the Franco-Prussian Treaty of Tilsit in 1807, it was part of the Poznań Department in the newly established Duchy of Warsaw. Upon the 1815 Vienna Congress, Osiecko belonged to Kreis Birnbaum in the Prussian Grand Duchy of Posen, from 1887 to Kreis Schwerin. After World War I, Oscht with the Posen-West Prussia frontier region remained with the German Weimar Republic according to the Treaty of Versailles.

Osiecko returned to the Republic of Poland after World War II as stipulated by the Allied Potsdam Agreement and the German population was expelled.
