= Chycina =

- Village
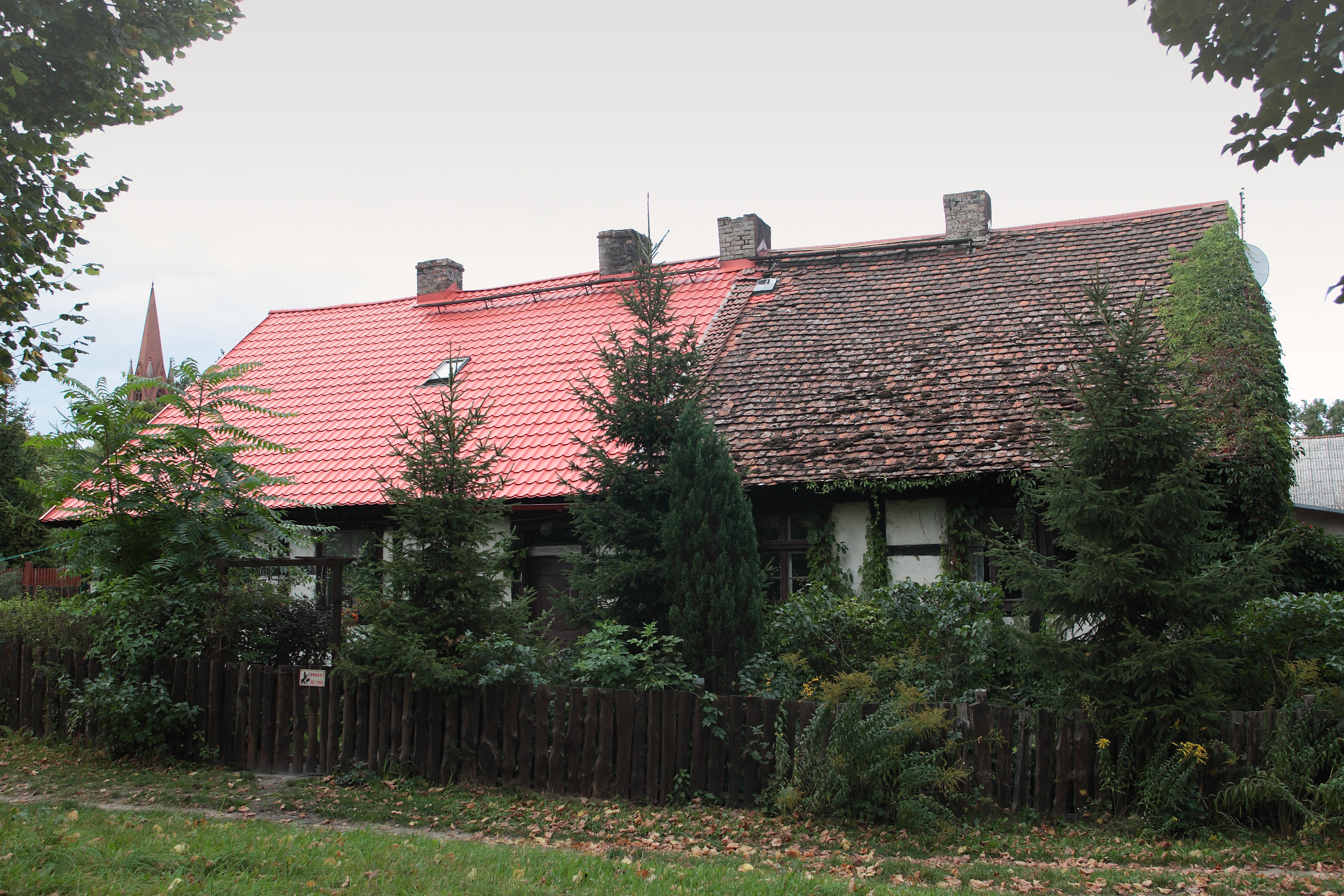
- Manor in Chycina, with the spire of the Immaculate Conception church visible to the left of it

- Location within Poland
- Coordinates: 52°29′N 15°26′E
- Country: Poland
- Voivodeship: Lubusz
- County: Międzyrzecz
- Gmina: Bledzew
- Time zone: UTC+1 (CET)
  - Summer (DST): UTC+2 (CEST)
- Postal code: 66-350
- Vehicle registration: FMI

Chycina [xɨˈt͡ɕina] is a village in the administrative district of Gmina Bledzew, within Międzyrzecz County, Lubusz Voivodeship, in western Poland. It is situated on the shore of Chycina Lake, approximately 5 km (3 mi) southeast of Bledzew and 12 km (7 mi) west of Międzyrzecz.

The village is known for the Summer Sports Center of the Poznan University School of Physical Education.

Chycina was a private village, administratively located in the Poznań County in the Poznań Voivodeship in the Greater Poland Province of the Kingdom of Poland.
