= Gmina Bledzew =

Gmina Bledzew Bledzew Commune
- Gmina
- Flag Coat of arms

- Location within Poland
- Coordinates (Bledzew): 52°31′N 15°24′E
- Country: Poland
- Voivodeship: Lubusz
- County: Międzyrzecz
- Seat: Bledzew

Area
  - Total: 247.58 km^{2} (95.59 sq mi)

Population (2019-06-30)
  - Total: 4,382
  - Density: 17.70/km^{2} (45.84/sq mi)
- Website: www.bledzew.pl

Gmina Bledzew is a rural gmina (administrative district) in Międzyrzecz County, Lubusz Voivodeship, in western Poland. Its seat is the village of Bledzew, which lies approximately 15 kilometres (9 mi) north-west of Międzyrzecz, 27 km (17 mi) south-east of Gorzów Wielkopolski, and 65 km (40 mi) north of Zielona Góra.

The gmina covers an area of 247.58 square kilometres (95.6 sq mi), and as of 2019 its total population is 4,382.

== Villages ==
Gmina Bledzew contains the villages and settlements of Bledzew, Bledzewka, Chycina, Dębowiec, Elektrownia, Goruńsko, Katarzynki, Kleszczewo, Kryl, Krzywokleszcz, Małoszewo, Nowa Wieś, Osada Rybacka, Osiecko, Pniewo, Popowo, Sokola Dąbrowa, Stary Dworek, Strużyny, Templewko, Templewo, Tymiana and Zemsko.

== Neighbouring gminas ==
Gmina Bledzew is bordered by the gminas of Deszczno, Lubniewice, Międzyrzecz, Przytoczna, Skwierzyna and Sulęcin.

== Twin towns – sister cities ==
Gmina Bledzew is twinned with:

- Podelzig, Germany
