= Serafinów =

- Village
- Location within Poland
- Coordinates: 51°49′09″N 17°20′46″E
- Country: Poland
- Voivodeship: Greater Poland
- County: Krotoszyn
- Gmina: Koźmin Wielkopolski

Serafinów [sɛraˈfinuf] is a village in the administrative district of Gmina Koźmin Wielkopolski, within Krotoszyn County, Greater Poland Voivodeship, in west-central Poland.
