= Kryl, Lubusz Voivodeship =

Kryl
- Settlement
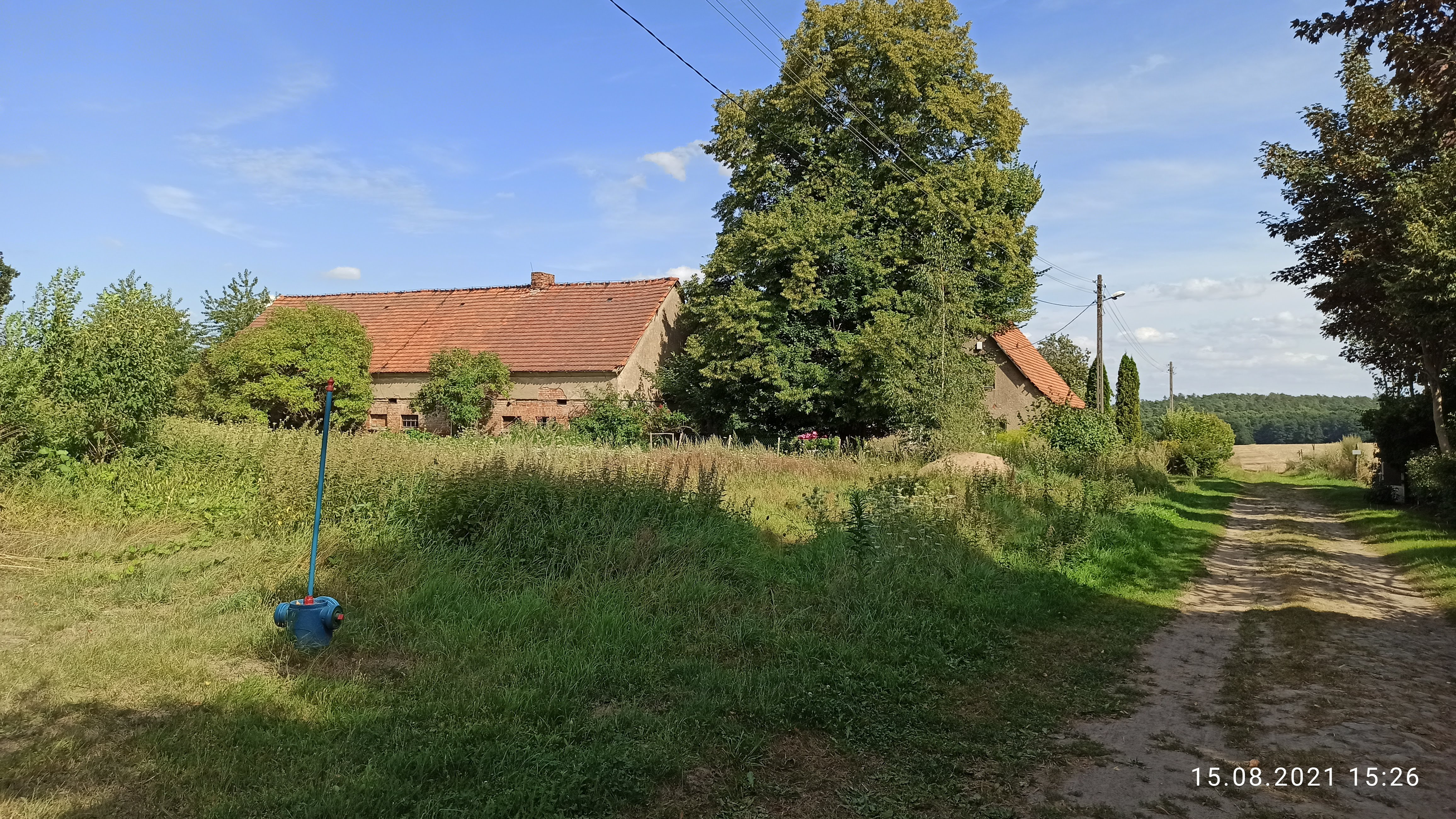

- Location within Poland
- Coordinates: 52°27′1″N 15°19′17″E
- Country: Poland
- Voivodeship: Lubusz
- County: Międzyrzecz
- Gmina: Bledzew
- Population: 5

Kryl [krɨl] is a settlement in the administrative district of Gmina Bledzew, within Międzyrzecz County, Lubusz Voivodeship, in western Poland.
