= Góreczki, Greater Poland Voivodeship =

Góreczki
- Village
- Location within Poland
- Coordinates: 51°52′28″N 17°20′35″E
- Country: Poland
- Voivodeship: Greater Poland
- County: Krotoszyn
- Gmina: Koźmin Wielkopolski

Góreczki [ɡuˈrɛt͡ʂki] is a village in the administrative district of Gmina Koźmin Wielkopolski, within Krotoszyn County, Greater Poland Voivodeship, in west-central Poland.
