= Dębowiec, Lubusz Voivodeship =

Dębowiec
- Village
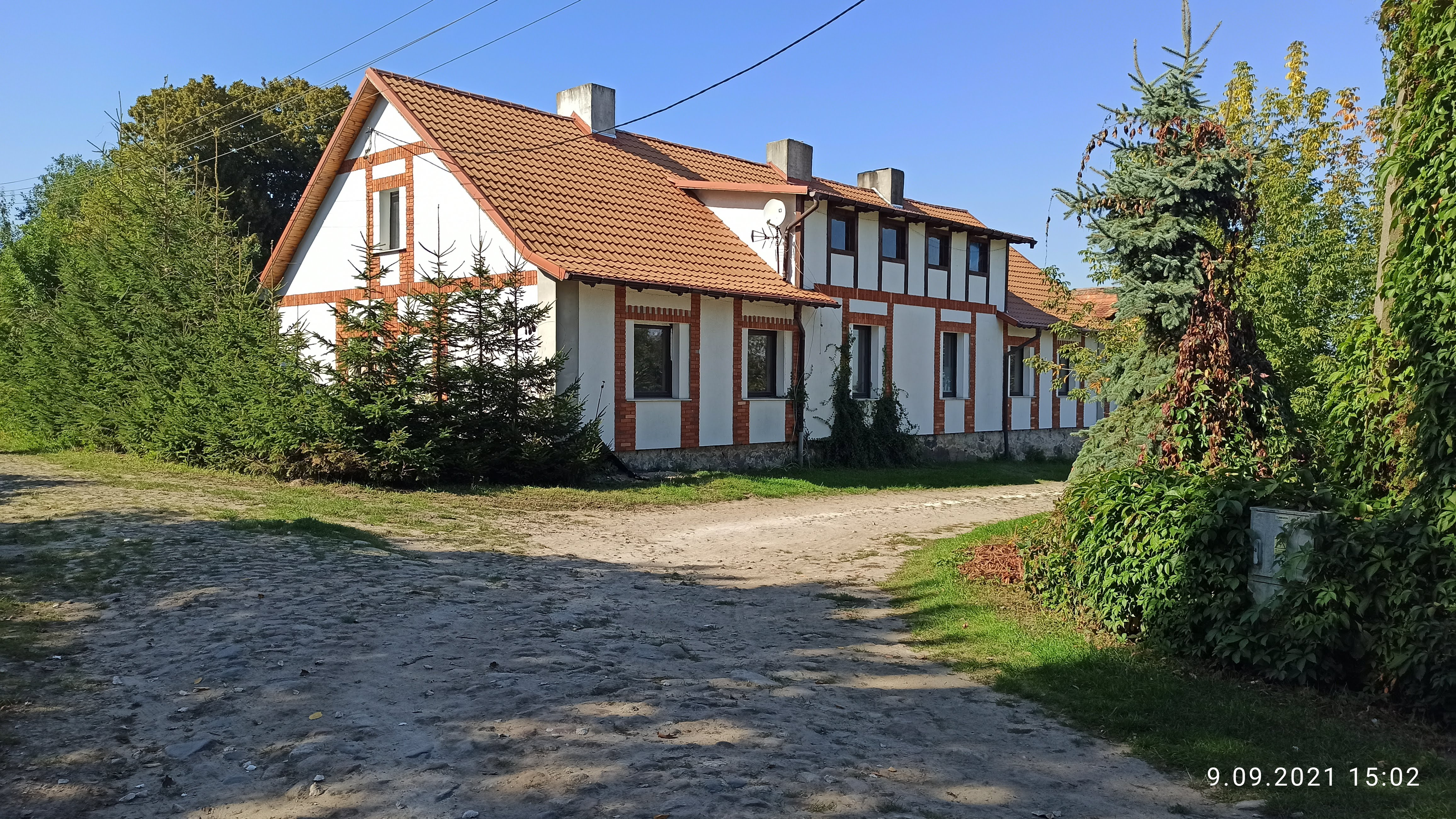

- Location within Poland
- Coordinates: 52°27′58″N 15°18′37″E
- Country: Poland
- Voivodeship: Lubusz
- County: Międzyrzecz
- Gmina: Bledzew
- Population: 43

Dębowiec [dɛmˈbɔvjɛt͡s] is a village in the administrative district of Gmina Bledzew, within Międzyrzecz County, Lubusz Voivodeship, in western Poland.
