= Borzęcice =

- Village
- Location within Poland
- Coordinates: 51°53′N 17°31′E
- Country: Poland
- Voivodeship: Greater Poland
- County: Krotoszyn
- Gmina: Koźmin Wielkopolski

Borzęcice [bɔʐɛnˈt͡ɕit͡sɛ] is a village in the administrative district of Gmina Koźmin Wielkopolski, within Krotoszyn County, Greater Poland Voivodeship, in west-central Poland.
