= Skałów =

Skalow
- Village
- Location within Poland
- Coordinates: 51°48′N 17°23′E
- Country: Poland
- Voivodeship: Greater Poland
- County: Krotoszyn
- Gmina: Koźmin Wielkopolski

Skałów [ˈskawuf] is a village in the administrative district of Gmina Koźmin Wielkopolski, within Krotoszyn County, Greater Poland Voivodeship, in west-central Poland.
