= Goruńsko =

- Village
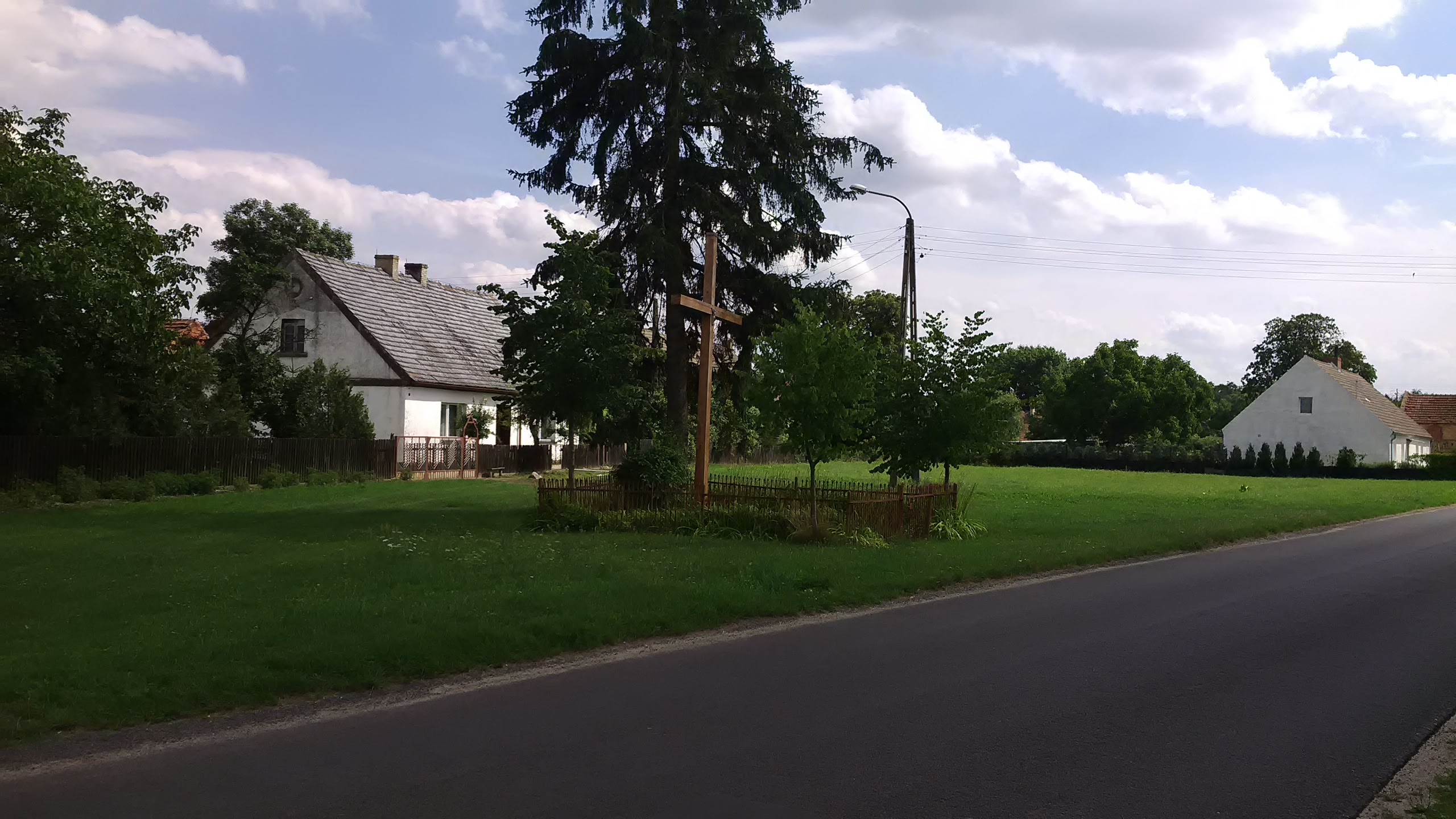
- Structures to the side of a road in Goruńsko

- Location within Poland
- Coordinates: 52°29′N 15°24′E
- Country: Poland
- Voivodeship: Lubusz
- County: Międzyrzecz
- Gmina: Bledzew
- Time zone: UTC+1 (CET)
  - Summer (DST): UTC+2 (CEST)
- Postal code: 66-350
- Vehicle registration: FMI

Goruńsko [ɡɔˈruɲskɔ] is a village in the administrative district of Gmina Bledzew, within Międzyrzecz County, Lubusz Voivodeship, in western Poland.

Goruńsko was a private village, administratively located in the Poznań County in the Poznań Voivodeship in the Greater Poland Province of the Kingdom of Poland.
