= Małoszewo, Lubusz Voivodeship =

Małoszewo
- Settlement
- Location within Poland
- Coordinates: 52°31′15″N 15°25′43″E
- Country: Poland
- Voivodeship: Lubusz
- County: Międzyrzecz
- Gmina: Bledzew
- Population: 4

Małoszewo [mawɔˈʂɛvɔ] is a settlement in the administrative district of Gmina Bledzew, within Międzyrzecz County, Lubusz Voivodeship, in western Poland.
