= Stary Dworek =

- Village
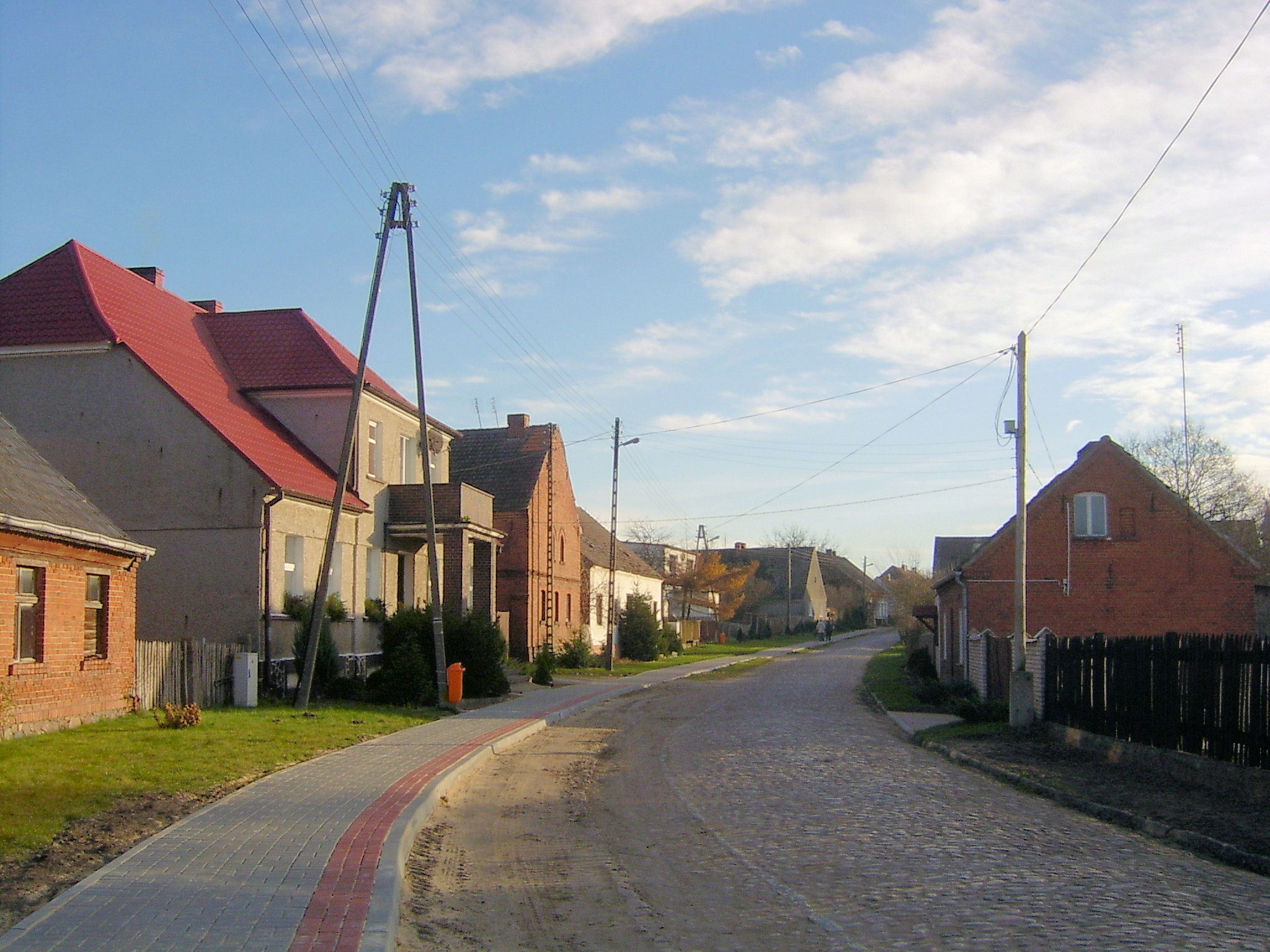
- Road in Stary Dworek

- Location within Poland
- Coordinates: 52°33′N 15°26′E
- Country: Poland
- Voivodeship: Lubusz
- County: Międzyrzecz
- Gmina: Bledzew

Population (approx.)
  - Total: 250
- Time zone: UTC+1 (CET)
  - Summer (DST): UTC+2 (CEST)
- Vehicle registration: FMI

Stary Dworek [ˈstarɨ ˈdvɔrɛk] is a village in the administrative district of Gmina Bledzew, within Międzyrzecz County, Lubusz Voivodeship, in western Poland.

Stary Dworek was a private church village, administratively located in the Poznań County in the Poznań Voivodeship in the Greater Poland Province of the Kingdom of Poland.
