= Tymiana =

- Settlement
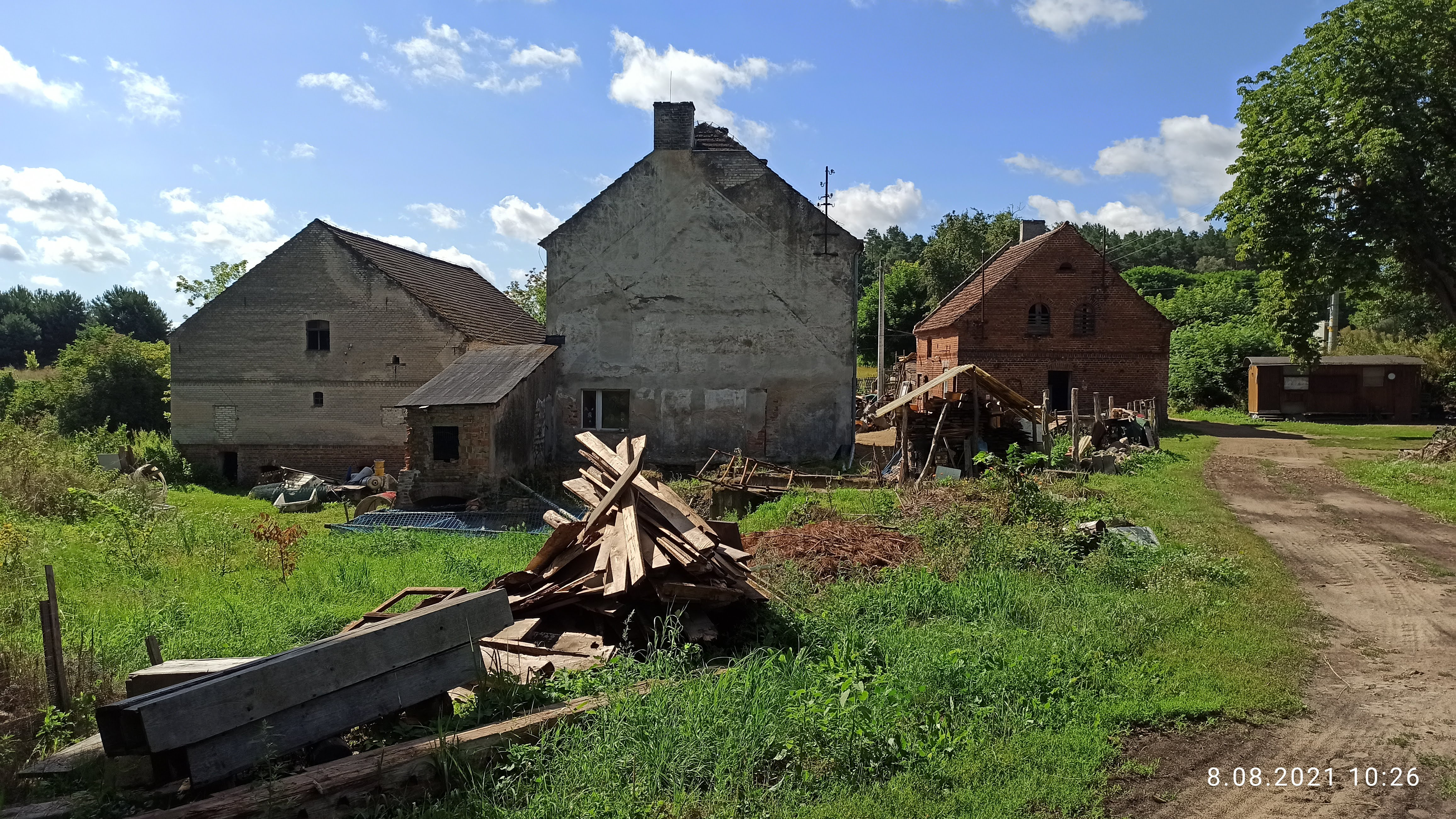

- Location within Poland
- Coordinates: 52°31′41″N 15°25′20″E
- Country: Poland
- Voivodeship: Lubusz
- County: Międzyrzecz
- Gmina: Bledzew
- Population: 12

Tymiana [tɨˈmjana] is a settlement in the administrative district of Gmina Bledzew, within Międzyrzecz County, Lubusz Voivodeship, in western Poland.
