= Józefów, Krotoszyn County =

Józefów
- Village
- Location within Poland
- Coordinates: 51°47′12″N 17°19′54″E
- Country: Poland
- Voivodeship: Greater Poland
- County: Krotoszyn
- Gmina: Koźmin Wielkopolski

Józefów (Polish: [juˈzɛfuf]) is a village in the administrative district of Gmina Koźmin Wielkopolski, within Krotoszyn County, Greater Poland Voivodeship, in west-central Poland.
