= Obra (river) =

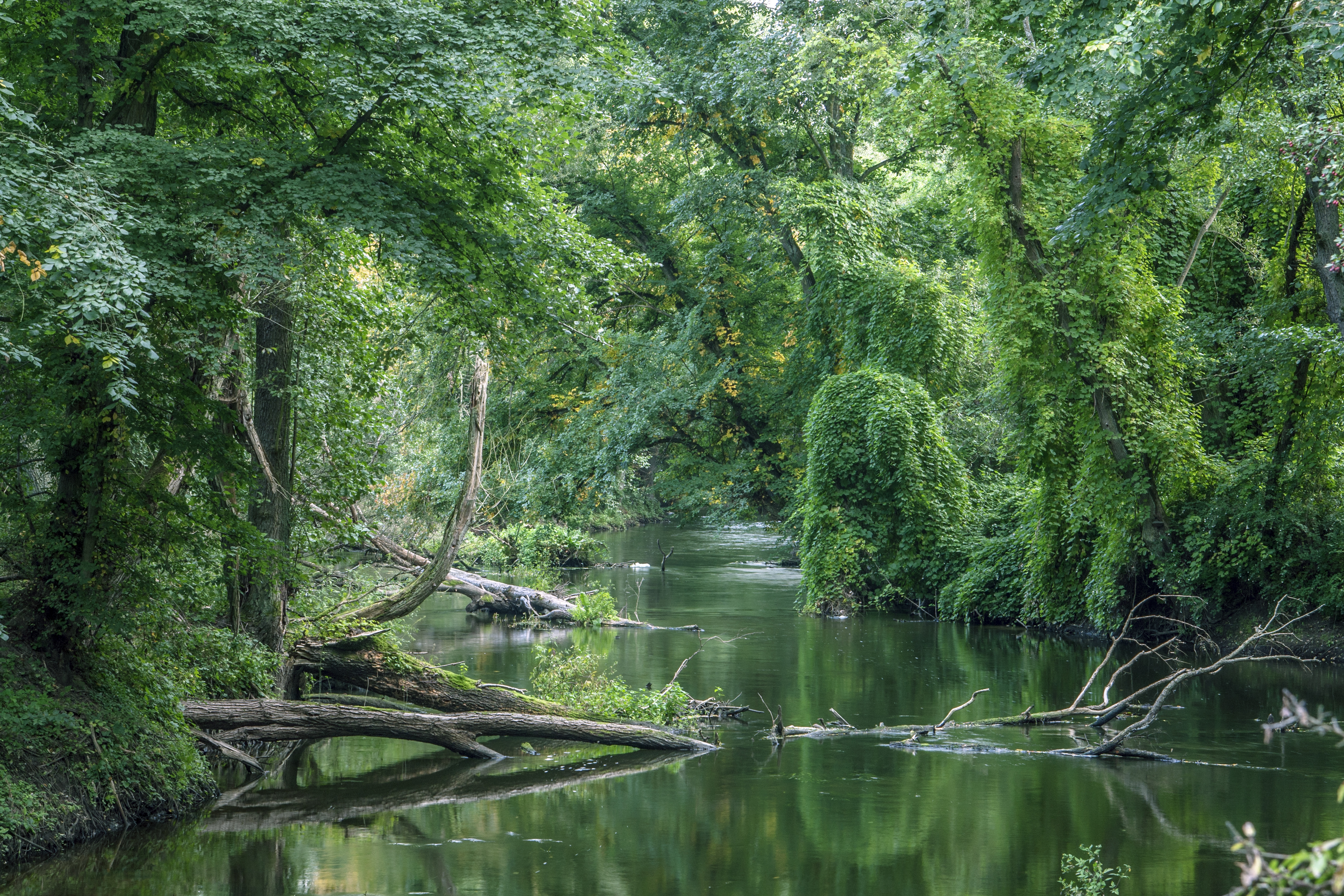
- Obra near Skwierzyna

Location
- Country: Poland

Physical characteristics
- Source
  - location: near Stara Obra
  - elevation: 140 m (460 ft)
- Mouth
  - location: Warta near Skwierzyna
  - coordinates: 52.6024°N 15.4789°E
- Length: 171 km (106 mi)
- Basin size: 2,760 km^{2} (1,070 sq mi)
- Discharge
  - average: 9.9 m^{3}/s (350 cu ft/s)

Basin features
- Progression: Warta→ Oder→ Baltic Sea

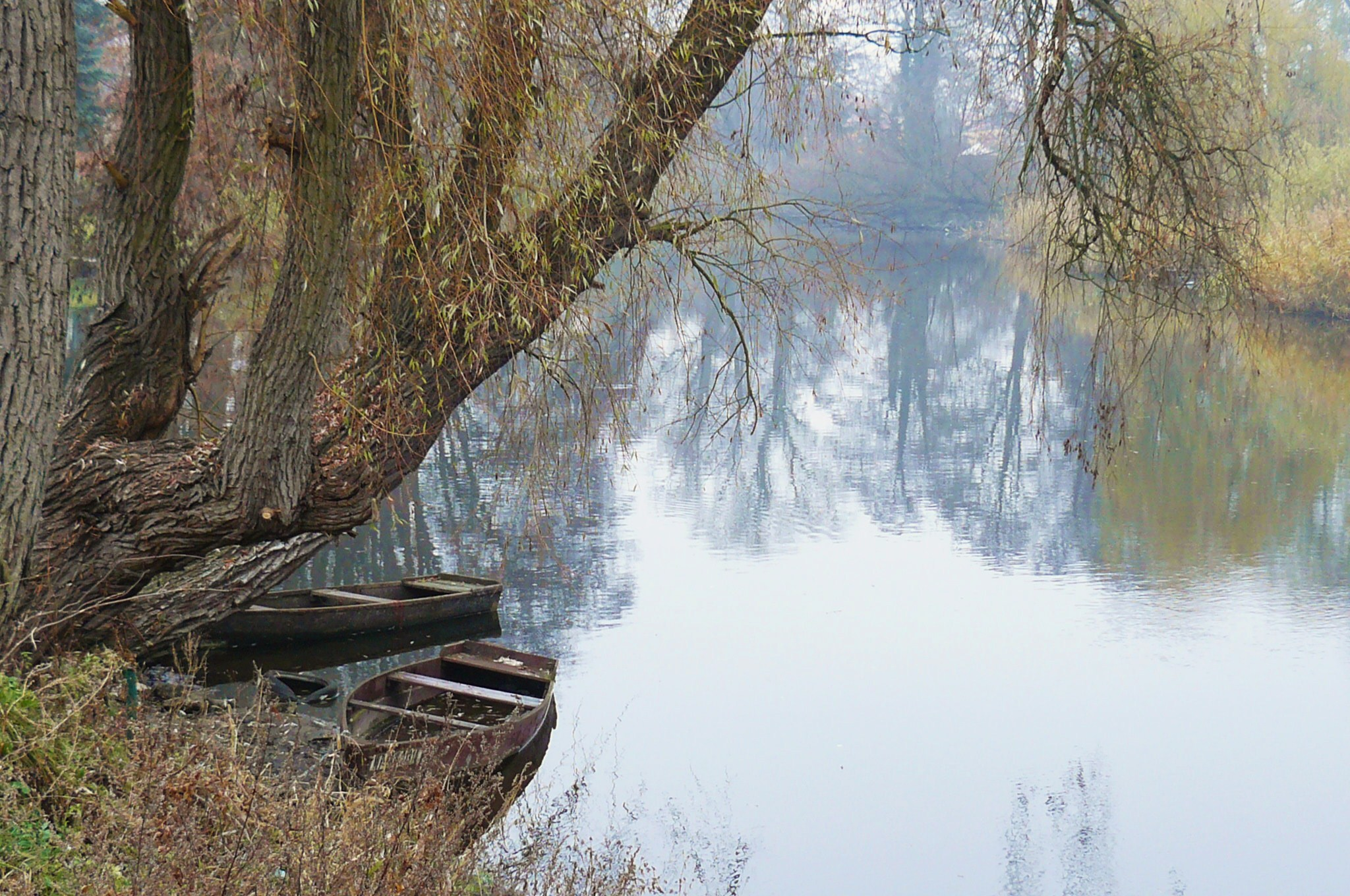
The Obra River near Zbąszyń.

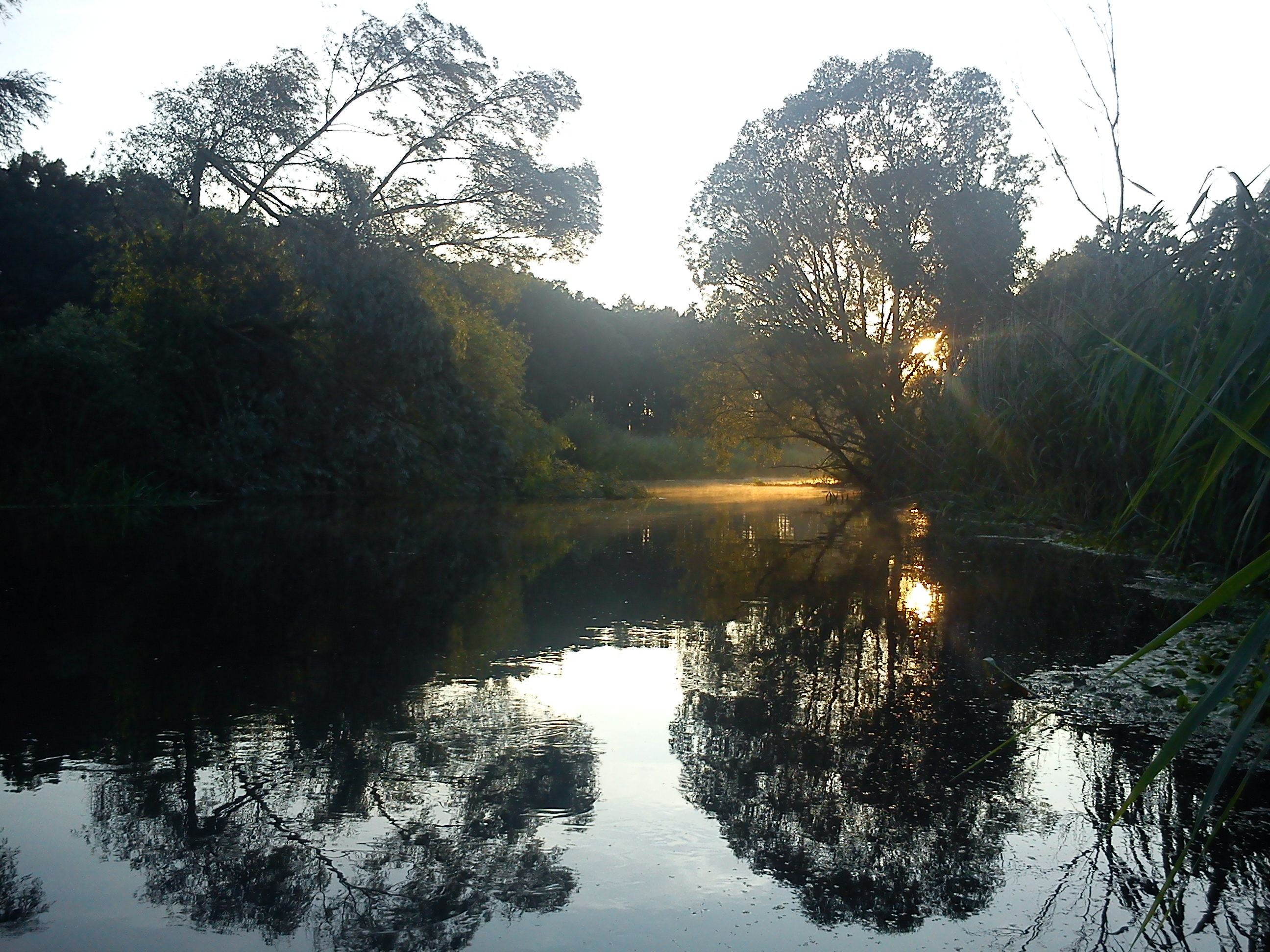
The Obra near Trzciel.

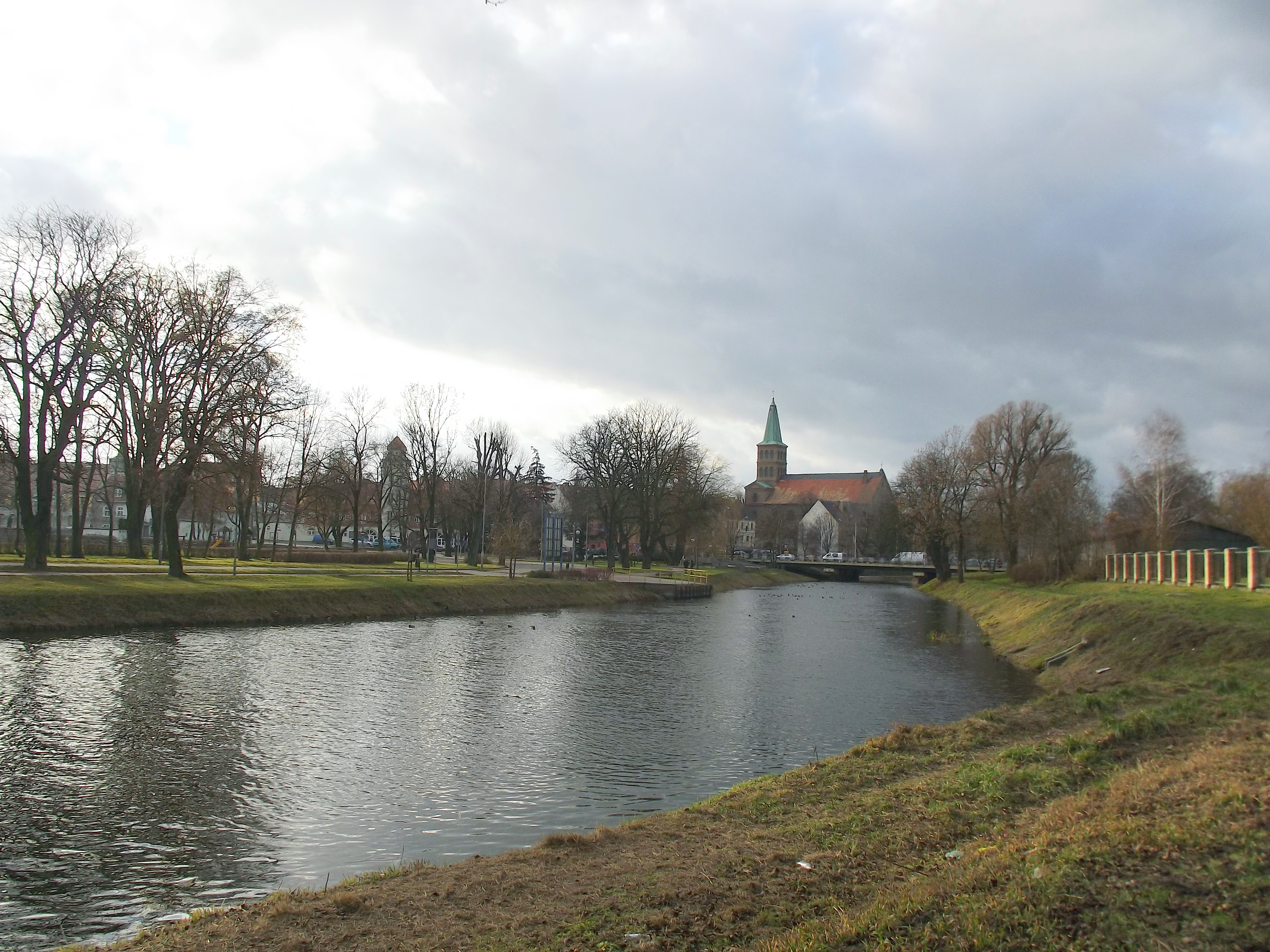
The Obra River in Międzyrzecz.

The Obra is a river in west Poland, a left tributary of the Warta river (in Skwierzyna), with a length of 171 kilometres and a basin area of 2,760 km^{2}. The river is popular with canoe and kayak enthusiasts and an established canoe trail exists.

== Course ==
The river source is near Jarocin, the mouth into the Warta River in the town of Skwierzyna. The Obra flows through several other towns like Krzywin, Kościan, Zbaszyn, Trzciel, Miedzyrzecz, Bledzew and Skwierzyna. The river also flows through several lakes.

== Canoeing ==
The Obra is a popular river for canoeing and kayaking. The canoe trips usually begin from Zbaszyn. From there, the river passes through wilderness areas and well as the countryside. The canoe trip is not particularly difficult, with the exception of a few tricky places where fallen trees might pose a disruption. The Obra is widely regarded as a safe river for beginners.

== Flora and fauna ==
The Obra River is a rich habitat for flora and fauna. Several species of orchids grow here. Sundews, mud sedge, club-mosses, Daphne, and Turk's cap lily, together with more than 200 species of mosses and an equally large number of fungi grow in the area around Obra. Stretches of oak, beech and Scots pine grow along the river.

The Obra is also an important habitat for birds. There are over 150 species inhabiting the area. Some of the important birds found here are the sea eagle, osprey, golden eagle, common merganser, eagle owl, black stork, black woodpecker, and corn crake. Swamp turtles also live in Obra's waters. Over 40 species of mammals roam the area around the Obra, including beaver, river otter, deer, badgers, hares, and wild boar. Fish species found in Obra include catfish, river trout, grayling, lake trout, powan, barbel, and salmon.

== The monster ==
There is a local lore connected with the Obra river. The lore is centered near the northern part of the river, close to Bledzewand. There is a story of the existence of a giant fish in Lake Czapliniec. The fish is widely believed to be an old fish that has grown to a gigantic size. Others refer to it as a monster. Tales of the fish eating ducks, swans and even small dogs abound.

== Towns ==
- Krzywiń
- Kościan
- Zbąszyń
- Trzciel
- Międzyrzecz
- Bledzew
- Skwierzyna

== See also ==
- Rivers of Poland
