= Kleszczewo, Lubusz Voivodeship =

Kleszczewo
- Village
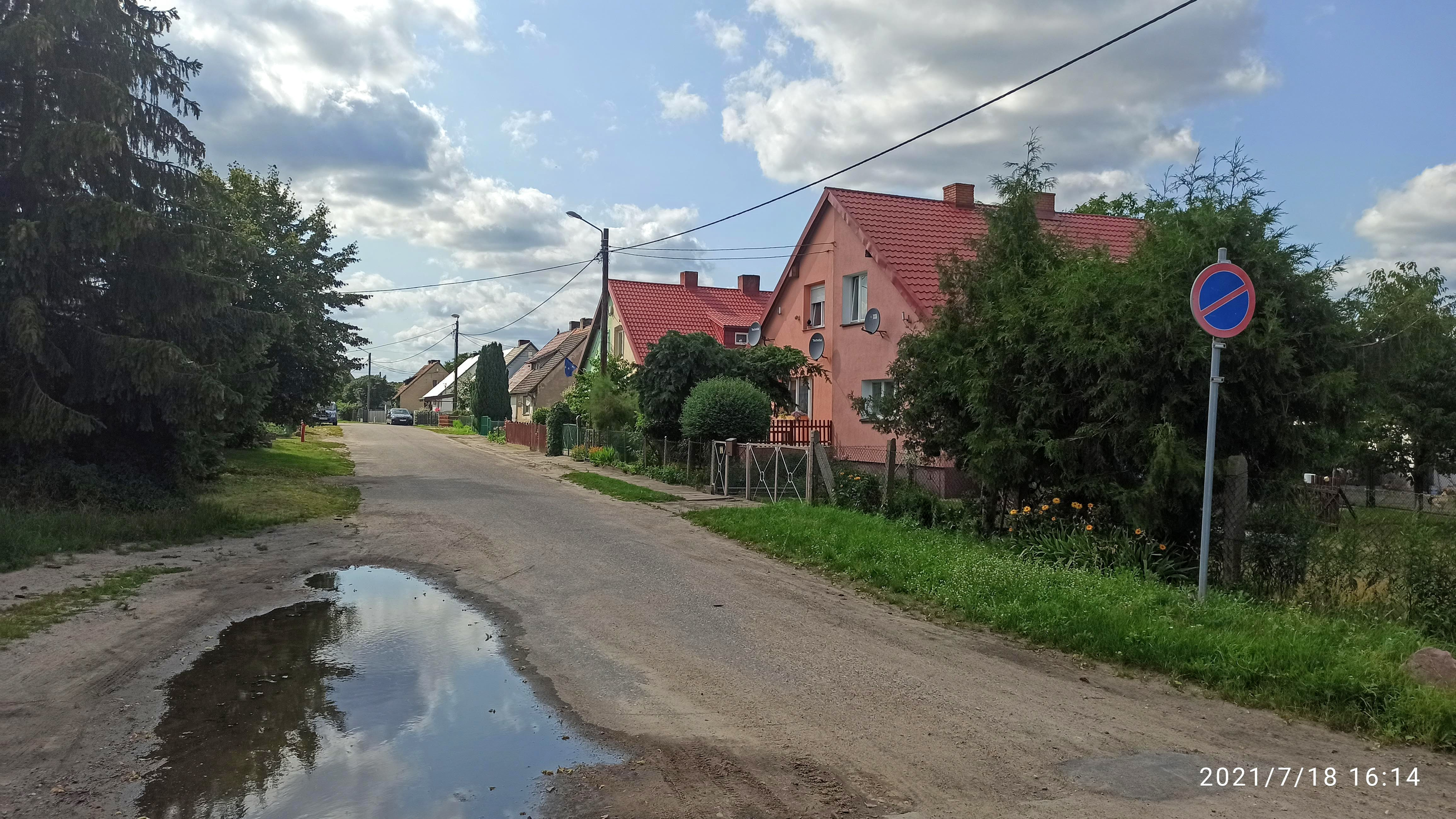

- Location within Poland
- Coordinates: 52°27′29″N 15°23′25″E
- Country: Poland
- Voivodeship: Lubusz
- County: Międzyrzecz
- Gmina: Bledzew
- Population: 390

Kleszczewo [klɛʂˈt͡ʂɛvɔ] is a village in the administrative district of Gmina Bledzew, within Międzyrzecz County, Lubusz Voivodeship, in western Poland.
