= Klatka, Greater Poland Voivodeship =

Klatka
- Village
- Location within Poland
- Coordinates: 51°49′31″N 17°28′31″E
- Country: Poland
- Voivodeship: Greater Poland
- County: Krotoszyn
- Gmina: Koźmin Wielkopolski

Klatka [ˈklatka] is a village in the administrative district of Gmina Koźmin Wielkopolski, within Krotoszyn County, Greater Poland Voivodeship, in west-central Poland.
