= Sapieżyn =

- Village
- Location within Poland
- Coordinates: 51°52′N 17°31′E
- Country: Poland
- Voivodeship: Greater Poland
- County: Krotoszyn
- Gmina: Koźmin Wielkopolski

Sapieżyn [saˈpjɛʐɨn] is a village in the administrative district of Gmina Koźmin Wielkopolski, within Krotoszyn County, Greater Poland Voivodeship, in west-central Poland.
