= Pniewo, Gmina Bledzew =

Pniewo
- Village
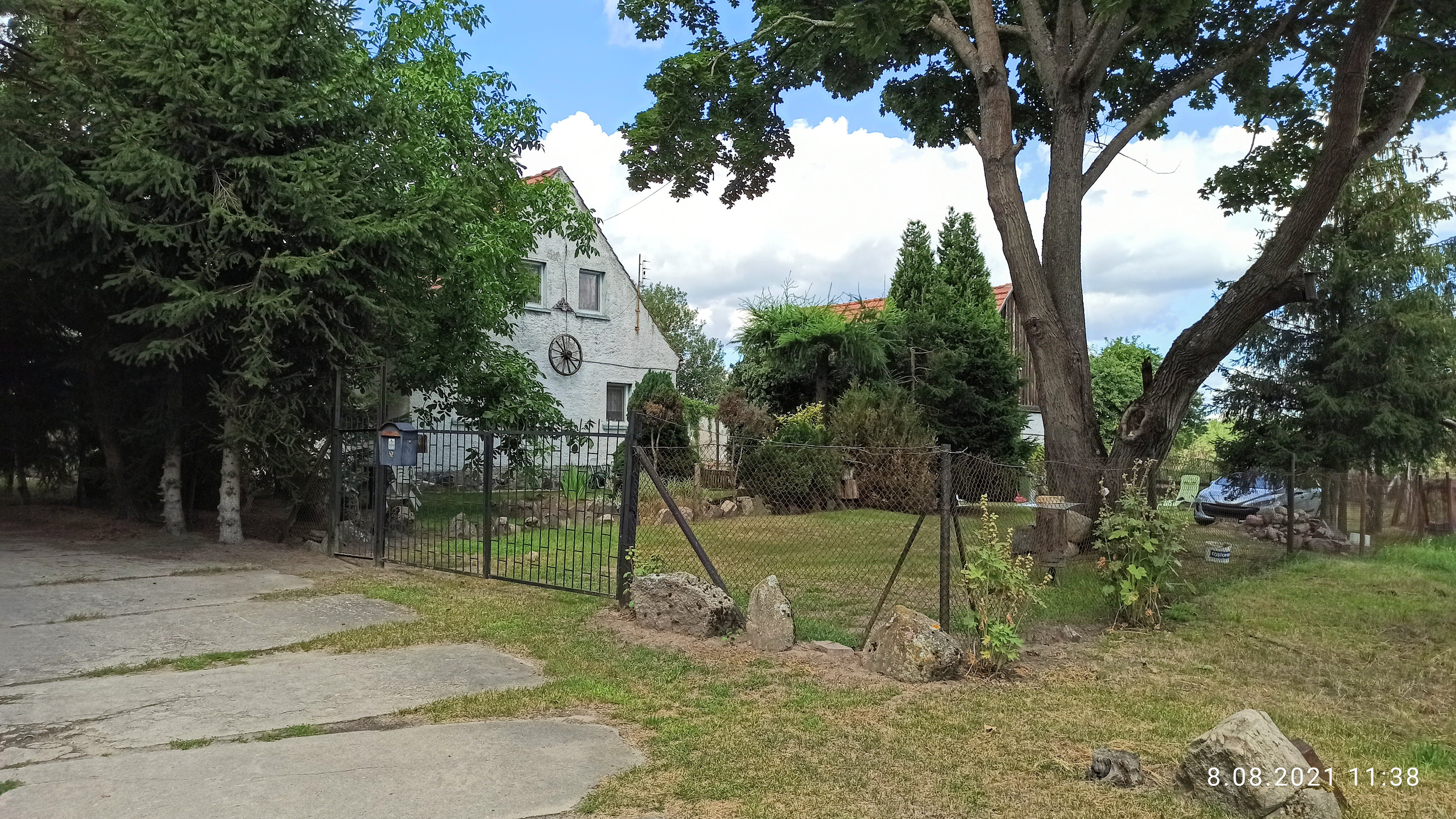

- Location within Poland
- Coordinates: 52°32′N 15°15′E
- Country: Poland
- Voivodeship: Lubusz
- County: Międzyrzecz
- Gmina: Bledzew
- Population: 30

Pniewo [ˈpɲɛvɔ] is a village in the administrative district of Gmina Bledzew, within Międzyrzecz County, Lubusz Voivodeship, in western Poland.
