= Borzęciczki =

- Village
- Location within Poland
- Coordinates: 51°51′N 17°21′E
- Country: Poland
- Voivodeship: Greater Poland
- County: Krotoszyn
- Gmina: Koźmin Wielkopolski

Borzęciczki [bɔʐɛnˈt͡ɕit͡ʂki] is a village in the administrative district of Gmina Koźmin Wielkopolski, within Krotoszyn County, Greater Poland Voivodeship, in west-central Poland.

Borzęciczki is the location of a boarding school for children with special needs established in 1960 at the late-19th-century palace. It is called Specjalny Ośrodek Szkolno – Wychowawczy im Janusza Korczaka w Borzęciczkach, and managed by the Ministry of National Education. The school was named after Janusz Korczak, and in 2002 decorated with his monumental sculpture, moved from the Okopowa Street Jewish Cemetery cenotaph after being replaced with a bronze cast.
