= Elektrownia =

- Settlement
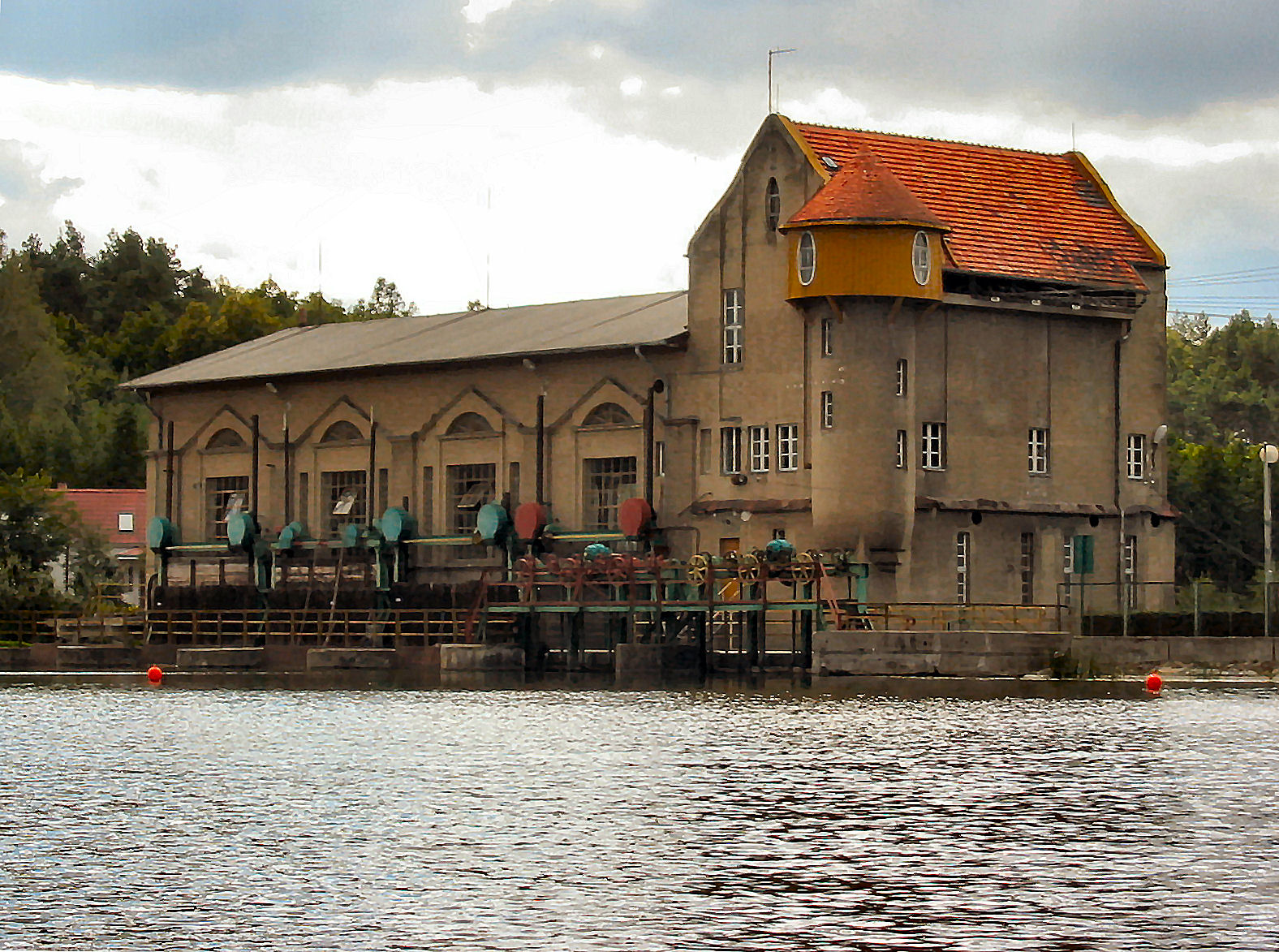

- Location within Poland
- Coordinates: 52°30′N 15°26′E
- Country: Poland
- Voivodeship: Lubusz
- County: Międzyrzecz
- Gmina: Bledzew
- Population: 5

Elektrownia [ɛlɛkˈtrɔvɲa] is a settlement in the administrative district of Gmina Bledzew, within Międzyrzecz County, Lubusz Voivodeship, in western Poland.
