= Sokola Dąbrowa =

Sokola Dąbrowa, Poland
- Village
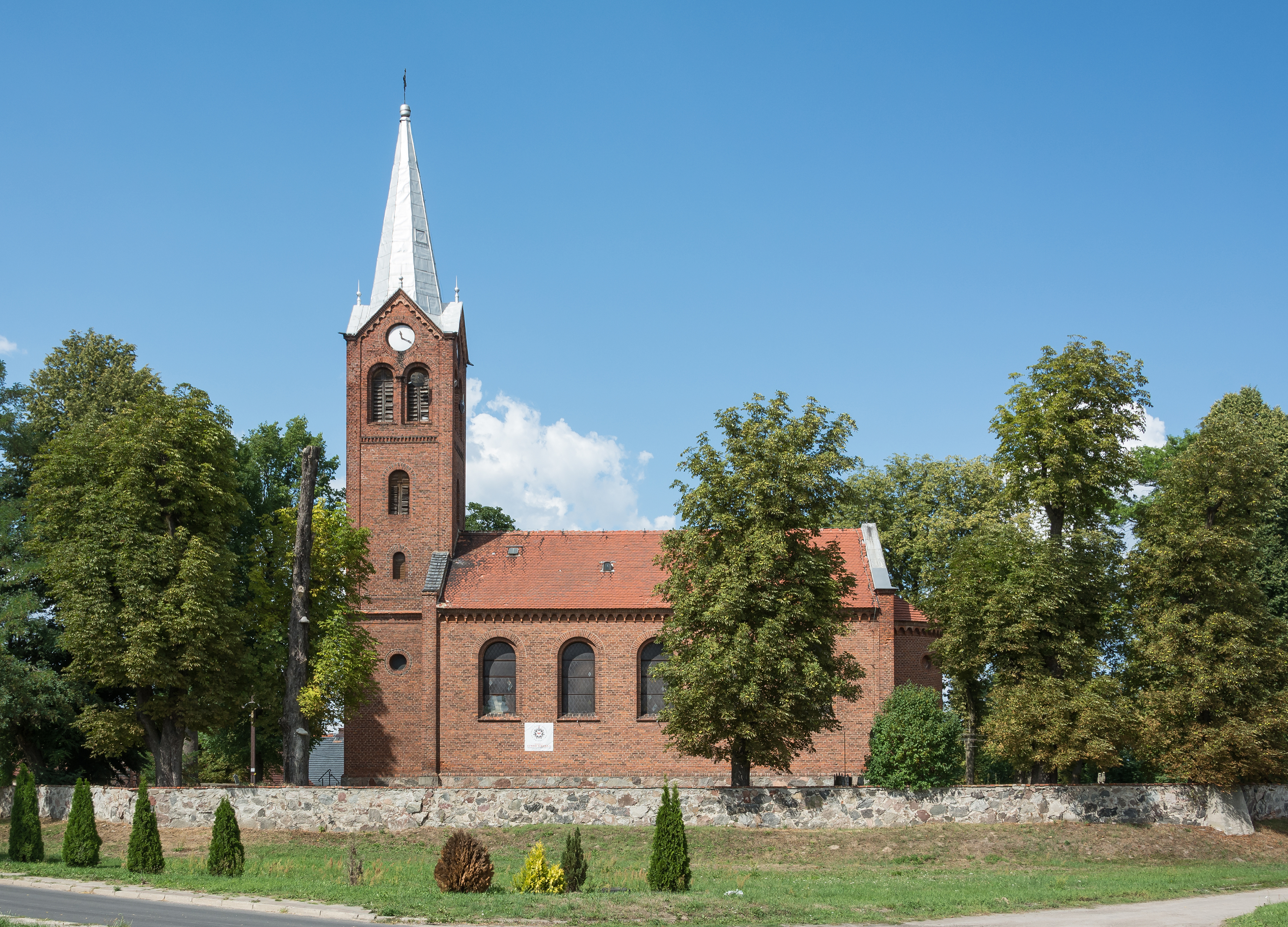
- Parish church

- Location within Poland
- Coordinates: 52°30′N 15°21′E
- Country: Poland
- Voivodeship: Lubusz
- County: Międzyrzecz
- Gmina: Bledzew

Sokola Dąbrowa [sɔˈkɔla dɔmˈbrɔva] is a village in the administrative district of Gmina Bledzew, within Międzyrzecz County, Lubusz Voivodeship, in western Poland.

For centuries, Sokola Dąbrowa was part of the Greater Polish Poznań Voivodeship, close to the border with the Neumark region of Brandenburg. In the course of the Second Partition of Poland in 1793 it was annexed by the Kingdom of Prussia. Incorporated into the Grand Duchy of Posen from 1815, it returned to the Republic of Poland with the implementation of the Oder-Neisse line after World War II while the remaining German population was expelled.
