= Orla, Krotoszyn County =

Orla
- Village
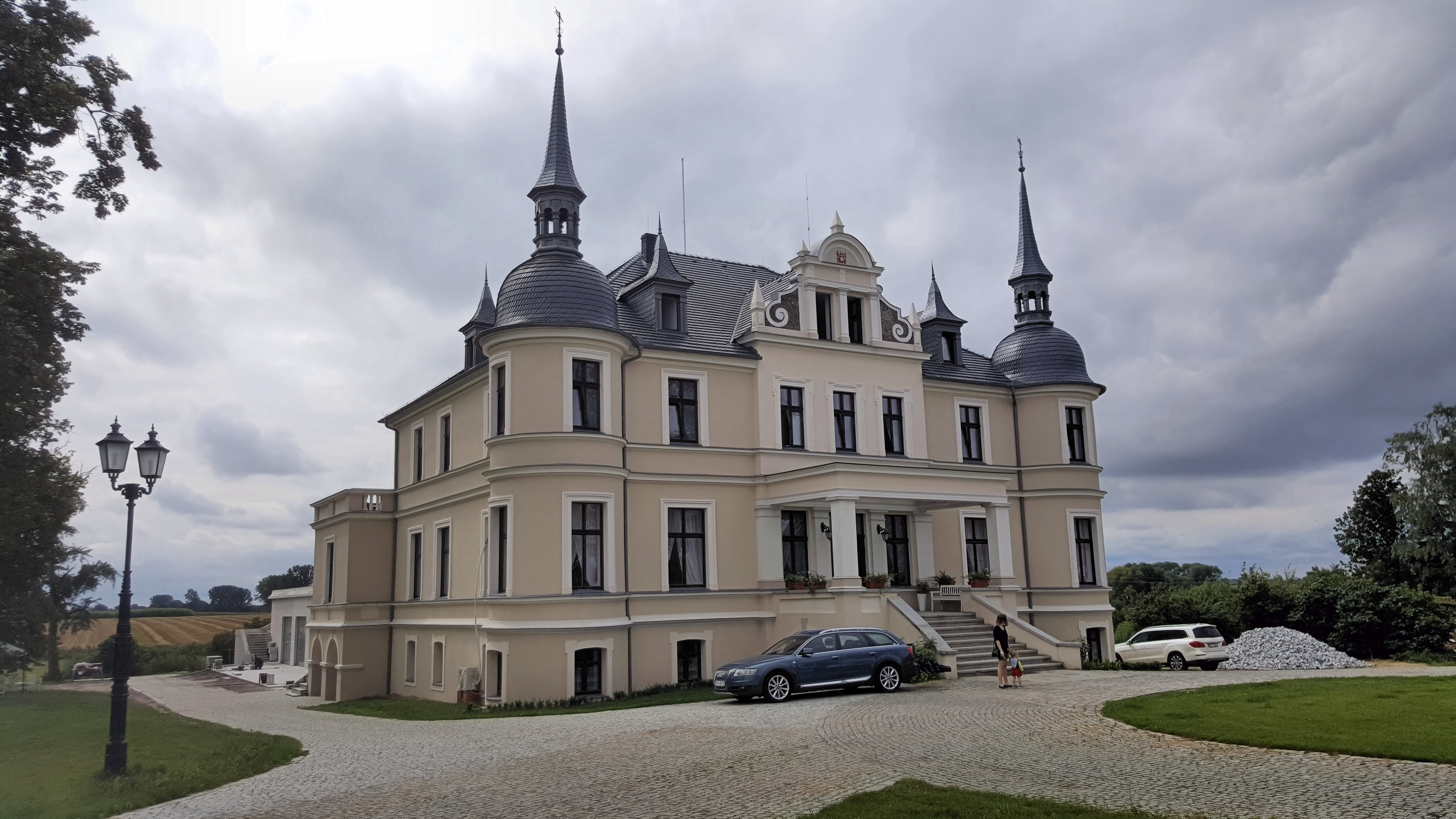
- A renovated palace in Orla, Krotoszyn County

- Location within Poland
- Coordinates: 51°49′45″N 17°30′04″E
- Country: Poland
- Voivodeship: Greater Poland
- County: Krotoszyn
- Gmina: Koźmin Wielkopolski
- Population: 390

Orla [ˈɔrla] is a village in the administrative district of Gmina Koźmin Wielkopolski, within Krotoszyn County, Greater Poland Voivodeship, in west-central Poland.
