= Szymanów, Greater Poland Voivodeship =

Szymanów
- Village
- Location within Poland
- Coordinates: 51°52′33″N 17°24′53″E
- Country: Poland
- Voivodeship: Greater Poland
- County: Krotoszyn
- Gmina: Koźmin Wielkopolski

Szymanów (Polish: [ʂɨˈmanuf]) is a village in the administrative district of Gmina Koźmin Wielkopolski, within Krotoszyn County, Greater Poland Voivodeship, in west-central Poland.
