= Templewko =

- Village
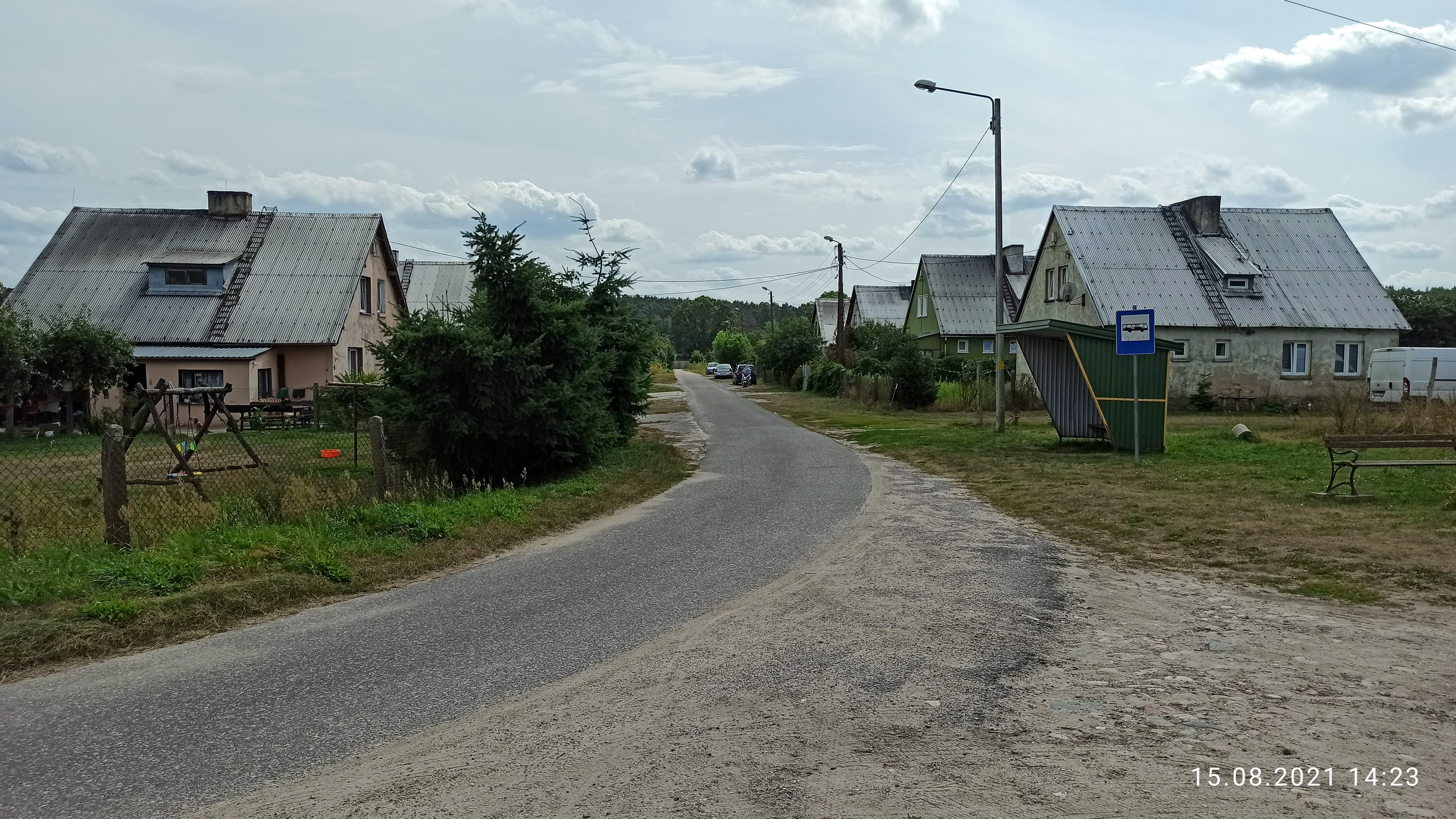

- Location within Poland
- Coordinates: 52°25′35″N 15°21′9″E
- Country: Poland
- Voivodeship: Lubusz
- County: Międzyrzecz
- Gmina: Bledzew
- Population: 59

Templewko [tɛmˈplɛfkɔ] is a village in the administrative district of Gmina Bledzew, within Międzyrzecz County, Lubusz Voivodeship, in western Poland.
