= Popowo, Międzyrzecz County =

Popowo
- Village
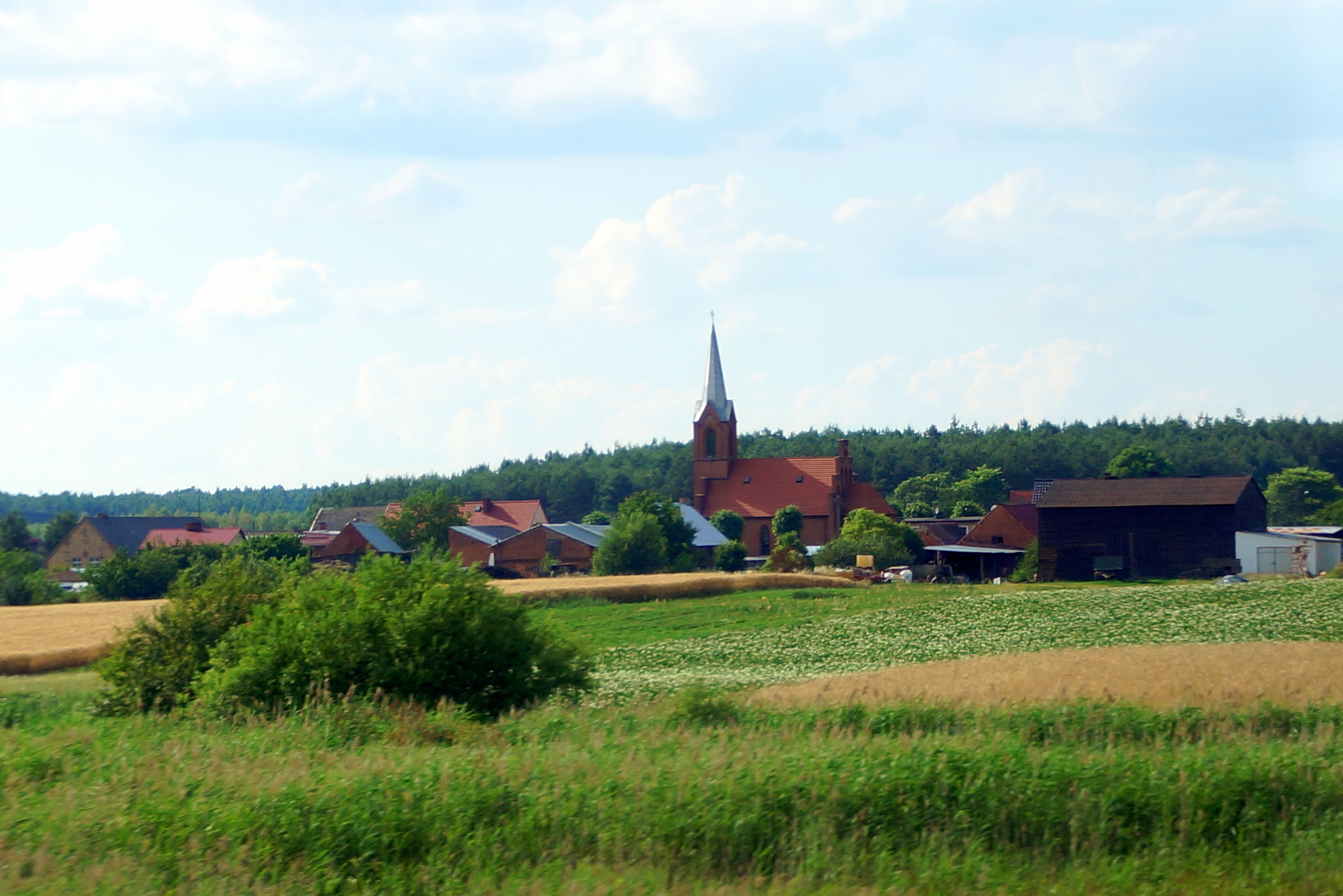
- View of Popowo

- Location within Poland
- Coordinates: 52°31′N 15°30′E
- Country: Poland
- Voivodeship: Lubusz
- County: Międzyrzecz
- Gmina: Bledzew

Population
  - Total: 333
- Time zone: UTC+1 (CET)
  - Summer (DST): UTC+2 (CEST)
- Vehicle registration: FMI

Popowo ([pɔˈpɔvɔ]; German: Poppe) is a village in the administrative district of Gmina Bledzew, within Międzyrzecz County, Lubusz Voivodeship, in western Poland.

Popowo was a private church village, administratively located in the Poznań County in the Poznań Voivodeship in the Greater Poland Province of the Kingdom of Poland.
