= Mycielin, Krotoszyn County =

Mycielin
- Village
- Location within Poland
- Coordinates: 51°50′58″N 17°19′51″E
- Country: Poland
- Voivodeship: Greater Poland
- County: Krotoszyn
- Gmina: Koźmin Wielkopolski

Mycielin [mɨˈt͡ɕɛlin] is a village in the administrative district of Gmina Koźmin Wielkopolski, within Krotoszyn County, Greater Poland Voivodeship, in west-central Poland.
