= Dębówiec, Krotoszyn County =

Dębówiec
- Village
- Location within Poland
- Coordinates: 51°51′32″N 17°22′27″E
- Country: Poland
- Voivodeship: Greater Poland
- County: Krotoszyn
- Gmina: Koźmin Wielkopolski

Dębówiec [dɛmˈbuvjɛt͡s] is a village in the administrative district of Gmina Koźmin Wielkopolski, within Krotoszyn County, Greater Poland Voivodeship, in west-central Poland.
