= Gmina Koźmin Wielkopolski =

Gmina Koźmin Wielkopolski Koźmin Wielkopolski Commune
- Gmina
- Flag Coat of arms

- Coordinates (Koźmin Wielkopolski): 51°49′26″N 17°27′19″E
- Country: Poland
- Voivodeship: Greater Poland
- County: Krotoszyn
- Seat: Koźmin Wielkopolski

Area
  - Total: 152.69 km^{2} (58.95 sq mi)

Population (2006)
  - Total: 13,820
  - Density: 90.51/km^{2} (234.4/sq mi)
  - Urban: 6,707
  - Rural: 7,113
- Website: http://www.kozminwlkp.pl/

Gmina Koźmin Wielkopolski is an urban-rural gmina (administrative district) in Krotoszyn County, Greater Poland Voivodeship, in west-central Poland. Its seat is the town of Koźmin Wielkopolski, which lies approximately 16 kilometres (10 mi) north of Krotoszyn and 74 km (46 mi) south-east of the regional capital Poznań.

The gmina covers an area of 152.69 square kilometres (59.0 sq mi), and as of 2006 its total population is 13,820 (out of which the population of Koźmin Wielkopolski amounts to 6,707, and the population of the rural part of the gmina is 7,113).

== Villages ==
Gmina Koźmin Wielkopolski contains the settlements of Koźmin Wielkopolski, Biały Dwór, Borzęcice, Borzęciczki, Cegielnia, Czarny Sad, Dębiogóra, Dębówiec, Dymacz, Gałązki, Góreczki, Gościejew, Józefów, Kaniew, Klatka, Lipowiec, Mogiłka, Mokronos, Mycielin, Nowa Obra, Orla, Orlinka, Paniwola, Pogorzałki Małe, Pogorzałki Wielkie, Psie Pole, Sapieżyn, Serafinów, Skałów, Staniew, Stara Obra, Suśnia, Szymanów, Tatary, Walerianów, Wałków, Wrotków and Wyrębin.

== Neighbouring gminas ==
Gmina Koźmin Wielkopolski is bordered by the gminas of Borek Wielkopolski, Dobrzyca, Jaraczewo, Jarocin, Kobylin, Krotoszyn, Pogorzela and Rozdrażew.
