= Nowa Wieś, Międzyrzecz County =

Nowa Wieś
- Village
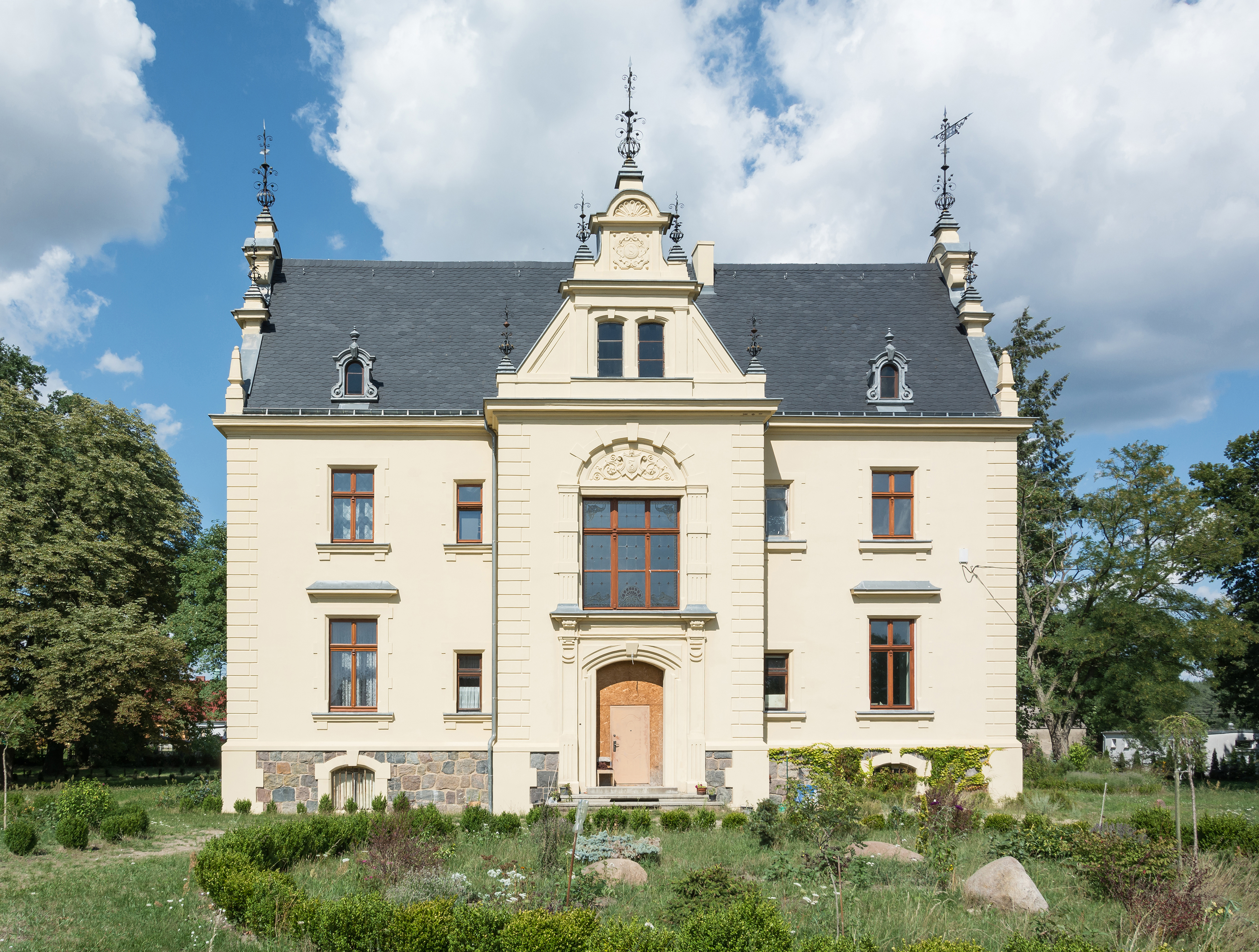
- Nowa Wieś Palace

- Location within Poland
- Coordinates: 52°28′20″N 15°21′31″E
- Country: Poland
- Voivodeship: Lubusz
- County: Międzyrzecz
- Gmina: Bledzew

Population
  - Total: 621
- Time zone: UTC+1 (CET)
  - Summer (DST): UTC+2 (CEST)
- Vehicle registration: FMI

Nowa Wieś [ˈnɔva ˈvjɛɕ] is a village in the administrative district of Gmina Bledzew, within Międzyrzecz County, Lubusz Voivodeship, in western Poland.

Nowa Wieś was a private church village, administratively located in the Poznań County in the Poznań Voivodeship in the Greater Poland Province of the Kingdom of Poland.
