= Dębiogóra =

- Village
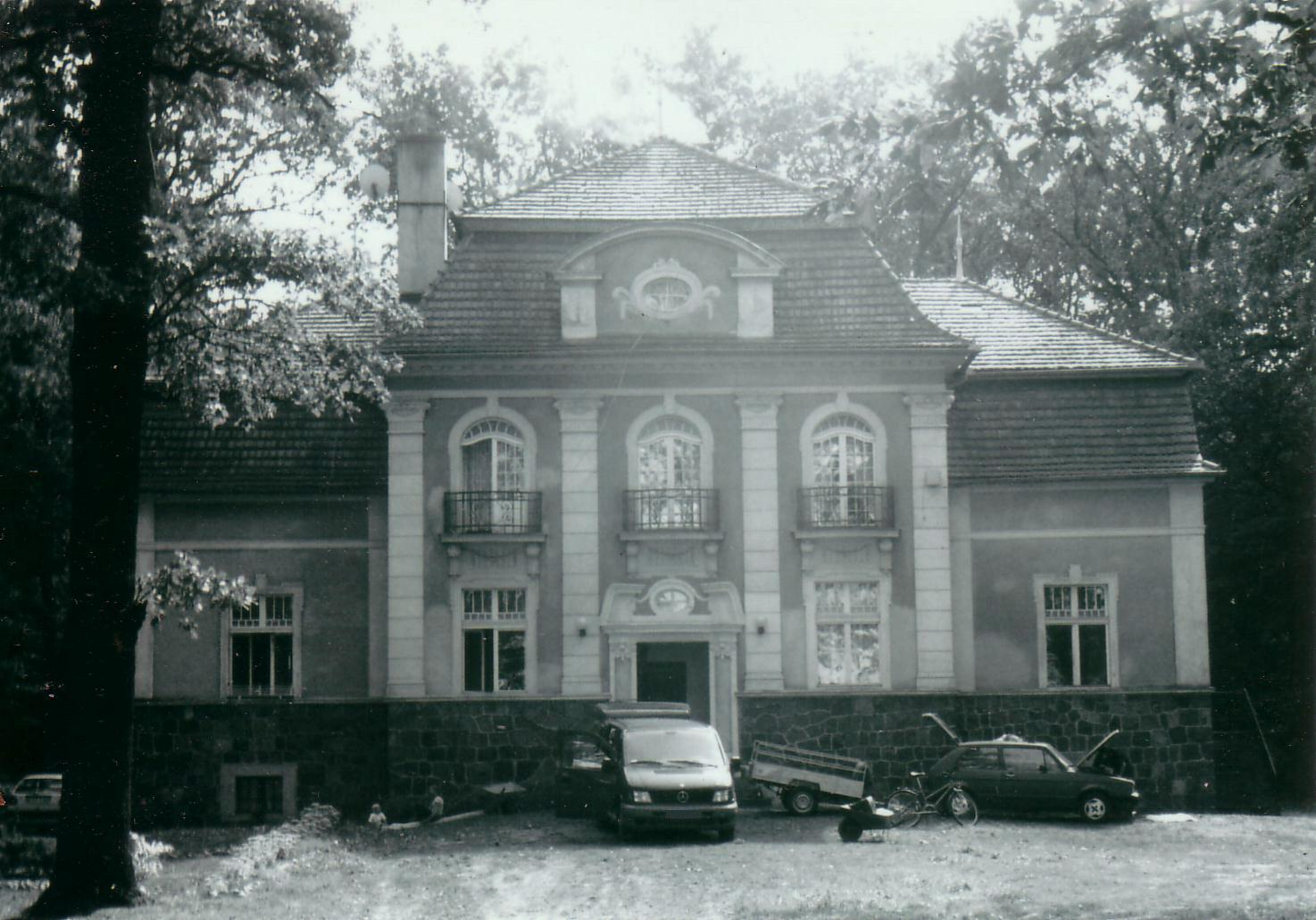
- Dębiogóra manor house

- Location within Poland
- Coordinates: 51°47′39″N 17°25′57″E
- Country: Poland
- Voivodeship: Greater Poland
- County: Krotoszyn
- Gmina: Koźmin Wielkopolski

Dębiogóra [dɛmbjɔˈɡura] is a village in the administrative district of Gmina Koźmin Wielkopolski, within Krotoszyn County, Greater Poland Voivodeship, in west-central Poland.
