= Nowa Obra, Krotoszyn County =

Nowa Obra
- Village
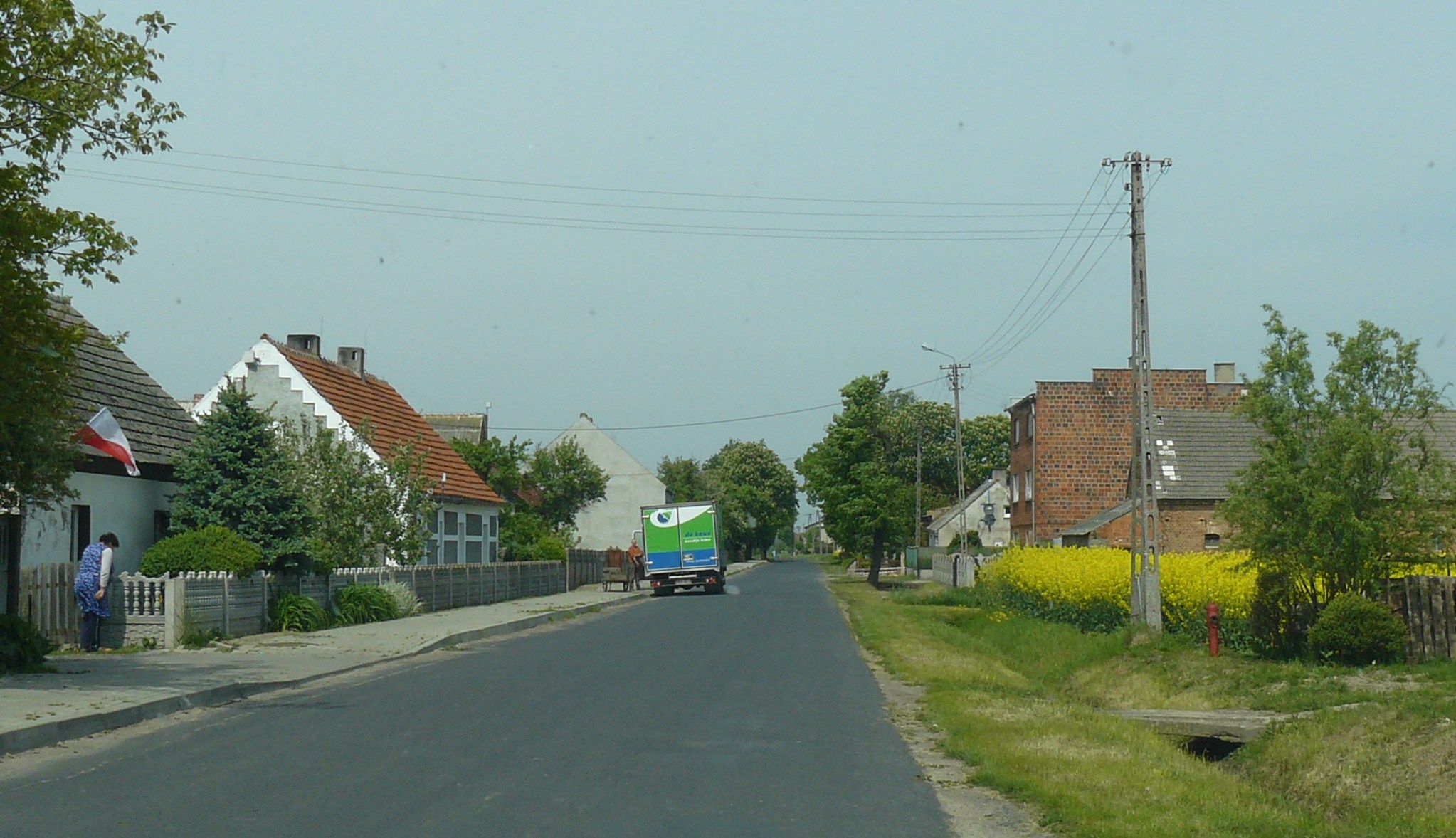
- Road in Nowa Obra

- Location within Poland
- Coordinates: 51°51′23″N 17°27′17″E
- Country: Poland
- Voivodeship: Greater Poland
- County: Krotoszyn
- Gmina: Koźmin Wielkopolski

Nowa Obra [ˈnɔva ˈɔbra] is a village in the administrative district of Gmina Koźmin Wielkopolski, within Krotoszyn County, Greater Poland Voivodeship, in west-central Poland.
