= Pogorzałki Małe =

- Village
- Location within Poland
- Coordinates: 51°51′4″N 17°18′30″E
- Country: Poland
- Voivodeship: Greater Poland
- County: Krotoszyn
- Gmina: Koźmin Wielkopolski
- Population: 160

Pogorzałki Małe [pɔɡɔˈʐau̯ki ˈmawɛ] is a village in the administrative district of Gmina Koźmin Wielkopolski, within Krotoszyn County, Greater Poland Voivodeship, in west-central Poland.
