= Gościejew =

- Village
- Location within Poland
- Coordinates: 51°47′N 17°21′E
- Country: Poland
- Voivodeship: Greater Poland
- County: Krotoszyn
- Gmina: Koźmin Wielkopolski

Gościejew (Polish: [ɡɔɕˈt͡ɕɛjɛf]) is a village in the administrative district of Gmina Koźmin Wielkopolski, within Krotoszyn County, Greater Poland Voivodeship, in west-central Poland.
