= Biały Dwór, Greater Poland Voivodeship =

Biały Dwór
- Village
- Location within Poland
- Coordinates: 51°51′N 17°25′E
- Country: Poland
- Voivodeship: Greater Poland
- County: Krotoszyn
- Gmina: Koźmin Wielkopolski

Biały Dwór [ˈbjawɨ ˈdvur] is a village in the administrative district of Gmina Koźmin Wielkopolski, within Krotoszyn County, Greater Poland Voivodeship, in west-central Poland.
