= Tatary, Greater Poland Voivodeship =

Tatary
- Village
- Location within Poland
- Coordinates: 51°48′58″N 17°28′38″E
- Country: Poland
- Voivodeship: Greater Poland
- County: Krotoszyn
- Gmina: Koźmin Wielkopolski

Tatary [taˈtarɨ] is a village in the administrative district of Gmina Koźmin Wielkopolski, within Krotoszyn County, Greater Poland Voivodeship, in west-central Poland.
