= Kalsko =

- Village
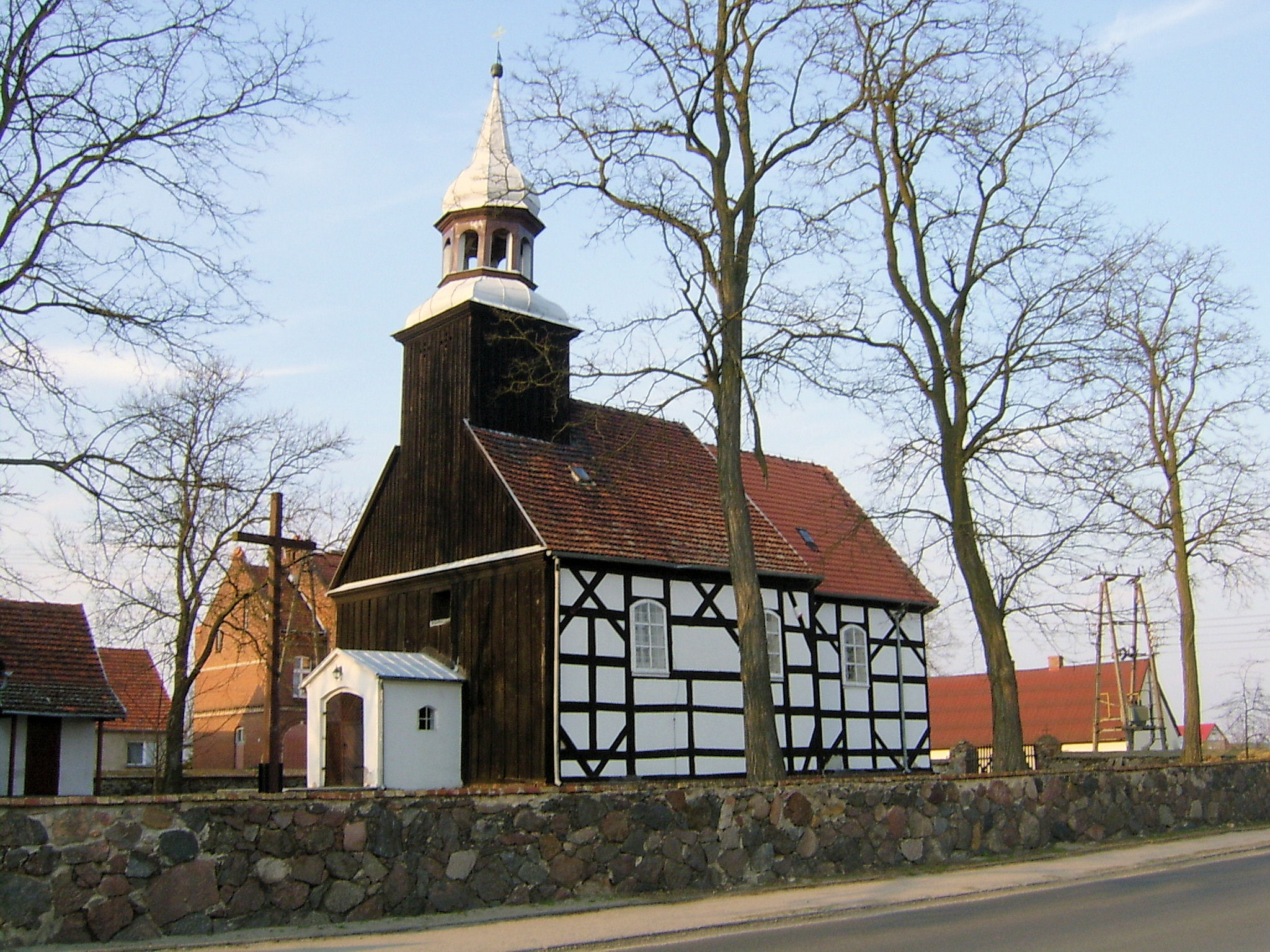
- Saint Bartholomew Church in Kalsko

- Location within Poland
- Coordinates: 52°30′33″N 15°37′19″E
- Country: Poland
- Voivodeship: Lubusz
- County: Międzyrzecz
- Gmina: Międzyrzecz

Population
  - Total: 400
- Time zone: UTC+1 (CET)
  - Summer (DST): UTC+2 (CEST)
- Vehicle registration: FMI
- Website: http://www.kalsko.pl

Kalsko [ˈkalskɔ] is a village in the administrative district of Gmina Międzyrzecz, within Międzyrzecz County, Lubusz Voivodeship, in western Poland.

Kalsko was a private church village, administratively located in the Poznań County in the Poznań Voivodeship in the Greater Poland Province of the Kingdom of Poland.
