= Katarzynki, Lubusz Voivodeship =

Katarzynki
- Settlement
- Location within Poland
- Coordinates: 52°32′30″N 15°27′33″E
- Country: Poland
- Voivodeship: Lubusz
- County: Międzyrzecz
- Gmina: Bledzew
- Population: 7

Katarzynki [kataˈʐɨnki] is a settlement in the administrative district of Gmina Bledzew, within Międzyrzecz County, Lubusz Voivodeship, in western Poland.
