= Bledzew =

- Village
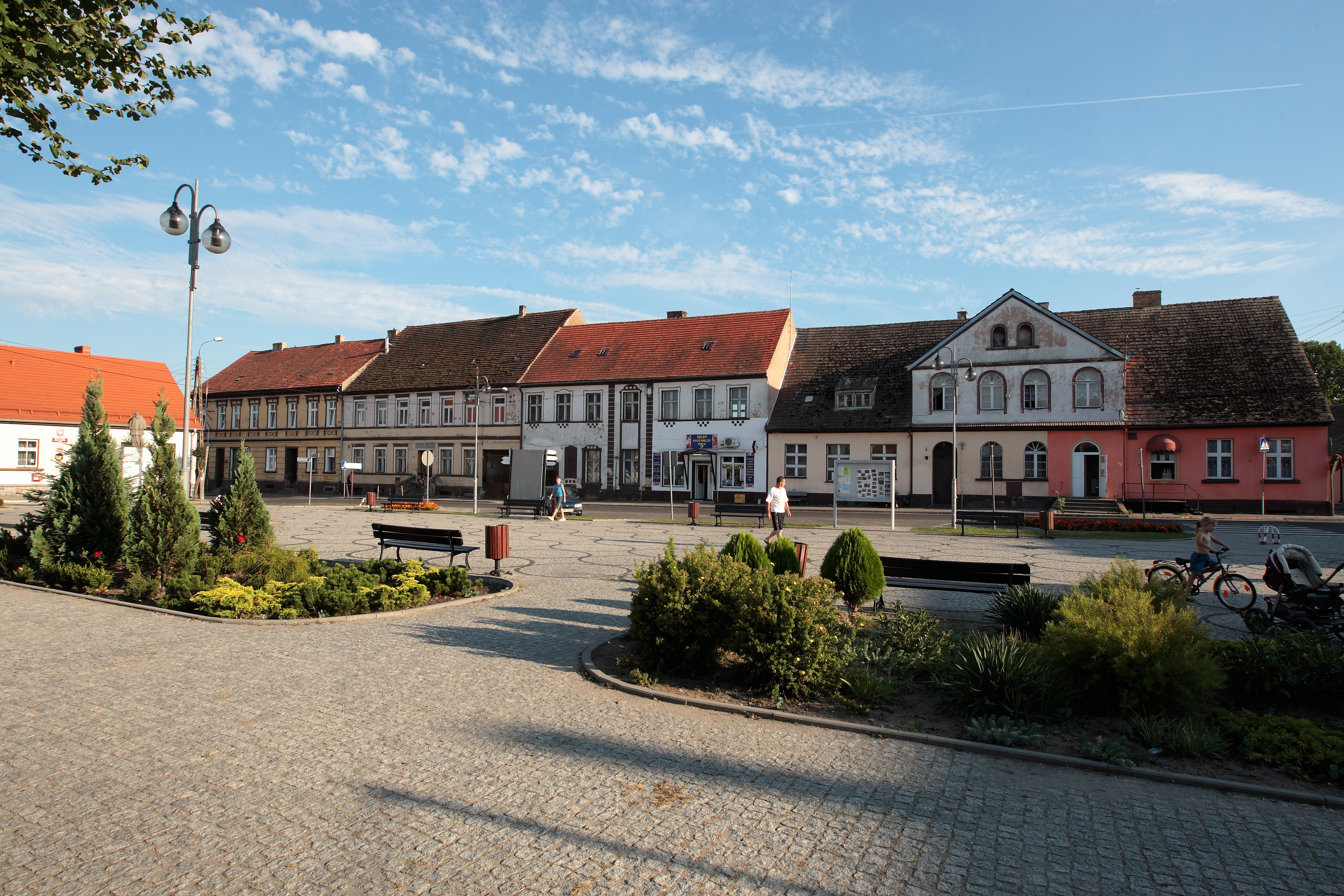
- Main square

- Location within Poland
- Coordinates: 52°31′N 15°24′E
- Country: Poland
- Voivodeship: Lubusz
- County: Międzyrzecz
- Gmina: Bledzew

Population
  - Total: 1,300
- Vehicle registration: FMI

Bledzew [ˈblɛd͡zɛf] is a village and former town in Międzyrzecz County, Lubusz Voivodeship, in western Poland. It is the seat of the gmina (administrative district) called Gmina Bledzew.

== Geography ==
The settlement lies on the western rim of the Greater Poland historic region on the left bank of the Obra river, a tributary of the Warta, and is surrounded by numerous lakes and extended forests.

== History ==
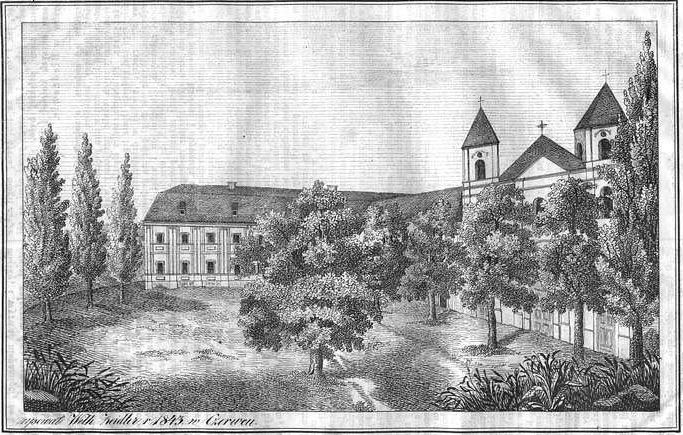
Cistercian abbey

As part of the region of Greater Poland, i.e. the cradle of the Polish state, the area formed part of Poland since its establishment in the 10th century. The settlement was established in the 1230s by the Piast duke Władysław Odonic, then ruling over the Polish duchy of Greater Poland. In the early 14th century, the Ascanian margrave Waldemar of Brandenburg occupied the Bledzew area and granted it to the Cistercian monks at Zemsko; it nevertheless was reconquered by the Polish king Władysław I the Elbow-high in 1326 and incorporated into the Poznań Voivodeship of the Kingdom of Poland.

After the Cistercian monks moved their seat to Bledzew in 1407, the citizens were vested with town privileges according to Magdeburg law by King Casimir IV Jagiellon in 1458, confirmed by his successor John I Albert in 1493. Bledzew was private church town, administratively located in the Poznań County in the Poznań Voivodeship in the Greater Poland Province. In 1736, abbot Benedykt Gurowski expanded the monastery. In the course of the Second Partition of Poland in 1793, Bledzew was annexed by the Kingdom of Prussia. After the successful Greater Poland uprising of 1806, it was regained by Poles and included within the short-lived Duchy of Warsaw, and after the duchy's dissolution in 1815, the village was reannexed by Prussia, within which it was incorporated into the Grand Duchy of Posen. The Cistercian abbey was secularised in 1835. From 1871, it formed part of Germany. After World War II with the implementation of the Oder-Neisse line it returned to the Republic of Poland and the remaining German population was expelled in accordance with the Potsdam Agreement.
