= Zemsko, Lubusz Voivodeship =

Zemsko
- Village
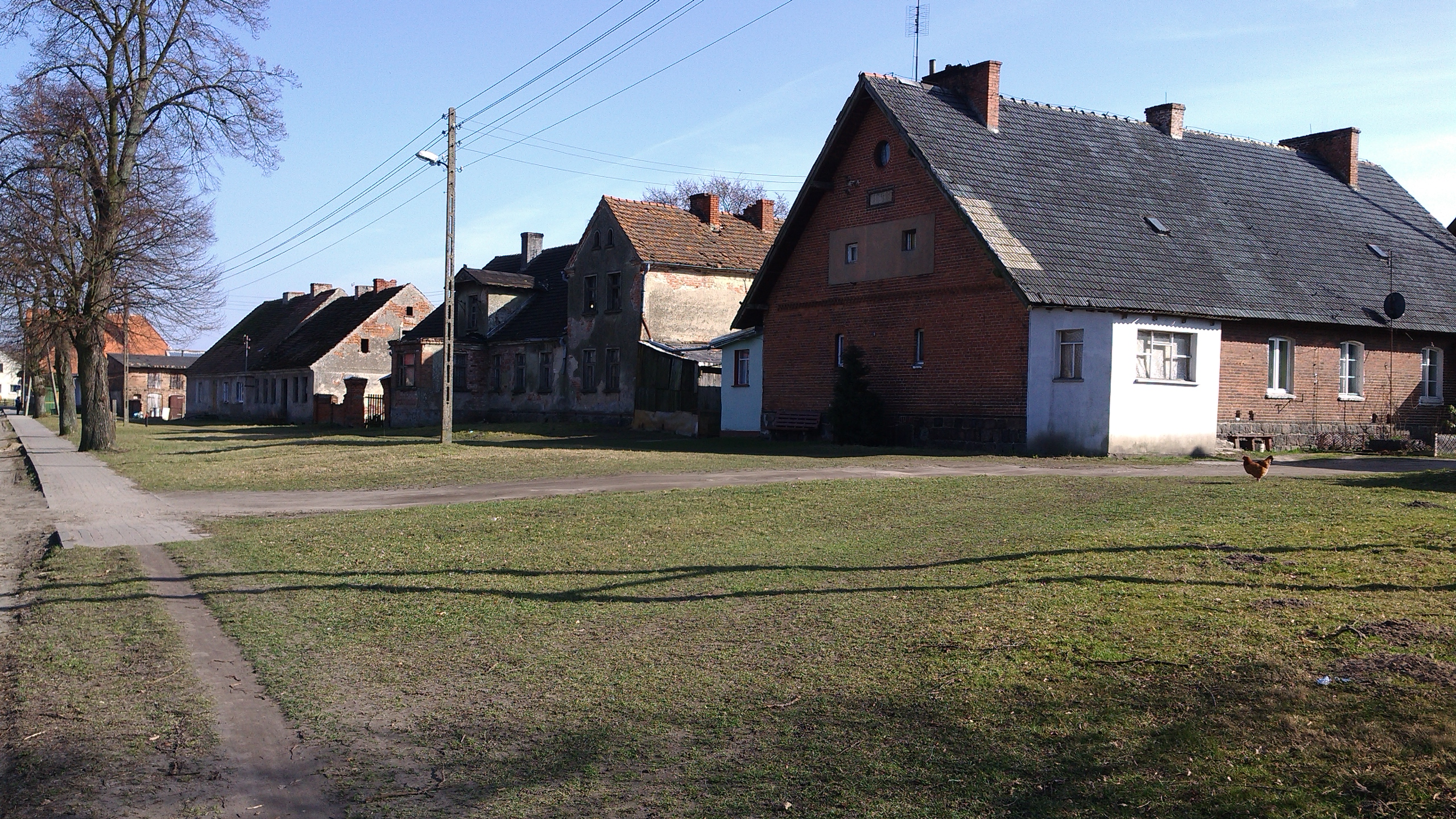
- Houses in Zemsko

- Location within Poland
- Coordinates: 52°32′7″N 15°27′32″E
- Country: Poland
- Voivodeship: Lubusz
- County: Międzyrzecz
- Gmina: Bledzew

Population
  - Total: 420
- Time zone: UTC+1 (CET)
  - Summer (DST): UTC+2 (CEST)
- Vehicle registration: FMI

Zemsko [ˈzɛmskɔ] is a village in the administrative district of Gmina Bledzew, within Międzyrzecz County, Lubusz Voivodeship, in western Poland.

== History ==
As part of the region of Greater Poland, i.e. the cradle of the Polish state, the area formed part of Poland since its establishment in the 10th century. Following the fragmentation of Poland into smaller duchies, it formed of the Duchy of Greater Poland. In 1260, Zemsko was granted to Cistercians, who then founded a monastery in Zemsko in 1285. In the following centuries, Zemsko, formerly also known as Zębsko, was a private church village, administratively located in the Poznań County in the Poznań Voivodeship in the Greater Poland Province of the Kingdom of Poland. In 1578, the Cistercians relocated to nearby Bledzew.
