= Kreis Koschmin =

Location of Kreis Koschmin

Kreis Koschmin (Polish: Powiat Koźmiński) was a district in Regierungsbezirk Posen, in the Prussian Province of Posen from 1887 to 1919. Today, the territory of this district lies in the southern part of the Greater Poland Voivodeship in Poland.

== History ==
On October 1, 1887, the Koschmin district was formed from the northern part of the Krotoschin district. The town of Koschmin was the district capital.

On December 27, 1918, the Greater Poland uprising began in the province of Posen, and by January 2, 1919, the town of Koschmin was under Polish control. On February 16, 1919, an armistice ended the Polish-German fighting. With the signing of the Treaty of Versailles on June 28, 1919, the German government officially ceded the Koschmin district to the newly founded Second Polish Republic.

== Demographics ==
According to the Prussian census of 1910, Kreis Koschmin had a population of 33,519, of which 83% were Poles and 17% were Germans.

== Military command ==
Kreis Koschmin was part of the military command (German: Bezirkskommando) in Posen at Kosten.

== Court system ==
The main court (German: Landgericht) was in Lissa, with lower courts (German: Amtsgericht) in Koschmin and Krotoschin.

== Civil registry offices ==
In 1905, these civil registry offices (German: Standesamt) served the following towns in Kreis Koschmin:

- Borek
- Koschmin
- Pogorzela
- Starygrod
- Wiesenfeld

== Police districts ==
In 1905, these police districts (German: Polizeidistrikt) served towns in Kreis Koschmin:

- Borek
- Koschmin
- Pogorzela

== Catholic churches ==
In 1905, these Catholic parish churches served towns in Kreis Koschmin:

- Baschlow
- Groß Strzelce
- Margarethendorf
- Pogorzela
- Walkow
- Borek
- Kobylin
- Mokronos
- Radenz
- Wielowieś
- Cerekwice
- Koschmin
- Pempowo
- Starygrod
- Wiesenfeld

== Protestant churches ==
In 1905, these Protestant parish churches served towns in Kreis Koschmin:

- Borek
- Kobylin
- Krotoschin
- Pogorzela
- Dobrzyca
- Koschmin
- Königsfeld

== Communities ==
These records come from the 1905 Prussian gazetteer Gemeindelexikon für das Königreich Preußen.

Town	Polish Spelling	Type	1905 Pop	Prot.	Cath.	Jews	Civil Ofc	Police Ofc	Court Ofc	Cath. Ch	Prot. Ch	Notes	More
Alt Bruczkow		Village	330	0	330	0	Borek	Borek	Koschmin	Cerekwice	Borek	(Bruczkow)	
Alt Obra		Village	328	0	328	0	Koschmin	Koschmin	Koschmin	Walkow	Koschmin		
Berdychow	Berdychów	Village	42	40	2	0	Wiesenfeld	Pogorzela	Krotoschin	Wiesenfeld	Kobylin		
Bergelsdorf		Estate	256	26	230	0	Wiesenfeld	Pogorzela	Koschmin	Kobylin	Kobylin		
Boleslawowo		Village	284	0	284	0	Borek	Borek	Koschmin	Cerekwice	Borek		
Borek		Town	2086	201	1794	91	Borek	Borek	Koschmin	Borek	Borek		
Borzencice		Village	867	18	849	0	Koschmin	Koschmin	Koschmin	Walkow	Koschmin		
Bruczkow	Bruczków	Estate	254	0	254	0	Borek	Borek	Koschmin	Cerekwice	Borek		
Bulakow		Village	304	0	304	0	Pogorzela	Pogorzela	Koschmin	Pogorzela	Pogorzela		
Cegielnia		Village	224	7	217	0	Koschmin	Koschmin	Koschmin	Koschmin	Koschmin		
Celestynowo		Village	127	0	127	0	Borek	Borek	Koschmin	Borek	Borek		
Czarnysad		Village	110	33	77	0	Koschmin	Koschmin	Koschmin	Koschmin	Koschmin		
Czarnysad		Estate	141	0	141	0	Koschmin	Koschmin	Koschmin	Koschmin	Koschmin		
Dzierzanow	Dzierzanów	Village	197	0	197	0	Starygrod	Pogorzela	Krotoschin	Margarethendorf	Krotoschin		
Dzierzanow		Estate	202	11	191	0	Starygrod	Pogorzela	Koschmin	Margarethendorf	Krotoschin		
Ellerode		Village	211	195	9	0	Koschmin	Koschmin	Koschmin	Walkow	Dobrzyca		
Fredrichswert	Rojewo	Village	109	95	14	0	Starygrod	Pogorzela	Krotoschin	Starygrod	Kobylin		
Galewo		Village	691	8	683	0	Koschmin	Koschmin	Koschmin	Walkow	Dobrzyca		
Galonski		Village	138	0	138	0	Koschmin	Koschmin	Koschmin	Radenz	Koschmin		
Gloginin		Village	284	2	282	0	Borek	Borek	Koschmin	Cerekwice	Borek		
Gluchowo		Village	330	7	323	0	Pogorzela	Pogorzela	Koschmin	Pogorzela	Pogorzela		
Goreczki		Estate	184	11	173	0	Borek	Borek	Koschmin	Cerekwice	Borek		
Gorka	Górka	Village	105	0	105	0	Wiesenfeld	Pogorzela	Krotoschin	Kobylin	Kobylin		
Gosciejewo		Village	285	0	285	0	Koschmin	Koschmin	Koschmin	Mokronos	Kobylin		
Gosciejewo		Estate	94	0	94	0	Koschmin	Koschmin	Koschmin	Mokronos	Koschmin		
Guminiec		Village	500	483	17	0	Pogorzela	Pogorzela	Koschmin	Pogorzela	Pogorzela		
Hundsfeld	Psiepole	Estate	221	37	184	0	Koschmin	Koschmin	Koschmin	Koschmin	Koschmin		
Kaczagorka		Village	154	0	154	0	Pogorzela	Pogorzela	Koschmin	Mokronos	Koschmin		
Kaniewo		Village	288	35	253	0	Koschmin	Koschmin	Koschmin	Wielowieś	Koschmin		
Karlshof	Karolewo	Estate	526	1	525	0	Borek	Borek	Koschmin	Borek	Borek		
Klein Zalesie		Village	197	0	197	0	Wiesenfeld	Pogorzela	Krotoschin	Pempowo	Königsfeld		
Kleinwald		Estate	147	12	135	0	Wiesenfeld	Pogorzela	Krotoschin	Pempowo	Königsfeld		
Koschmin		Town	4812	914	3580	312	Koschmin	Koschmin	Koschmin	Koschmin	Koschmin		
Kromolice	Kromolice	Village	449	73	376	0	Starygrod	Pogorzela	Krotoschin	Wielowieś	Kobylin		
Kromolice	Kromolice	Estate	420	0	420	0	Starygrod	Pogorzela	Krotoschin	Pempowo	Kobylin		
Kuklinow	Kuklinów	Village	294	0	294	0	Starygrod	Pogorzela	Koschmin	Starygrod	Kobylin		
Kuklinow	Kuklinów	Estate	569	0	569	0	Starygrod	Pogorzela	Krotoschin	Starygrod	Kobylin		
Königsfeld	Liszkowo / Liszkow / Zalesia wielkie / Zalesia mal	Village	495	329	166	0	Wiesenfeld	Pogorzela	Krotoschin	Pempowo	Königsfeld	(Groß Saesche)	
Ladenberg		Village	187	140	47	0	Koschmin	Koschmin	Krotoschin	Walkow	Koschmin		
Lagiewnik	Łagiewniki	Village	158	30	128	0	Wiesenfeld	Pogorzela	Koschmin	Wielowieś	Kobylin		
Lagiewnik		Estate	200	0	200	0	Wiesenfeld	Pogorzela	Krotoschin	Wiesenfeld	Kobylin		
Leonowo		Village	160	0	160	0	Borek	Borek	Koschmin	Borek	Borek		
Lipowiec	Lipowiec	Village	169	111	58	0	Koschmin	Koschmin	Koschmin	Koschmin	Koschmin		
Lipowiec	Lipowiec	Estate	267	31	236	0	Koschmin	Koschmin	Koschmin	Koschmin	Koschmin		
Malgow		Village	151	0	151	0	Pogorzela	Pogorzela	Koschmin	Mokronos	Pogorzela		
Mokronos	Mokronos	Village	348	0	348	0	Starygrod	Koschmin	Koschmin	Mokronos	Koschmin		
Neu Obra		Village	313	22	291	0	Koschmin	Koschmin	Koschmin	Walkow	Koschmin		
Obra		Estate	345	23	318	4	Koschmin	Koschmin	Koschmin	Walkow	Koschmin		
Ochla	Ochla / Ochlą	Village	98	41	57	0	Wiesenfeld	Pogorzela	Krotoschin	Wielowieś	Kobylin		
Ochla	Ochla	Estate	108	14	94	0	Wiesenfeld	Pogorzela	Krotoschin	Wiesenfeld	Kobylin		
Orla		Village	146	22	124	0	Koschmin	Koschmin	Koschmin	Koschmin	Kobylin		
Orla		Estate	359	34	325	0	Koschmin	Koschmin	Koschmin	Koschmin	Koschmin		
Paradow		Village	133	0	133	0	Wiesenfeld	Pogorzela	Krotoschin	Wielowieś	Kobylin		
Pogorzalki		Village	339	0	339	0	Borek	Borek	Koschmin	Radenz	Kobylin		
Pogorzela		Town	1732	403	1308	17	Pogorzela	Pogorzela	Koschmin	Pogorzela	Pogorzela		
Pogorzela		Estate	525	72	453	0	Pogorzela	Pogorzela	Koschmin	Pogorzela	Pogorzela		
Koschmin Hauland, Kreis Koschmin Polnisch Koschmin Hauland		Village	588	66	522	0	Koschmin	Koschmin	Koschmin	Koschmin	Koschmin		
Radenz	Borzęciczki	Estate	1346	183	1163	0	Koschmin	Borek	Koschmin	Radenz	Koschmin		
Romanow		Village	166	10	156	0	Starygrod	Pogorzela	Krotoschin	Starygrod	Krotoschin		
Rzemichow	Rzemiechów	Village	73	20	53	0	Wiesenfeld	Pogorzela	Krotoschin	Baschlow	Kobylin		
Siebenwald		Village	222	200	22	0	Borek	Borek	Koschmin	Borek	Borek		
Siedmiorogowo		Estate	468	0	468	0	Borek	Borek	Koschmin	Borek	Borek		
Skalow		Village	113	0	113	0	Koschmin	Koschmin	Koschmin	Mokronos	Kobylin		
Skokow		Village	445	0	445	0	Borek	Borek	Koschmin	Borek	Borek		
Sroki	Sroki	Village	124	0	124	0	Wiesenfeld	Pogorzela	Krotoschin	Pempowo	Kobylin		
Staniewo		Village	438	22	416	0	Koschmin	Koschmin	Koschmin	Koschmin	Koschmin		
Staniewo		Estate	135	16	119	0	Koschmin	Koschmin	Koschmin	Koschmin	Koschmin		
Starkowiec	Starkowiec	Village	66	9	57	0	Wiesenfeld	Pogorzela	Krotoschin	Wiesenfeld	Kobylin		
Starkowiec	Starkowiec	Estate	179	1	178	0	Wiesenfeld	Pogorzela	Krotoschin	Wiesenfeld	Kobylin		
Starygrod	Starygród	Estate	194	0	194	0	Starygrod	Pogorzela	Krotoschin	Starygrod	Krotoschin		
Susnia	Suśnia	Village	170	0	170	0	Starygrod	Koschmin	Krotoschin	Mokronos	Koschmin		
Szelejewo		Village	392	0	392	0	Pogorzela	Borek	Koschmin	Groß Strzelce	Pogorzela		
Szelejewo		Estate	505	90	414	0	Pogorzela	Borek	Koschmin	Groß Strzelce	Pogorzela		
Targoszynce	Targoszyce	Estate	126	0	126	0	Wiesenfeld	Pogorzela	Krotoschin	Wiesenfeld	Kobylin		
Trzecianow		Village	181	0	181	0	Borek	Borek	Koschmin	Borek	Borek		
Unislaw	Unisław	Village	157	0	157	0	Starygrod	Koschmin	Krotoschin	Wielowieś	Koschmin		
Walerianowo		Village	155	4	151	0	Borek	Borek	Koschmin	Cerekwice	Borek		
Walkow		Village	369	38	331	0	Koschmin	Koschmin	Koschmin	Walkow	Koschmin		
Wielowieś	Wielowieś	Village	356	0	356	0	Starygrod	Koschmin	Krotoschin	Wielowieś	Koschmin		
Wiesenfeld	Wyganów	Village	241	187	54	0	Wiesenfeld	Pogorzela	Krotoschin	Wiesenfeld	Kobylin		
Willanow		Village	219	8	211	0	Wiesenfeld	Pogorzela	Krotoschin	Wiesenfeld	Kobylin		
Wittenburg		Village	248	203	45	0	Pogorzela	Pogorzela	Koschmin	Pogorzela	Pogorzela		
Wrotkow		Village	288	8	280	0	Koschmin	Koschmin	Koschmin	Mokronos	Koschmin		
Wrotkow		Estate	317	18	299	0	Koschmin	Koschmin	Koschmin	Mokronos	Koschmin		
Wyrembin		Village	220	0	220	0	Koschmin	Borek	Krotoschin	Radenz	Koschmin		
Wzionchow		Village	148	0	148	0	Pogorzela	Pogorzela	Koschmin	Mokronos	Pogorzela		
Wzionchow		Estate	488	21	467	0	Pogorzela	Pogorzela	Koschmin	Pogorzela	Pogorzela		
Zimnawoda		Estate	322	0	322	0	Borek	Borek	Koschmin	Cerekwice	Borek		

Town	Polish Spelling	Type	1905 Pop	Dwellings	Belonged to...	Notes
Antonin			24	1	Szelejewo	
Baran			60	2	Dzierzanow	
Begräbnisplatz der jüdischen Gemeinde Koschmin			7	1	Orla	
Berdychow			7	1	Radenz	Prot&Pol=Pogorzela; Cath=Mokronos
Bielawy			128	7	Szelejewo	
Bikenfeld			19	1	Radenz	AG=Krotoschin; Cath=Wielowieś; SA=Starygrod; Pol=Koschmin
Buchwald			102	5	Pogorzela	
Bulakow Abbau			55	9	Bulakow	
Bulakow Domäne			165	12	Radenz	Prot&SA&Pol=Pogorzela; Cath=Mokronos
Bulakow Forsthaus			6	1	Radenz	Prot&SA&Pol=Pogorzela; Cath=Mokronos
Cielmice			160	7	Siedmiorogowo	
Dembowitz			77	4	Radenz	
Dobrapomac Forsthaus			13	2	Wzionchow	
Domanice			70	6	Siedmiorogowo	
Dorotheenhof	Dorotowo		27	2	Karlshof	
Dymatsch			15	2	Neu Obra	
Dymatsch			12	1	Alt Obra	
Elisenhof			93	5	Pogorzela	
Elstern			22	1	Bergelsdorf	Cath=Pempowo
Fijalew			100	17	Willanow	
Frankow			38	3	Kuklinow	
Fredrichswert Bahnhof			18	3	Fredrichswert	
Galewo Parzellen			52	6	Galewo	
Gloginin			78	4	Zimnawoda	
Grembow			168	21	Koschmin	
Groß Pogorzalki			134	21	Pogorzalki	
Hundsfeld			27	2	Hundsfeld	
Josefowo			12	2	Obra	
Josefowo			24	3	Gosciejewo	
Josefowo			29	4	Ochla	
Josefowo			39	2	Szelejewo	
Kaczagorka			135	5	Radenz	Cath=Mokronos; SA&Pol=Pogorzela
Kamionka			11	1	Dzierzanow	
Kladka			36	3	Orla	
Klein Pogorzalki			180	25	Pogorzalki	
Kollas	Kolas		18	2	Lipowiec	
Koschmin Kolonie			135	20	Koschmin	
Kuklinow Forsthaus			10	1	Kuklinow	
Lilienhain Forsthaus			8	1	Pogorzela	
Lipowiec	Lipowiec		100	4	Kuklinow	Cath=Margarethendorf
Lissagora			43	8	Borek	page 78
Louisenstein			9	1	Borek	
Ludwigshof			73	4	Radenz	Cath=Mokronos; SA&Pol=Pogorzela
Magielka			31	1	Orla	
Magielka			28	3	Cegielnia	
Malgow			182	5	Wzionchow	
Marianow			45	7	Paradow	
Maximilianowo			70	10	Gloginin	
Mittenwalde			21	2	Radenz	SA&Pol=Pogorzela
Mokronos	Mokronos		156	6	Kromolice	Prot&Pol=Koschmin; Cath=Mokronos
Mycielin			28	2	Radenz	
Mühlenabbau			26	4	Koschmin	
Nepomucenowo			111	16	Kromolice	
Neu Bruczkow			93	12	Alt Bruczkow	
Nowina			48	1	Wzionchow	
Orlinka			13	1	Orla	
Palmirowo			18	2	Wrotkow	
Paniwola			32	5	Gosciejewo	
Radenz Radenz			25	3	Pogorzalki	
Riedelshof			17	3	Koschmin	
Rzemichow			122	7	Kuklinow	Cath=Baschkow; SA=Wiesenfeld
Salonski			161	7	Radenz	SA&Pol=Koschmin
Schloß Koschmin			104	4	Lipowiec	
Serafinow			68	4	Wrotkow	
Skalow			69	4	Wrotkow	
Skokowko			136	5	Karlshof	
Stanislawowo			44	6	Kromolice	
Starygrod Probstei			3	1	Romanow	'provost's land'
Staw			45	1	Wzionchow	
Stawiszyn Forsthaus			12	1	Karlshof	
Stefanowo			114	6	Szelejewo	
Steinburg	Nowa osada 1872		45	1	Orla	'osada powstała na terytoryum Orli'
Stolowo			17	1	Karlshof	
Suchylas			11	1	Kuklinow	
Szymanowo			61	2	Obra	
Trzecianow			200	4	Karlshof	
Weihhof			302	41	Koschmin	
Weizenau			93	3	Pogorzela	
Weiße Rose	Białaróża		4	1	Bergelsdorf	(Weißerose)
Wielowieś	Wielowieś		186	6	Radenz	AG=Krotoschin; Cath=Wielowieś; SA=Starygrod; Pol=Koschmin
Wronow			202	6	Radenz	AG=Krotoschin; Cath=Wielowieś; SA=Starygrod; Pol=Koschmin
Wyganow Probstei & Schule			13	3	Willanow	'provost's land & school'
Zuskesche Ziegelei			5	1	Borek	
