= Liz (disambiguation) =

Liz is a feminine nickname or given name. It may also refer to:

== People ==
- Liz (surname)
- Liz (American singer), stage name of American singer Elizabeth Nicole Abrams
- Liz (South Korean singer), real name Kim Jiwon, South Korean singer, member of Ive

== Other uses ==
- Liż, a village in Poland
- Liz: The Elizabeth Taylor Story, a 1995 biographical television film
- LIZ, the IATA code for Loring International Airport, Limestone, Maine, United States
