= Celestynów =

Celestynów may refer to the following places:

- Celestynów, Opoczno County in Łódź Voivodeship (central Poland)
- Celestynów, Zgierz County in Łódź Voivodeship (central Poland)
- Celestynów, Otwock County in Masovian Voivodeship (east-central Poland)
- Celestynów, Zwoleń County in Masovian Voivodeship (east-central Poland)
- Celestynów, Greater Poland Voivodeship (west-central Poland)
