= Długołęka =

Długołęka may refer to the following places in Poland:

- Długołęka, Lower Silesian Voivodeship (south-west Poland)
- Długołęka, Podlaskie Voivodeship (north-east Poland)
- Długołęka, Łódź Voivodeship (central Poland)
- Długołęka, Świętokrzyskie Voivodeship (south-central Poland)
- Długołęka, Masovian Voivodeship (east-central Poland)
- Długołęka, Greater Poland Voivodeship (west-central Poland)
- Długołęka, Warmian-Masurian Voivodeship (north Poland)
- Długołęka, West Pomeranian Voivodeship (north-west Poland)
