= Sroki =

Sroki may refer to:

- Sroki, Poland, a village near Kobylin
- Sroki, Croatia, a village near Viškovo
