= Targosz =

Targosz is a surname. It may refer to:

- Łukasz Targosz (born 1977), Polish film composer, and music and film producer
- Stanisław Targosz (1948–2013), Polish general

== See also ==
- Targoszów, a village in the administrative district of Gmina Stryszawa, within Sucha County, Lesser Poland Voivodeship, in southern Poland
- Targoszyce, a village in the administrative district of Gmina Kobylin, within Krotoszyn County, Greater Poland Voivodeship, in west-central Poland
- Targoszyn, a village in the administrative district of Gmina Mściwojów, within Jawor County, Lower Silesian Voivodeship, in south-western Poland
