= Jawory =

Jawory may refer to the following places:

- Jawory, Greater Poland Voivodeship (west-central Poland)
- Jawory, Pomeranian Voivodeship (north Poland)
- Jawory, Szczecinek County in West Pomeranian Voivodeship (north-west Poland)
