= Grodnica =

Grodnica may refer to the following places in Poland:

- Grodnica, Lower Silesian Voivodeship (south-west Poland)
- Grodnica, Greater Poland Voivodeship (west-central Poland)
