= Rzemiechów =

Village in Poland

- Village
- Location within Poland
- Coordinates: 51°42′43″N 17°16′20″E
- Country: Poland
- Voivodeship: Greater Poland
- County: Krotoszyn
- Gmina: Kobylin

Area
  - Total: 0.114 km^{2} (0.044 sq mi)
- Elevation: 103.00 m (337.93 ft)

Population (2015)
  - Total: 43
  - Density: 377.6/km^{2} (978/sq mi)
- Time zone: UTC+01:00 (CEST)
  - Summer (DST): UTC+02:00 (CEST)
- ZIP Code: 63-740
- Area code: (+48) 65
- Vehicle registration: PKR
- HDI (2015): 0.8538
- SIMC code: 0371357

Rzemiechów [ʐɛˈmjɛxuf] is a village in the administrative district of Gmina Kobylin, within Krotoszyn County, Greater Poland Voivodeship, in west-central Poland.

== Geography ==
The village has an elevation of 103.00 m (337.93 ft) above sea level, and a total area of 0.114 km^{2} (0.044 mi^{2}). It is located on the left bank of the Orla River, approximately 4 kilometres (2 mi) east of Kobylin.

== History ==
As part of the region of Greater Poland, i.e. the cradle of the Polish state, the area formed part of Poland since its establishment in the 10th century. It was a private village of Polish nobility, including the Starkowiecki, Naramowski, Wałknowski and Sokolnicki families, administratively located in the Pyzdry County in the Kalisz Voivodeship in the Greater Poland Province of the Kingdom of Poland.

In the Second Partition of Poland, in 1793, it was annexed by Prussia. Following the successful Greater Poland uprising of 1806, it was regained by Poles and included within the short-lived Duchy of Warsaw. After the duchy's dissolution in 1815, it was re-annexed by Prussia, within which it formed part of the initially autonomous Grand Duchy of Poznań. During that period (1815–1848), it belonged to the larger villages in the district of Kreis Krotoschin in the administrative region of Posen. Rzemiechów belonged to the Kuklinów district of this county and was part of the Kuklinów estate owned by Józef Chełkowski. Following World War I, Poland regained independence and control of the village.

== Population ==
According to the official census from 1837, the village hit a possible peak population at 196 inhabitants, who lived in 19 houses. When the Rzemiechów forest clearing later took place, the village was noted to have been reduced to only 1 house and 4 inhabitants.

Eventually the population rose again, and in 1975, the census showed the village at a population of 34 inhabitants. In the 1990 census, the population dropped by one person to 33 inhabitants. In the 2000 census, the village population rose by ten to 43 inhabitants. In the most recent 2015 census, the village population remained the same at 43 inhabitants. The population of the village is expected to drop back to only 31 in 2050, and 18 in 2100.
