= Stawiszyn (disambiguation) =

Stawiszyn may refer to the following places:

- Stawiszyn in Greater Poland Voivodeship (west-central Poland)
- Stawiszyn, Gostyń County in Greater Poland Voivodeship (west-central Poland)
- Stawiszyn, Masovian Voivodeship (east-central Poland)
