= Studzianna, Greater Poland Voivodeship =

Studzianna
- Village
- Location within Poland
- Coordinates: 51°57′N 17°8′E
- Country: Poland
- Voivodeship: Greater Poland
- County: Gostyń
- Gmina: Borek Wielkopolski

Studzianna [stuˈd͡ʑanna] is a village in the administrative district of Gmina Borek Wielkopolski, within Gostyń County, Greater Poland Voivodeship, in west-central Poland.
