= Cyryl Ratajski =

Polish politician and lawyer

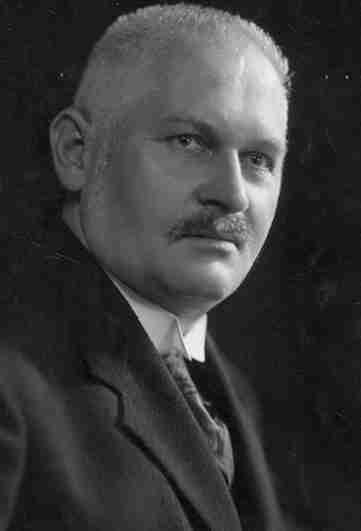
- Born: 3 March 1875; Zalesie Wielkie, Posen, Prussia, German Empire
- Died: 19 October 1942 (aged 67); Warsaw, General Government, Nazi Germany

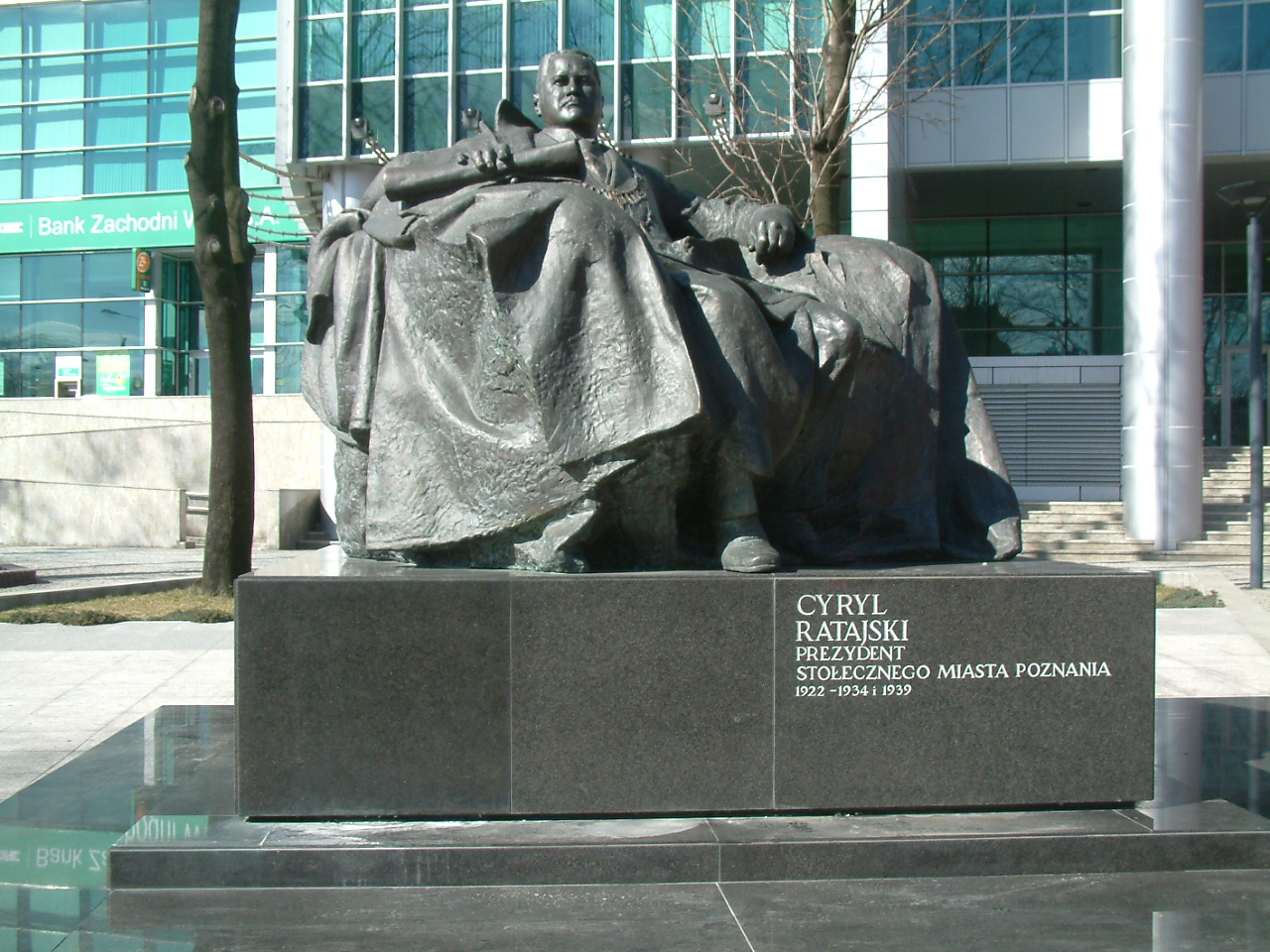
Monument of Cyryl Ratajski in Poznań

Cyryl Ratajski (3 March 1875 – 19 October 1942) was a Polish politician and lawyer.

== Life and career ==
Ratajski was born in Zalesie Wielkie, then part of the German Empire, on 3 March 1875. He graduated from a high school in Poznań and studied law at the University of Berlin. After leaving university, he worked as a court clerk in Torgau. He opened his own law firm in Racibórz after passing a judge's exam in 1905. He moved back to Poznań in 1911 to look after his father-in-law's business.

He became an envoy for the Supreme Popular Council to the Polish National Committee in Paris in January 1919. He served as mayor of Poznań between 1922 and 1924 and again between 1925 and 1934 as well as Minister of Interior between 1924 and 1925. From 1937, he was a member of the Labor Party. He became mayor of Poznań again in September 1939 before being deported to German-occupied Poland in early 1940. He was the first Head of Delegate's Office of the Polish government in exile (Delegat Rządu na Kraj) on 3 December 1940 until 5 August 1942 when he was replaced by Jan Piekałkiewicz due to ill health.

He died on 19 October 1942 in Warsaw.

== See also ==
- Polish Secret State
- Government Delegate's Office at Home
