= Strumiany, Gostyń County =

Strumiany
- Village
- Location within Poland
- Coordinates: 51°55′N 17°12′E
- Country: Poland
- Voivodeship: Greater Poland
- County: Gostyń
- Gmina: Borek Wielkopolski

Strumiany [struˈmjanɨ] is a village in the administrative district of Gmina Borek Wielkopolski, within Gostyń County, Greater Poland Voivodeship, in west-central Poland.
