= Zimnowoda, Greater Poland Voivodeship =

Zimnowoda
- Village
- Location within Poland
- Coordinates: 51°52′43″N 17°18′8″E
- Country: Poland
- Voivodeship: Greater Poland
- County: Gostyń
- Gmina: Borek Wielkopolski
- Population: 210

Zimnowoda [ʑimnɔˈvɔda] is a village in the administrative district of Gmina Borek Wielkopolski, within Gostyń County, Greater Poland Voivodeship, in west-central Poland.
