= Bolesławów, Greater Poland Voivodeship =

Bolesławów
- Village
- Location within Poland
- Coordinates: 51°54′N 17°18′E
- Country: Poland
- Voivodeship: Greater Poland
- County: Gostyń
- Gmina: Borek Wielkopolski

Bolesławów [bɔlɛˈswavuf] is a village in the administrative district of Gmina Borek Wielkopolski, within Gostyń County, Greater Poland Voivodeship, in west-central Poland.
