= Maksymilianów, Greater Poland Voivodeship =

Maksymilianów
- Village
- Location within Poland
- Coordinates: 51°51′27″N 17°19′21″E
- Country: Poland
- Voivodeship: Greater Poland
- County: Gostyń
- Gmina: Borek Wielkopolski

Maksymilianów [maksɨmiˈljanuf] is a village in the administrative district of Gmina Borek Wielkopolski, within Gostyń County, Greater Poland Voivodeship, in west-central Poland.
