= Gmina Kobylin =

Gmina Kobylin Kobylin Commune
- Gmina
- Coat of arms

- Coordinates (Kobylin): 51°42′N 17°14′E
- Country: Poland
- Voivodeship: Greater Poland
- County: Krotoszyn
- Seat: Kobylin

Area
  - Total: 112.37 km^{2} (43.39 sq mi)

Population (2006)
  - Total: 8,039
  - Density: 71.54/km^{2} (185.3/sq mi)
  - Urban: 3,084
  - Rural: 4,955
- Website: http://www.kobylin.com.pl/

Gmina Kobylin is an urban-rural gmina (administrative district) in Krotoszyn County, Greater Poland Voivodeship, in west-central Poland. Its seat is the town of Kobylin, which lies approximately 14 kilometres (9 mi) west of Krotoszyn and 81 km (50 mi) south of the regional capital Poznań.

The gmina covers an area of 112.37 square kilometres (43.4 sq mi), and as of 2006 its total population is 8,039 (out of which the population of Kobylin amounts to 3,084, and the population of the rural part of the gmina is 4,955).

== Villages ==
Apart from the town of Kobylin, Gmina Kobylin contains the villages and settlements of Berdychów, Długołęka, Fijałów, Górka, Kuklinów, Łagiewniki, Nepomucenów, Raszewy, Rębiechów, Rojew, Rzemiechów, Smolice, Sroki, Starkowiec, Stary Kobylin, Starygród, Targoszyce, Wyganów, Zalesie Małe, Zalesie Wielkie and Zdziętawy.

== Neighbouring gminas ==
Gmina Kobylin is bordered by the gminas of Jutrosin, Koźmin Wielkopolski, Krotoszyn, Pępowo, Pogorzela and Zduny.
