= Pogorzela, Greater Poland Voivodeship =

Pogorzela
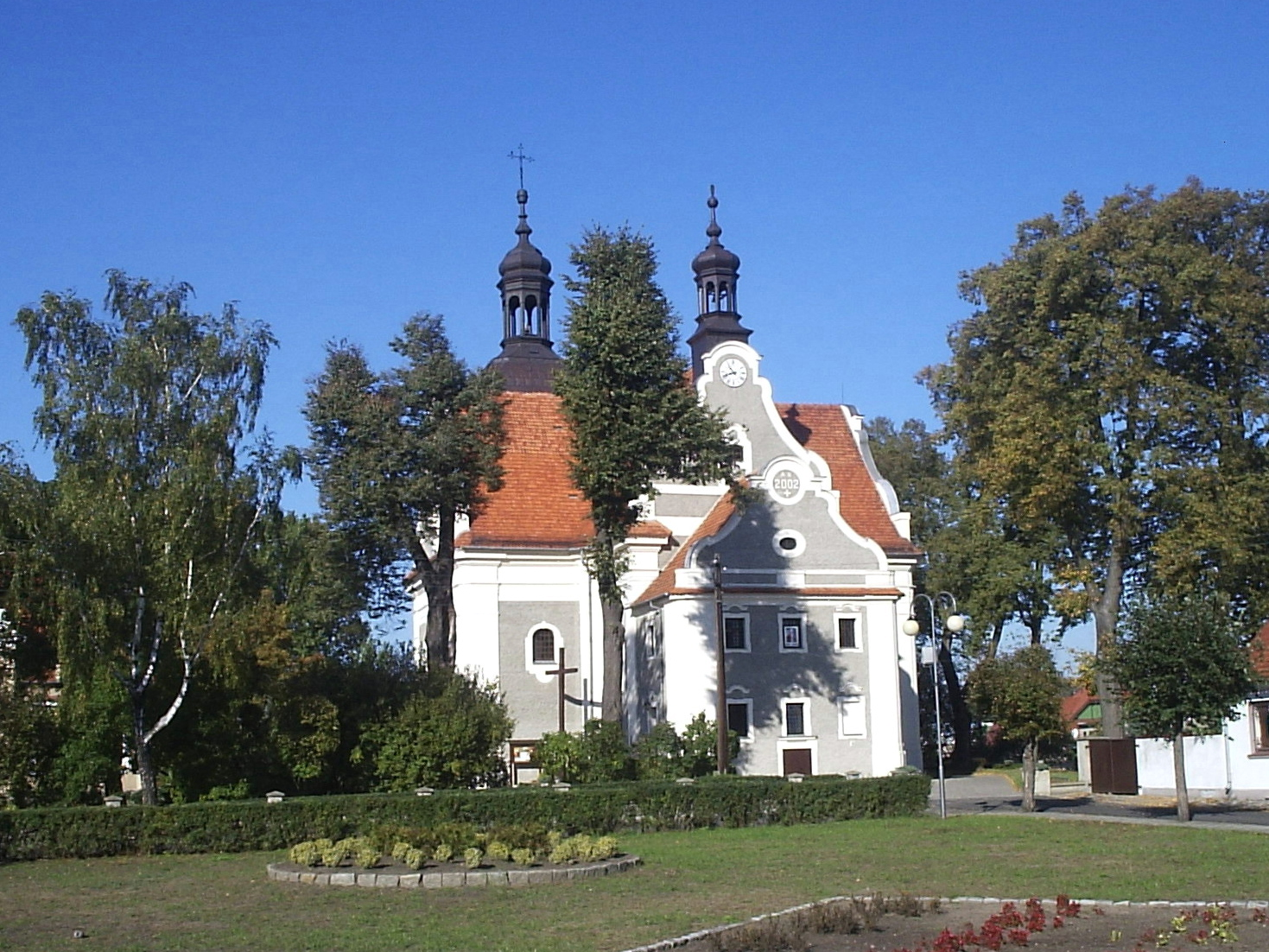
- Saint Michael the Archangel Church

- Coat of arms

- Location within Poland
- Coordinates: 51°49′15″N 17°14′5″E
- Country: Poland
- Voivodeship: Greater Poland
- County: Gostyń
- Gmina: Pogorzela

Area
  - Total: 4.34 km^{2} (1.68 sq mi)

Population (2010)
  - Total: 2,037
  - Density: 469/km^{2} (1,220/sq mi)
- Time zone: UTC+1 (CET)
  - Summer (DST): UTC+2 (CEST)
- Postal code: 63–860
- Vehicle registration: PGS
- Website: http://www.pogorzela.pl

Pogorzela [pɔɡɔˈʐɛla] is a town in Gostyń County, Greater Poland Voivodeship, Poland, with 2,037 inhabitants (as of 2010). Pogorzela is located on the western edge of the Kalisz Upland, at the junction of county roads Krotoszyn-Gostyń and the Koźmin Wielkopolski-Krobia.

== History ==
Pogorzela is first mentioned in the early 15th century when it was owned by the Pogorzelski family of Wczele coat of arms. Pogorzela was a private town, administratively located in the Pyzdry County in the Kalisz Voivodeship in the Greater Poland Province. It was the ancestral seat of the Pogorzelski family, and later on, it passed to other families, including the houses of Radzewski, Olewiński, Zbijewski.

The first church of Saint Michael was built before 1450. Around 1562 the town's heir, Stanisław Pogorzelski, converted to Protestantism and handed the church over to Protestants. In 1608 it was restored to Catholics.

The town received royal privileges for markets and fairs from Sigismund II Augustus in 1566, Sigismund III Vasa in 1617, Władysław IV Vasa in 1639 and Stanisław August Poniatowski in 1766. The town had guilds of shoemakers, weavers, coopers and millers. In 1766 King Stanisław August Poniatowski allowed the establishment of a shooting association.

In 1999 Pogorzela was administratively moved from Krotoszyn County to Gostyń County.

== Demographics ==
Historical population

Year	Pop.	±%
1841	1,301	—
1858	1,247	−4.2%
1867	1,352	+8.4%
1871	1,511	+11.8%
1890	1,525	+0.9%
1910	1,787	+17.2%
1921	1,662	−7.0%

Year	Pop.	±%
1931	1,592	−4.2%
1939	1,810	+13.7%
1950	1,396	−22.9%
1960	1,880	+34.7%
2006	1,974	+5.0%
2010	2,037	+3.2%
2017	2,098	+3.0%

== Landmarks ==
- Pogorzela Town Hall
- Late-Baroque Saint Michael the Archangel Church, built between 1778–1785
- Ratusz Memorial in honor of the victims of the Nazi German occupation of Poland
- Tyszkiewicz Palace,
- The Château Park, now a City Park,
- Windmill of 1870.
- Cemetery
- Former synagogue gutted during World War II
