= Łukaszew =

- Village
- Location within Poland
- Coordinates: 51°47′34″N 17°14′25″E
- Country: Poland
- Voivodeship: Greater Poland
- County: Gostyń
- Gmina: Pogorzela

Łukaszew [wuˈkaʂɛf] is a village in the administrative district of Gmina Pogorzela, within Gostyń County, Greater Poland Voivodeship, in west-central Poland.
