= Skokówko =

- Village
- Location within Poland
- Coordinates: 51°56′34″N 17°15′26″E
- Country: Poland
- Voivodeship: Greater Poland
- County: Gostyń
- Gmina: Borek Wielkopolski

Skokówko [skɔˈkufkɔ] is a village in the administrative district of Gmina Borek Wielkopolski, within Gostyń County, Greater Poland Voivodeship, in west-central Poland.
