= Józefów Ochelski =

- Village
- Location within Poland
- Coordinates: 51°46′43″N 17°13′39″E
- Country: Poland
- Voivodeship: Greater Poland
- County: Gostyń
- Gmina: Pogorzela

Józefów Ochelski (Polish pronunciation: [juˈzɛfuf ɔˈxɛlskʲi]) is a village in the administrative district of Gmina Pogorzela, within Gostyń County, Greater Poland Voivodeship, in west-central Poland.
