= Domanice, Greater Poland Voivodeship =

Domanice
- Settlement
- Location within Poland
- Coordinates: 51°51′21″N 17°16′32″E
- Country: Poland
- Voivodeship: Greater Poland
- County: Gostyń
- Gmina: Borek Wielkopolski

Domanice [dɔmaˈnit͡sɛ] is a settlement in the administrative district of Gmina Borek Wielkopolski, within Gostyń County, Greater Poland Voivodeship, in west-central Poland.
