= Stary Kobylin =

- Village
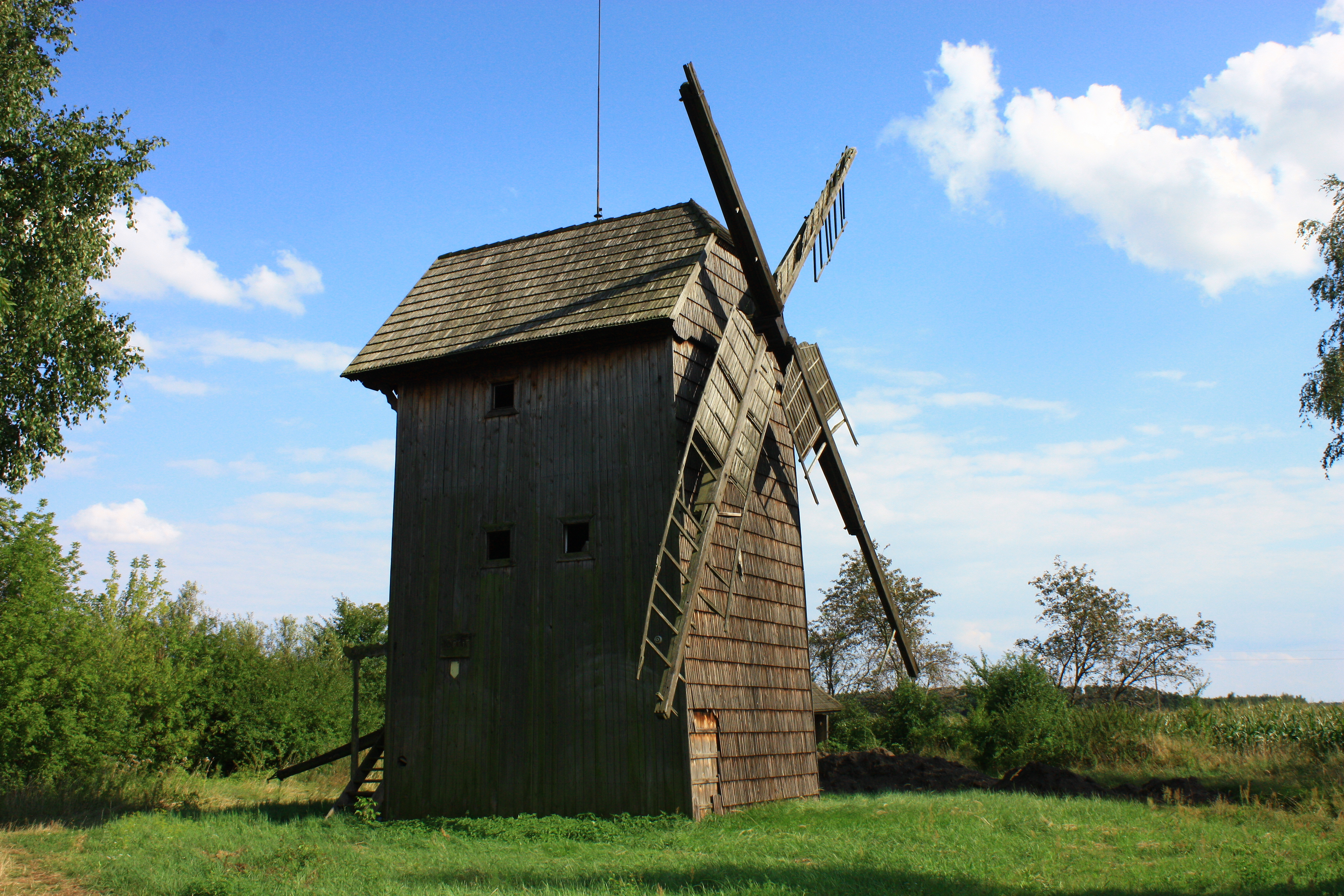

- Location within Poland
- Coordinates: 51°42′N 17°13′E
- Country: Poland
- Voivodeship: Greater Poland
- County: Krotoszyn
- Gmina: Kobylin

Stary Kobylin (Polish pronunciation: [ˈstarɨ kɔˈbɨlin]) is a village in the administrative district of Gmina Kobylin, within Krotoszyn County, Greater Poland Voivodeship, in west-central Poland.
