= Osówiec, Greater Poland Voivodeship =

Osówiec
- Village
- Location within Poland
- Coordinates: 51°55′17″N 17°07′22″E
- Country: Poland
- Voivodeship: Greater Poland
- County: Gostyń
- Gmina: Borek Wielkopolski

Osówiec [ɔˈsuvjɛt͡s] is a village in the administrative district of Gmina Borek Wielkopolski, within Gostyń County, Greater Poland Voivodeship, in west-central Poland.
