= Dobrapomoc =

- Village
- Location within Poland
- Coordinates: 51°49′N 17°10′E
- Country: Poland
- Voivodeship: Greater Poland
- County: Gostyń
- Gmina: Pogorzela

Dobrapomoc [dɔbraˈpɔmɔt͡s] is a village in the administrative district of Gmina Pogorzela, within Gostyń County, Greater Poland Voivodeship, in west-central Poland. In 1975-1998 Dobrapomoc was administratively in Szkaradowo.

The name Dobrapomoc translates into English as "good help".
