= Wziąchów =

- Village
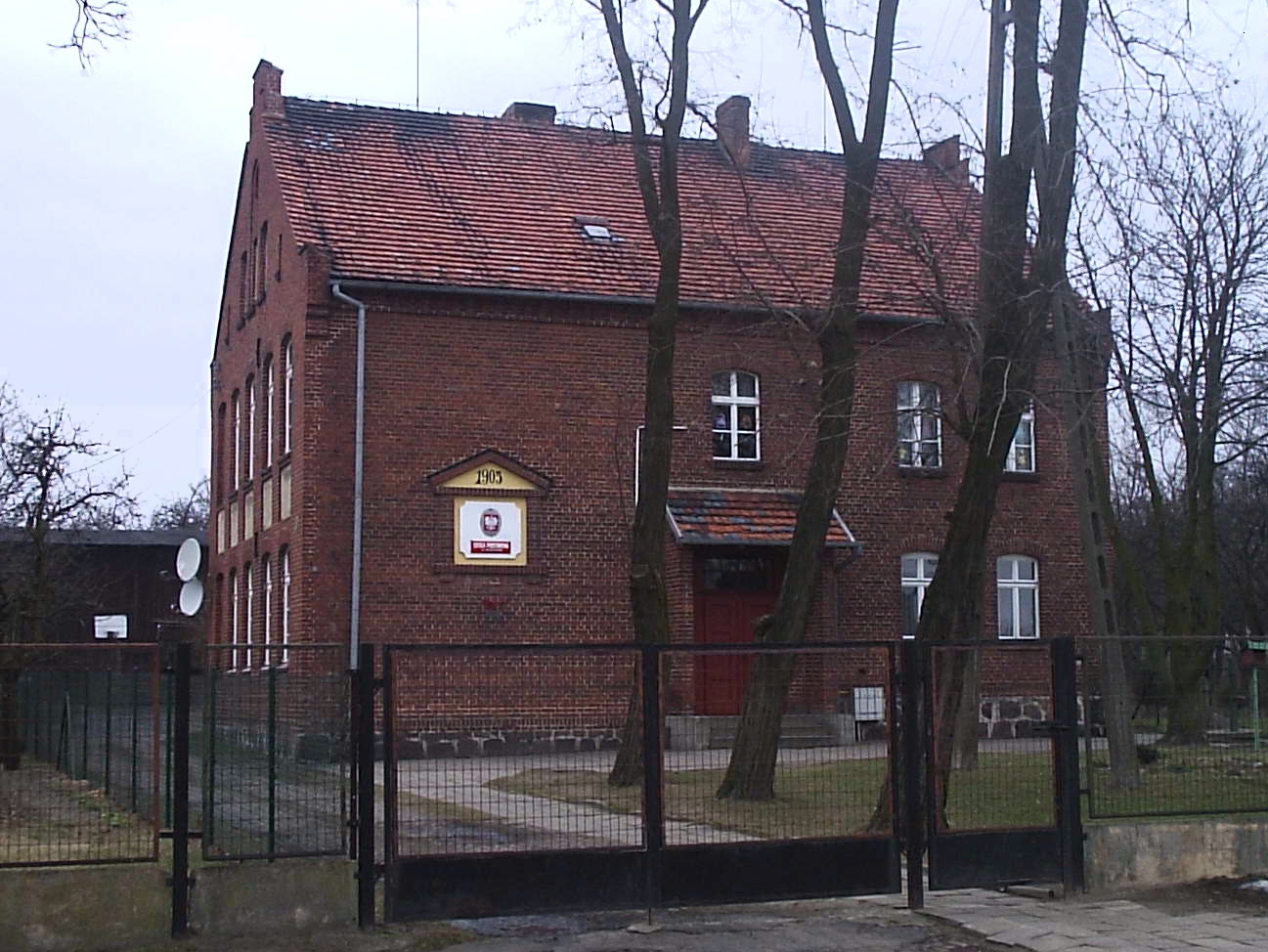
- School in Wziąchów

- Location within Poland
- Coordinates: 51°48′N 17°17′E
- Country: Poland
- Voivodeship: Greater Poland
- County: Gostyń
- Gmina: Pogorzela

Wziąchów [ˈvʑɔ̃xuf] is a village in the administrative district of Gmina Pogorzela, within Gostyń County, Greater Poland Voivodeship, in west-central Poland.
