= Karolew, Greater Poland Voivodeship =

Karolew
- Village
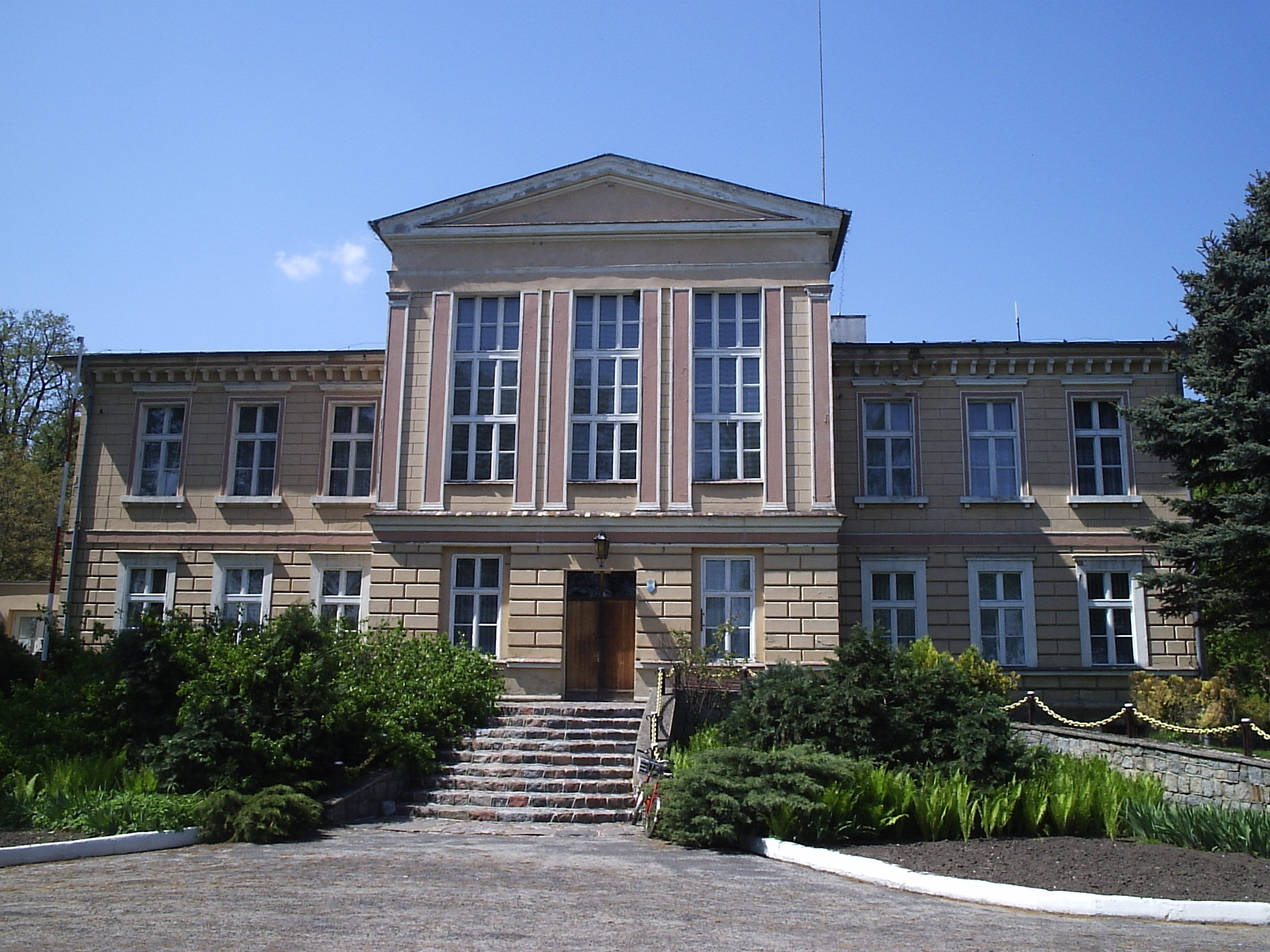
- Palace in Karolew

- Location within Poland
- Coordinates: 51°54′40″N 17°14′32″E
- Country: Poland
- Voivodeship: Greater Poland
- County: Gostyń
- Gmina: Borek Wielkopolski

Population
  - Total: 790

Karolew [kaˈrɔlɛf] is a village in the administrative district of Gmina Borek Wielkopolski, within Gostyń County, Greater Poland Voivodeship, in west-central Poland.
