= Dąbrówka, Gostyń County =

Dąbrówka
- Village
- Location within Poland
- Coordinates: 51°54′04″N 17°08′30″E
- Country: Poland
- Voivodeship: Greater Poland
- County: Gostyń
- Gmina: Borek Wielkopolski

Dąbrówka [dɔmˈbrufka] is a village in the administrative district of Gmina Borek Wielkopolski, within Gostyń County, Greater Poland Voivodeship, in west-central Poland.
