= Rębiechów =

- Village
- Location within Poland
- Coordinates: 51°43′N 17°11′E
- Country: Poland
- Voivodeship: Greater Poland
- County: Krotoszyn
- Gmina: Kobylin

Rębiechów [rɛmˈbjɛxuf] is a village in the administrative district of Gmina Kobylin, within Krotoszyn County, Greater Poland Voivodeship, in west-central Poland.
