= Leonów, Greater Poland Voivodeship =

Leonów
- Village
- Location within Poland
- Coordinates: 51°53′40″N 17°16′36″E
- Country: Poland
- Voivodeship: Greater Poland
- County: Gostyń
- Gmina: Borek Wielkopolski
- Population: 470

Leonów [lɛˈɔnuf] is a village in the administrative district of Gmina Borek Wielkopolski, within Gostyń County, Greater Poland Voivodeship, in west-central Poland.
