= Dorotów, Greater Poland Voivodeship =

Dorotów
- Settlement
- Location within Poland
- Coordinates: 51°53′31″N 17°12′48″E
- Country: Poland
- Voivodeship: Greater Poland
- County: Gostyń
- Gmina: Borek Wielkopolski

Dorotów [dɔˈrɔtuf] is a settlement in the administrative district of Gmina Borek Wielkopolski, within Gostyń County, Greater Poland Voivodeship, in west-central Poland.
