= Ustronie, Gostyń County =

Village in Greater Poland Voivodeship, Poland

Ustronie
- Village
- Location within Poland
- Coordinates: 51°54′5″N 17°10′33″E
- Country: Poland
- Voivodeship: Greater Poland
- County: Gostyń
- Gmina: Borek Wielkopolski
- Population: 50

Ustronie [usˈtrɔɲɛ] is a village in the administrative district of Gmina Borek Wielkopolski, within Gostyń County, Greater Poland Voivodeship, in west-central Poland.
