= Gmina Pogorzela =

Gmina Pogorzela Pogorzela Commune
- Gmina
- Coat of arms
- Interactive map of Gmina Pogorzela
- Coordinates (Pogorzela): 51°49′15″N 17°14′5″E
- Country: Poland
- Voivodeship: Greater Poland
- County: Gostyń
- Seat: Pogorzela

Area
  - Total: 96.47 km^{2} (37.25 sq mi)

Population (2006)
  - Total: 5,157
  - Density: 53.46/km^{2} (138.5/sq mi)
  - Urban: 1,974
  - Rural: 3,183
- Website: http://www.pogorzela.pl/

Gmina Pogorzela is an urban-rural gmina (administrative district) in Gostyń County, Greater Poland Voivodeship, in west-central Poland. Its seat is the town of Pogorzela, which lies approximately 17 kilometres (11 mi) south-east of Gostyń and 68 km (42 mi) south of the regional capital Poznań.

The gmina covers an area of 96.47 square kilometres (37.2 sq mi), and as of 2006 its total population is 5,157 (out of which the population of Pogorzela amounts to 1,974, and the population of the rural part of the gmina is 3,183).

== Villages ==
Apart from the town of Pogorzela, Gmina Pogorzela contains the villages and settlements of Bielawy Pogorzelskie, Bułaków, Dobrapomoc, Elżbietków, Głuchów, Głuchówek, Gumienice, Józefów Ochelski, Kaczagórka, Kromolice, Łukaszew, Małgów, Międzyborze, Nowiny, Ochla, Paradów, Stawy, Taczanówko and Wziąchów.

== Neighbouring gminas ==
Gmina Pogorzela is bordered by the gminas of Borek Wielkopolski, Kobylin, Koźmin Wielkopolski, Krotoszyn, Pępowo and Piaski.
