= Smolice, Greater Poland Voivodeship =

Smolice
- Village
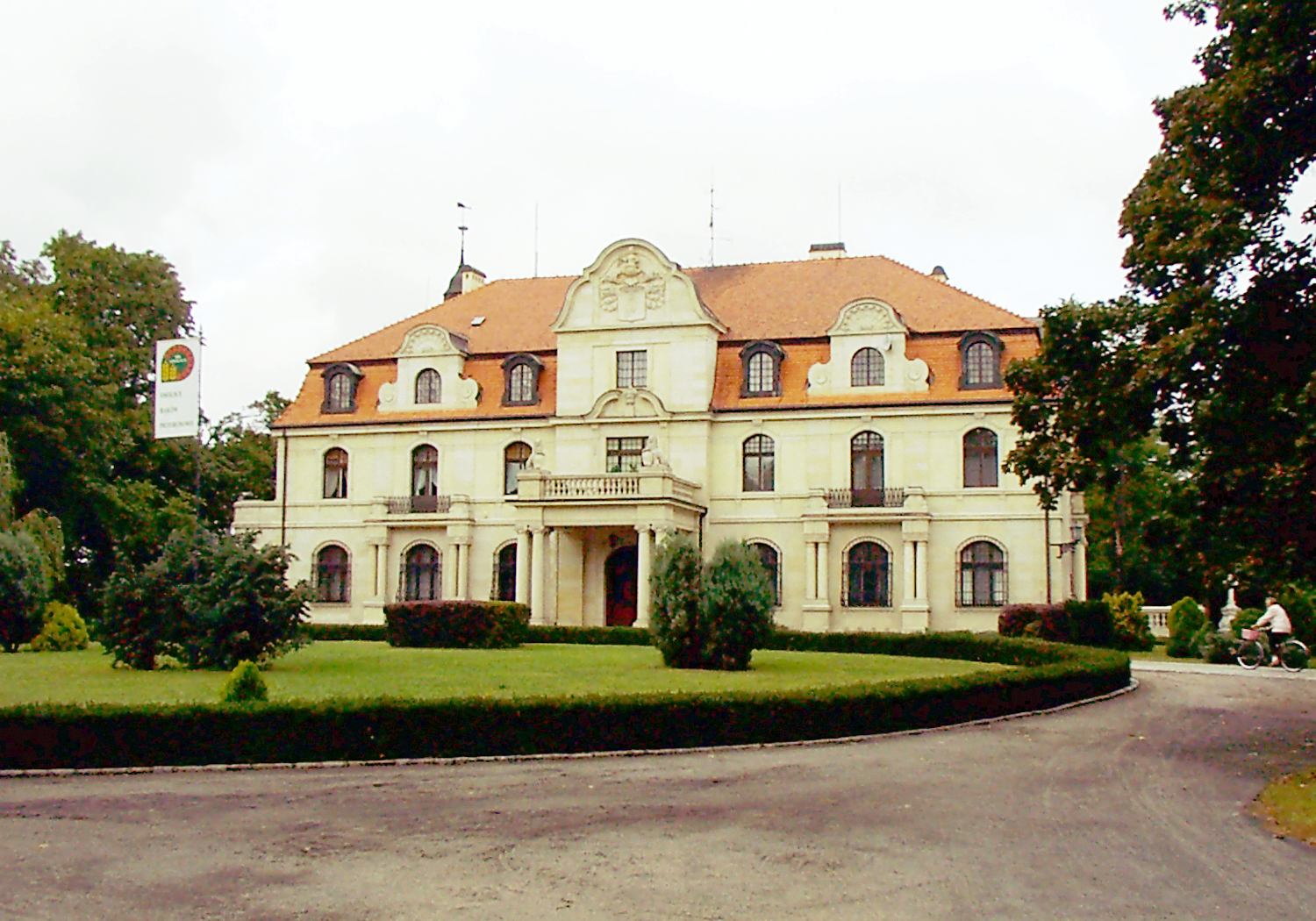
- Palace in Smolice

- Location within Poland
- Coordinates: 51°42′N 17°10′E
- Country: Poland
- Voivodeship: Greater Poland
- County: Krotoszyn
- Gmina: Kobylin
- Elevation: 109 m (358 ft)
- Population: 1,200

Smolice [smɔˈlit͡sɛ] is a village in the administrative district of Gmina Kobylin, within Krotoszyn County, Greater Poland Voivodeship, in west-central Poland.
