= Cielmice, Greater Poland Voivodeship =

Village in Poland

Cielmice
- Village
- Location within Poland
- Coordinates: 51°53′26″N 17°16′18″E
- Country: Poland
- Voivodeship: Greater Poland
- County: Gostyń
- Gmina: Borek Wielkopolski
- SIMC: 0369490

Cielmice [t͡ɕɛlˈmit͡sɛ] is a village in the administrative district of Gmina Borek Wielkopolski, within Gostyń County, Greater Poland Voivodeship, in west-central Poland.
