= Gmina Borek Wielkopolski =

Gmina Borek Wielkopolski Borek Wielkopolski Commune
- Gmina
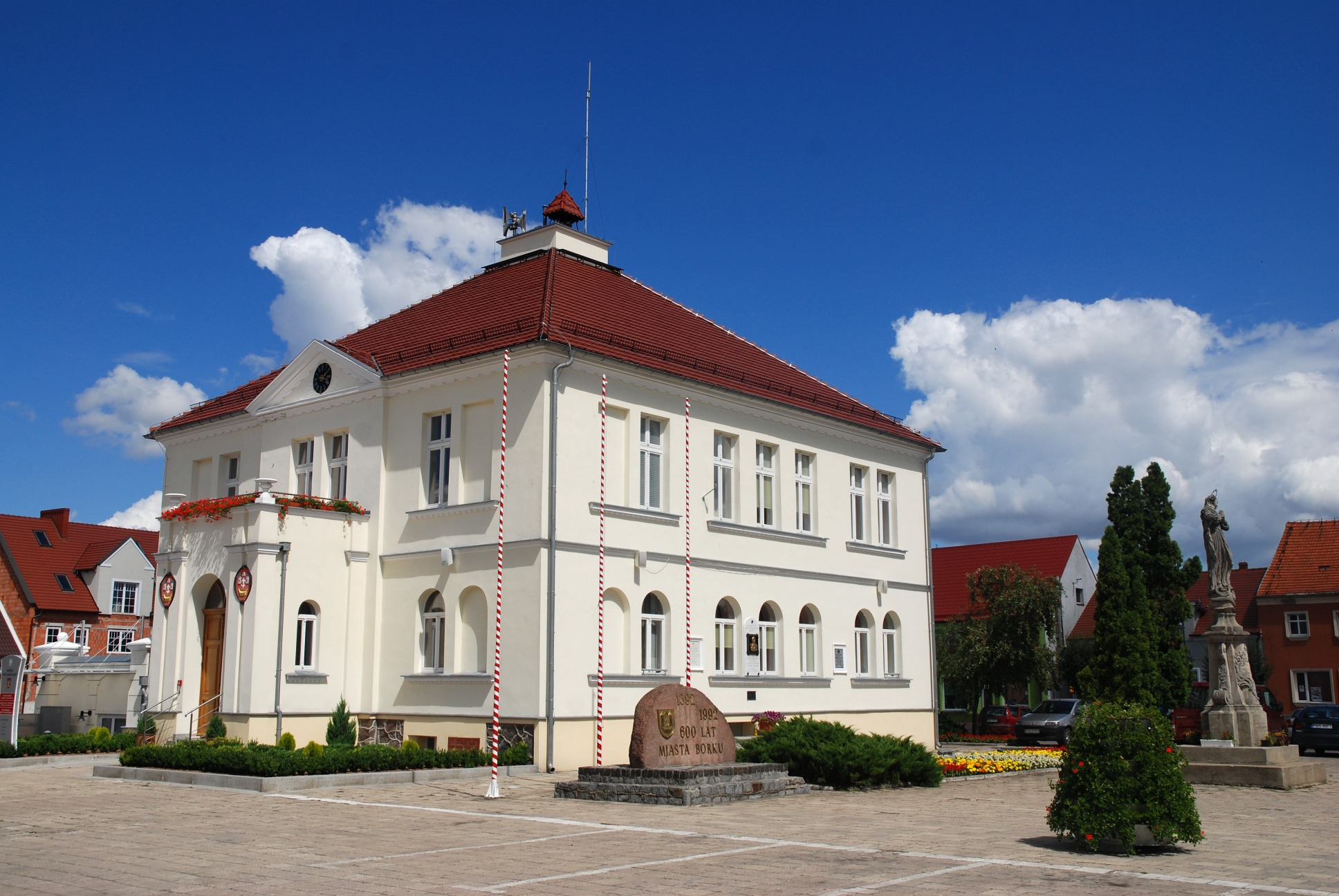
- Town Hall in Borek Wielkopolski, seat of the gmina office

- Coat of arms
- Interactive map of Gmina Borek Wielkopolski
- Coordinates (Borek Wielkopolski): 51°55′N 17°15′E
- Country: Poland
- Voivodeship: Greater Poland
- County: Gostyń
- Seat: Borek Wielkopolski

Area
  - Total: 127.58 km^{2} (49.26 sq mi)

Population (2006)
  - Total: 7,724
  - Density: 60.54/km^{2} (156.8/sq mi)
  - Urban: 2,486
  - Rural: 5,238
- Time zone: UTC+1 (CET)
  - Summer (DST): UTC+2 (CEST)
- Website: http://www.borekwlkp.home.pl/

Gmina Borek Wielkopolski is an urban-rural gmina (administrative district) in Gostyń County, Greater Poland Voivodeship, in west-central Poland. Its seat is the town of Borek Wielkopolski, which lies approximately 17 kilometres (11 mi) east of Gostyń and 59 km (37 mi) south-east of the regional capital Poznań.

The gmina covers an area of 127.58 square kilometres (49.3 sq mi), and as of 2006 its total population is 7,724, of which the population of Borek Wielkopolski is 2,486, and the population of the rural part of the gmina is 5,238.

== Villages ==
Apart from the town of Borek Wielkopolski, Gmina Borek Wielkopolski contains the villages and settlements of Bolesławów, Bruczków, Celestynów, Cielmice, Dąbrówka, Domanice, Dorotów, Frasunek, Głoginin, Grodnica, Jawory, Jawory PGR, Karolew, Koszkowo, Leonów, Liż, Maksymilianów, Osówiec, Siedmiorogów Drugi, Siedmiorogów Pierwszy, Skoków, Skokówko, Stawiszyn, Strumiany, Studzianna, Trzecianów, Trzecianów Osiedle, Ustronie, Wycisłowo, Wygoda, Zacisze, Zalesie and Zimnowoda.

== Neighbouring gminas ==
Gmina Borek Wielkopolski is bordered by the gminas of Dolsk, Jaraczewo, Koźmin Wielkopolski, Piaski and Pogorzela.
