= Zalesie Wielkie =

- Village
- Location within Poland
- Coordinates: 51°45′N 17°12′E
- Country: Poland
- Voivodeship: Greater Poland
- County: Krotoszyn
- Gmina: Kobylin

Zalesie Wielkie [zaˈlɛɕɛ ˈvjɛlkʲɛ] is a village in the administrative district of Gmina Kobylin, within Krotoszyn County, Greater Poland Voivodeship, in west-central Poland.

== Notable people ==
- Cyryl Ratajski, Polish politician
