= Zacisze, Gostyń County =

Zacisze
- Settlement
- Location within Poland
- Coordinates: 51°52′35″N 17°12′12″E
- Country: Poland
- Voivodeship: Greater Poland
- County: Gostyń
- Gmina: Borek Wielkopolski

Zacisze [zaˈt͡ɕiʂɛ] is a settlement in the administrative district of Gmina Borek Wielkopolski, within Gostyń County, Greater Poland Voivodeship, in west-central Poland.
