= Taczanówko =

- Village
- Location within Poland
- Coordinates: 51°50′36″N 17°14′29″E
- Country: Poland
- Voivodeship: Greater Poland
- County: Gostyń
- Gmina: Pogorzela

Taczanówko [tat͡ʂaˈnufkɔ] is a village in the administrative district of Gmina Pogorzela, within Gostyń County, Greater Poland Voivodeship, in west-central Poland.
