= Głuchówek, Greater Poland Voivodeship =

Głuchówek
- Village
- Location within Poland
- Coordinates: 51°48′N 17°16′E
- Country: Poland
- Voivodeship: Greater Poland
- County: Gostyń
- Gmina: Pogorzela

Głuchówek [ɡwuˈxuvɛk] is a village in the administrative district of Gmina Pogorzela, within Gostyń County, Greater Poland Voivodeship, in west-central Poland.
