= Międzyborze, Greater Poland Voivodeship =

Międzyborze
- Village
- Location within Poland
- Coordinates: 51°50′52″N 17°16′58″E
- Country: Poland
- Voivodeship: Greater Poland
- County: Gostyń
- Gmina: Pogorzela

Międzyborze [mjɛnd͡zɨˈbɔʐɛ] is a village in the administrative district of Gmina Pogorzela, within Gostyń County, Greater Poland Voivodeship, in west-central Poland.
