= Wygoda, Gostyń County =

Wygoda
- Village
- Location within Poland
- Coordinates: 51°53′4″N 17°12′1″E
- Country: Poland
- Voivodeship: Greater Poland
- County: Gostyń
- Gmina: Borek Wielkopolski

Wygoda [vɨˈɡɔda] is a village in the administrative district of Gmina Borek Wielkopolski, within Gostyń County, Greater Poland Voivodeship, in west-central Poland.
