= Małgów, Gostyń County =

Małgów
- Village
- Location within Poland
- Coordinates: 51°48′22″N 17°17′24″E
- Country: Poland
- Voivodeship: Greater Poland
- County: Gostyń
- Gmina: Pogorzela
- Population: 330

Małgów [ˈmau̯ɡuf] is a village in the administrative district of Gmina Pogorzela, within Gostyń County, Greater Poland Voivodeship, in west-central Poland.
