= Lipowiec, Greater Poland Voivodeship =

Lipowiec
- Village
- Location within Poland
- Coordinates: 51°49′N 17°27′E
- Country: Poland
- Voivodeship: Greater Poland
- County: Krotoszyn
- Gmina: Koźmin Wielkopolski

Lipowiec [liˈpɔvjɛt͡s] is a village in the administrative district of Gmina Koźmin Wielkopolski, within Krotoszyn County, Greater Poland Voivodeship, in west-central Poland.
