= Dzierżanów, Masovian Voivodeship =

Dzierżanów
- Village
- Location within Poland
- Coordinates: 52°27′40″N 21°36′42″E
- Country: Poland
- Voivodeship: Masovian
- County: Wołomin
- Gmina: Jadów

Dzierżanów [d͡ʑɛrˈʐanuf] is a village in the administrative district of Gmina Jadów, within Wołomin County, Masovian Voivodeship, in east-central Poland.
