= Długołęka, Greater Poland Voivodeship =

Długołęka
- Village
- Location within Poland
- Coordinates: 51°41′N 17°12′E
- Country: Poland
- Voivodeship: Greater Poland
- County: Krotoszyn
- Gmina: Kobylin

Długołęka (Polish pronunciation: [dwuɡɔˈwɛŋka]) is a village in the administrative district of Gmina Kobylin, within Krotoszyn County, Greater Poland Voivodeship, in west-central Poland.
