= Stawiszyn, Gostyń County =

Stawiszyn
- Settlement
- Location within Poland
- Coordinates: 51°57′54″N 17°12′51″E
- Country: Poland
- Voivodeship: Greater Poland
- County: Gostyń
- Gmina: Borek Wielkopolski

Stawiszyn [staˈviʂɨn] is a settlement in the administrative district of Gmina Borek Wielkopolski, within Gostyń County, Greater Poland Voivodeship, in west-central Poland.
