= Szelejewo =

- Village
- Location within Poland
- Coordinates: 52°44′N 17°45′E
- Country: Poland
- Voivodeship: Kuyavian-Pomeranian
- County: Żnin
- Gmina: Gąsawa
- Population: 378

Szelejewo [ʂɛlɛˈjɛvɔ] is a village in the administrative district of Gmina Gąsawa, within Żnin County, Kuyavian-Pomeranian Voivodeship, in north-central Poland.

== People ==
- Ferdinand von Kummer (1816–1900), Prussian general
