= Liz (surname) =

Liz is a surname. Notable people with the surname include:

- Adé Liz, Ivorian singer
- Gabriela Liz (born 1961), Argentine field hockey player
- Manuel Liz (born 1989), Portuguese footballer
- Radhames Liz (born 1983), Dominican baseball pitcher, formerly in Major League Baseball
- Víctor Liz (born 1986), Dominican basketball player
