= Mokronos, Greater Poland Voivodeship =

Mokronos
- Village
- Location within Poland
- Coordinates: 51°48′N 17°20′E
- Country: Poland
- Voivodeship: Greater Poland
- County: Krotoszyn
- Gmina: Koźmin Wielkopolski
- Population: 800

Mokronos [mɔˈkrɔnɔs] is a village in the administrative district of Gmina Koźmin Wielkopolski, within Krotoszyn County, Greater Poland Voivodeship, in west-central Poland.
