= Łagiewniki, Poznań County =

Łagiewniki
- Village
- Location within Poland
- Coordinates: 52°32′N 17°15′E
- Country: Poland
- Voivodeship: Greater Poland
- County: Poznań
- Gmina: Pobiedziska

Łagiewniki ([waɡʲɛvˈniki]; German: Lagiewnik) is a village in the administrative district of Gmina Pobiedziska, within Poznań County, Greater Poland Voivodeship, in west-central Poland.
