= Karlshof =

Karlshof may refer to:

- Karlshof concentration camp, Poland
- Biały Dwór, Lidzbark County, Poland
- Karolewo, Sępólno County, Poland
- Karlshof, Brandenburg, Germany
- Karlshof (Westerstede), a village in Westerstede, Lower Saxony, Germany
- Salesianum Zug (St. Karlshof), Switzerland
