= Wrotków, Greater Poland Voivodeship =

Wrotków
- Village
- Location within Poland
- Coordinates: 51°49′13″N 17°23′5″E
- Country: Poland
- Voivodeship: Greater Poland
- County: Krotoszyn
- Gmina: Koźmin Wielkopolski

Wrotków [ˈvrɔtkuf] is a village in the administrative district of Gmina Koźmin Wielkopolski, within Krotoszyn County, Greater Poland Voivodeship, in west-central Poland.
