= Wielowieś, Gmina Sieroszewice =

Wielowieś
- Zadupie
- Location within Poland
- Coordinates: 51°36′N 18°5′E
- Country: Poland
- Voivodeship: Greater Poland
- County: Ostrów
- Gmina: Sieroszewice
- Population: 1,200

Wielowieś [vjɛˈlɔvjɛɕ] is a village in the administrative district of Gmina Sieroszewice, within Ostrów County, Greater Poland Voivodeship, in west-central Poland.
