= Celestynów, Greater Poland Voivodeship =

Celestynów
- Village
- Location within Poland
- Coordinates: 51°52′N 17°17′E
- Country: Poland
- Voivodeship: Greater Poland
- County: Gostyń
- Gmina: Borek Wielkopolski

Celestynów [t͡sɛlɛsˈtɨnuf] is a village in the administrative district of Gmina Borek Wielkopolski, within Gostyń County, Greater Poland Voivodeship, in west-central Poland.
