= Berdychów =

- Village
- Location within Poland
- Coordinates: 51°44′4″N 17°14′45″E
- Country: Poland
- Voivodeship: Greater Poland
- County: Krotoszyn
- Gmina: Kobylin

Berdychów [bɛrˈdɨxuf] is a village in the administrative district of Gmina Kobylin, within Krotoszyn County, Greater Poland Voivodeship, in west-central Poland.
