= Starygród =

- Village
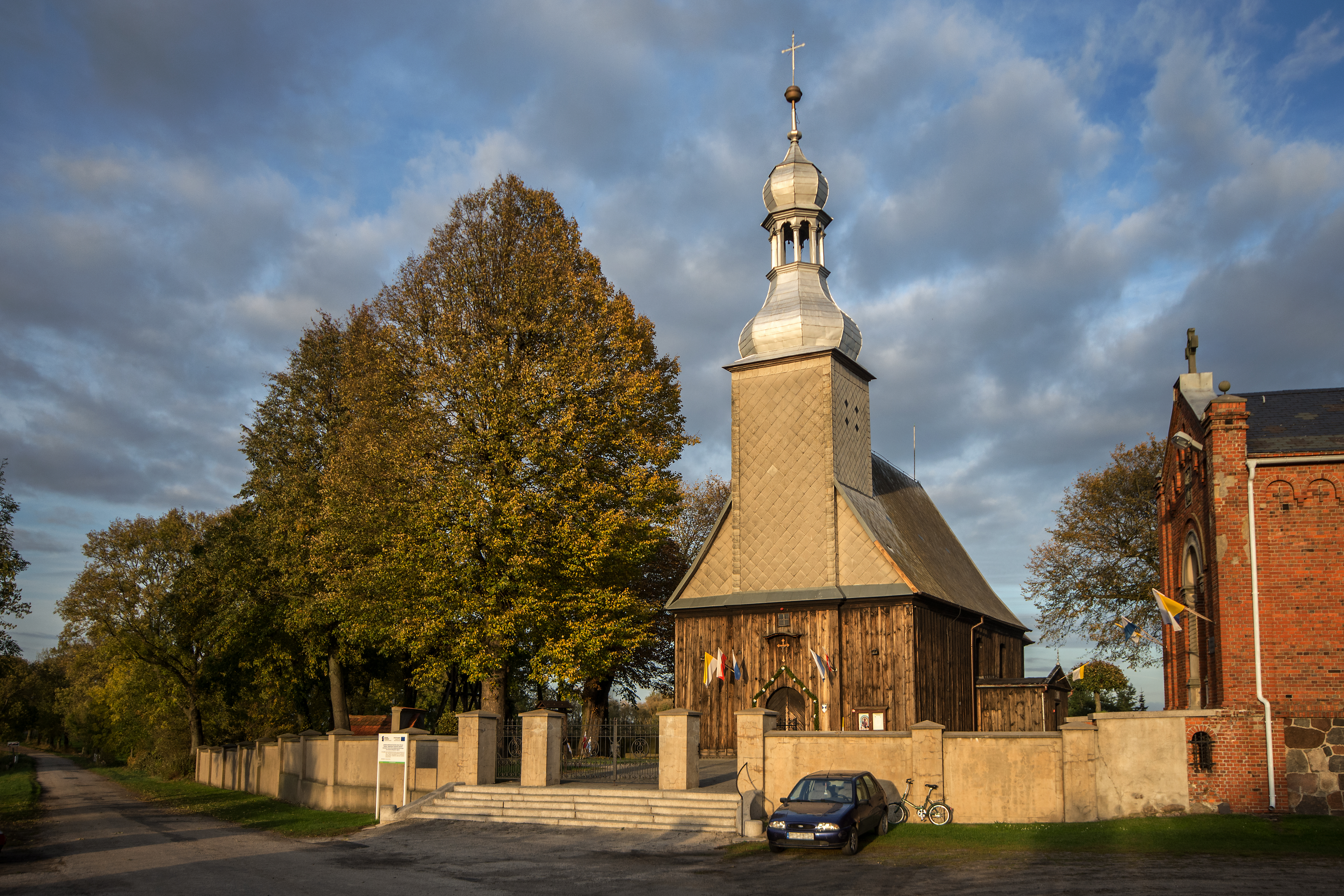

- Location within Poland
- Coordinates: 51°44′30″N 17°21′01″E
- Country: Poland
- Voivodeship: Greater Poland
- County: Krotoszyn
- Gmina: Kobylin
- Population: 260

Starygród [staˈrɨɡrut] is a village in the administrative district of Gmina Kobylin, within Krotoszyn County, Greater Poland Voivodeship, in west-central Poland.
