= Obra, Greater Poland Voivodeship =

Obra
- Village
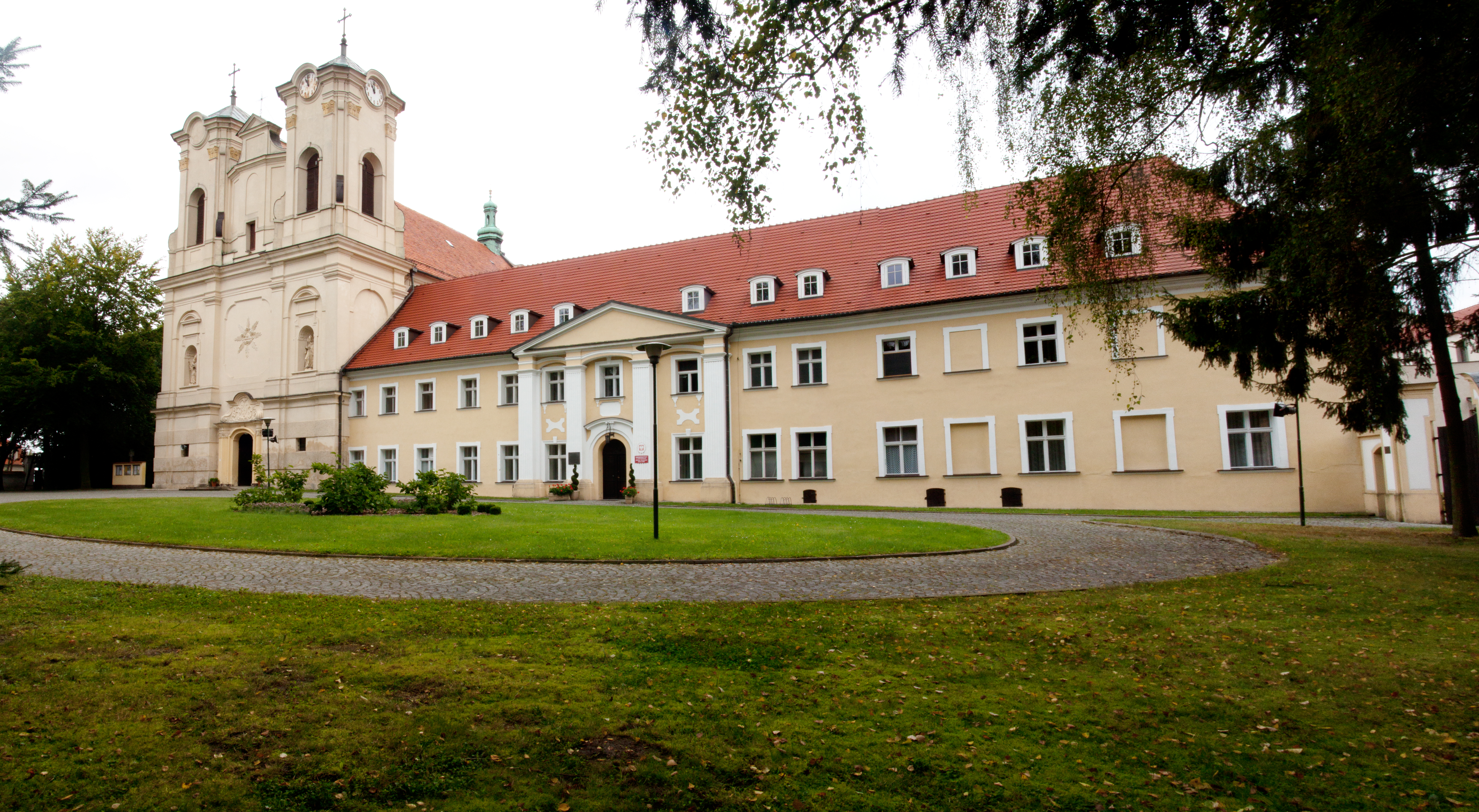
- Obra Abbey

- Location within Poland
- Coordinates: 52°5′N 16°3′E
- Country: Poland
- Voivodeship: Greater Poland
- County: Wolsztyn
- Gmina: Wolsztyn
- Population: 2,059
- Time zone: UTC+1 (CET)
  - Summer (DST): UTC+2 (CEST)
- Vehicle registration: PWL

Obra [ˈɔbra] is a village in the administrative district of Gmina Wolsztyn, within Wolsztyn County, Greater Poland Voivodeship, in west-central Poland.

The landmark of Obra is the former Cistercian Abbey with the Baroque Church of Saint James.

== Transport ==
Obra lies on vovoideship road 315.

The nearest railway station is in Wolsztyn.
