= Kromolice, Gostyń County =

Kromolice
- Village
- Location within Poland
- Coordinates: 51°46′3″N 17°17′19″E
- Country: Poland
- Voivodeship: Greater Poland
- County: Gostyń
- Gmina: Pogorzela
- Population: 520

Kromolice [krɔmɔˈlit͡sɛ] is a village in the administrative district of Gmina Pogorzela, within Gostyń County, Greater Poland Voivodeship, in west-central Poland.
