= Kaczagórka =

- Village
- Location within Poland
- Coordinates: 51°50′N 17°20′E
- Country: Poland
- Voivodeship: Greater Poland
- County: Gostyń
- Gmina: Pogorzela

Kaczagórka [kat͡ʂaˈɡurka] is a village in the administrative district of Gmina Pogorzela, within Gostyń County, Greater Poland Voivodeship, in west-central Poland.
