= Borek Wielkopolski =

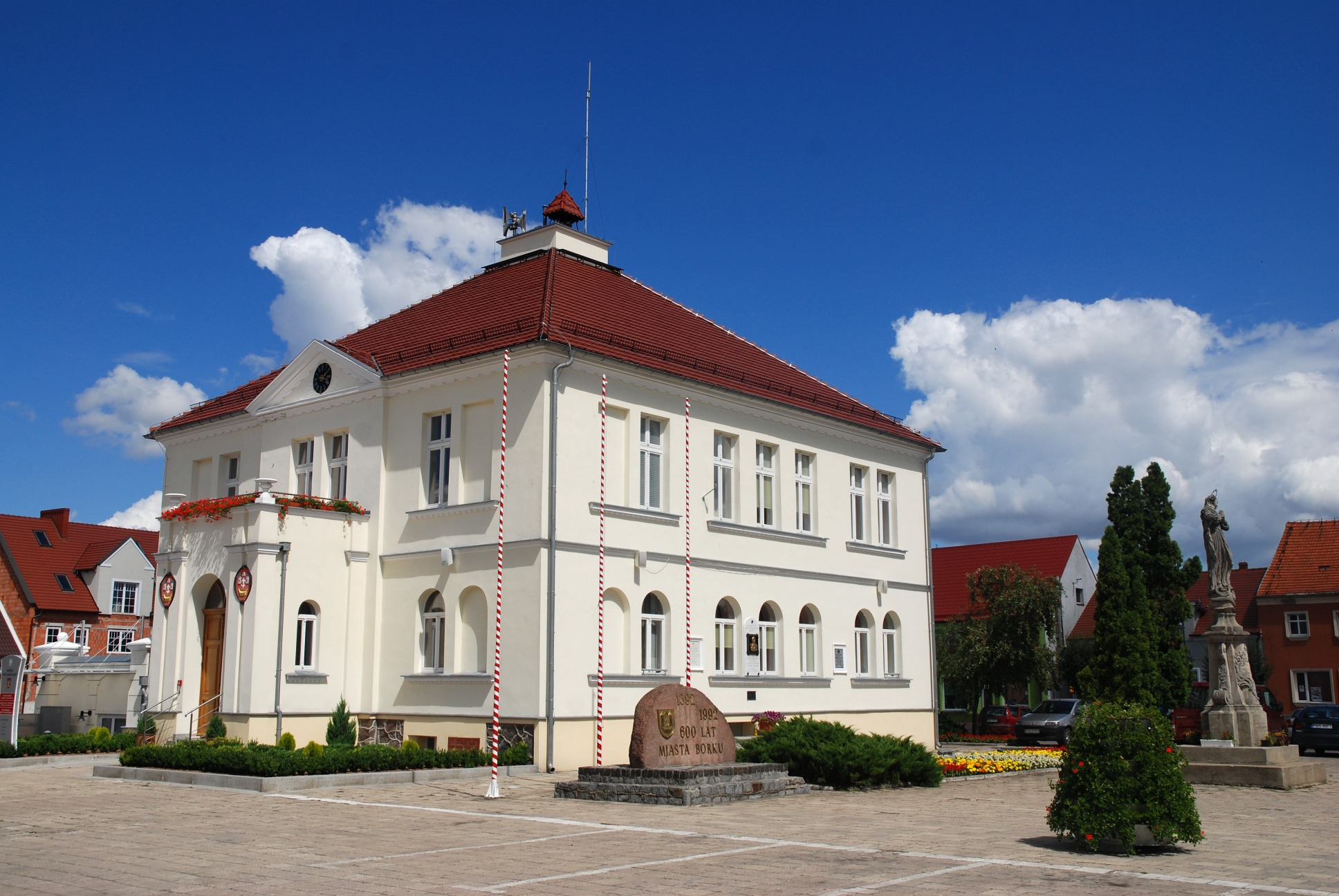
- Town Hall

- Flag Coat of arms

- Location within Poland
- Coordinates: 51°55′N 17°15′E
- Country: Poland
- Voivodeship: Greater Poland
- County: Gostyń
- Gmina: Borek Wielkopolski
- Town rights: 1392

Government
  - Mayor: Janusz Sikora

Area
  - Total: 6.16 km^{2} (2.38 sq mi)

Population (30 June 2021)
  - Total: 2,485
  - Density: 403/km^{2} (1,040/sq mi)
- Time zone: UTC+1 (CET)
  - Summer (DST): UTC+2 (CEST)
- Postal code: 63-810
- Area code: +48 65
- Vehicle registration: PGS
- Website: http://www.borekwlkp.pl/

Borek Wielkopolski [ˈbɔrɛk vʲɛlkɔˈpɔlskʲi] is a town in Poland, in the Gostyń County in the Greater Poland Voivodeship, with 2,485 inhabitants as of June 2021.

== History ==
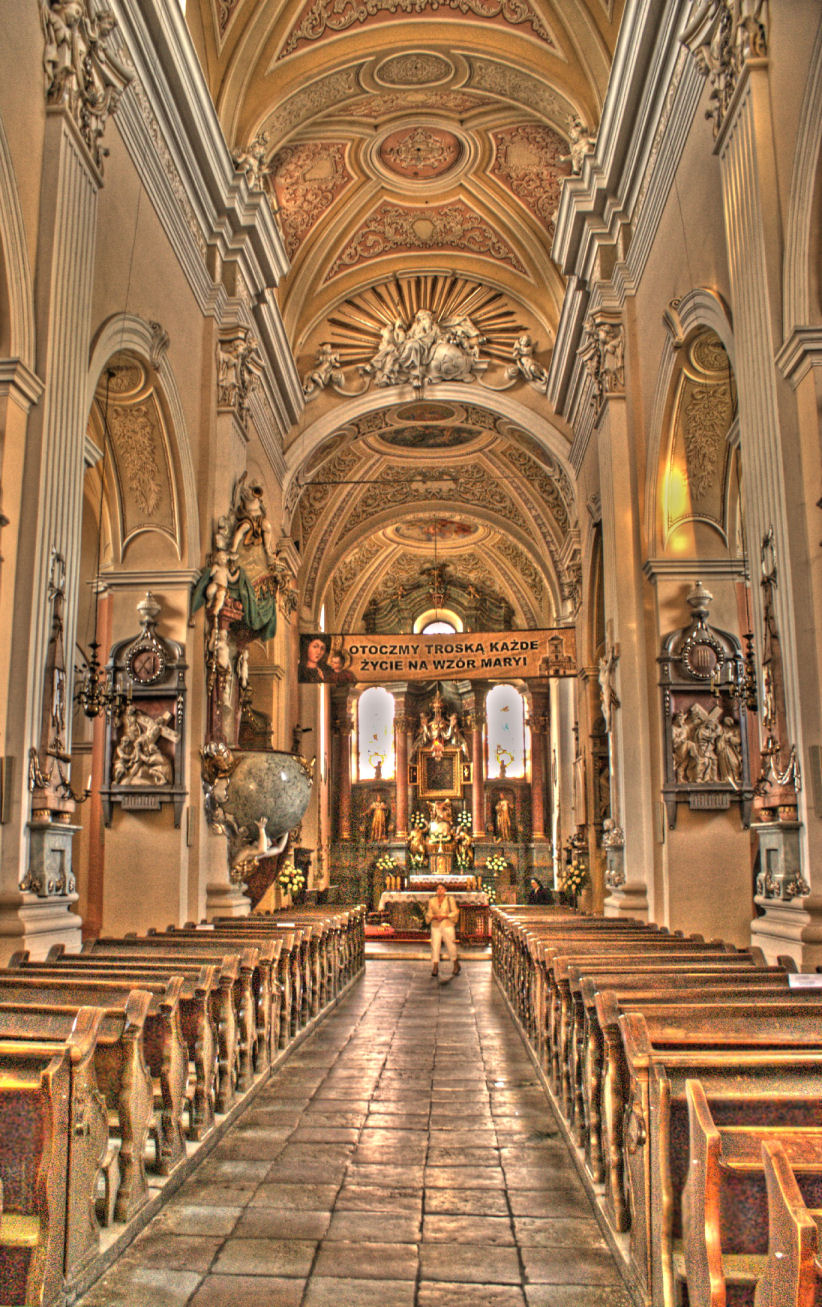
Interior of Church of St. Mary

Borek was granted town rights in 1392 by Polish King Władysław II Jagiełło. It was a private town, administratively located in the Pyzdry County in the Kalisz Voivodeship in the Greater Poland Province of the Kingdom of Poland.

Following the joint German-Soviet invasion of Poland, which started World War II in September 1939, the village was occupied by Germany until 1945. The occupiers operated a forced labour camp for Jews in the town.

From 1975 to 1998 it was a part of Leszno Voivodeship.

== Transport ==
Borek Wielkopolski lies on voivodeship road 438.

The nearest railway station is in Jarocin.

== Demographics ==
Historical population

Year	Pop.	±%
1811	1,086	—
1837	1,750	+61.1%
1843	1,812	+3.5%
1871	2,020	+11.5%
1880	2,081	+3.0%
1890	2,023	−2.8%
1900	1,986	−1.8%

Year	Pop.	±%
1910	2,237	+12.6%
1921	2,097	−6.3%
1931	2,052	−2.1%
1939	2,280	+11.1%
1950	1,716	−24.7%
1960	1,840	+7.2%
2010	2,532	+37.6%
