= Gościejewo, Greater Poland Voivodeship =

Gościejewo
- Village
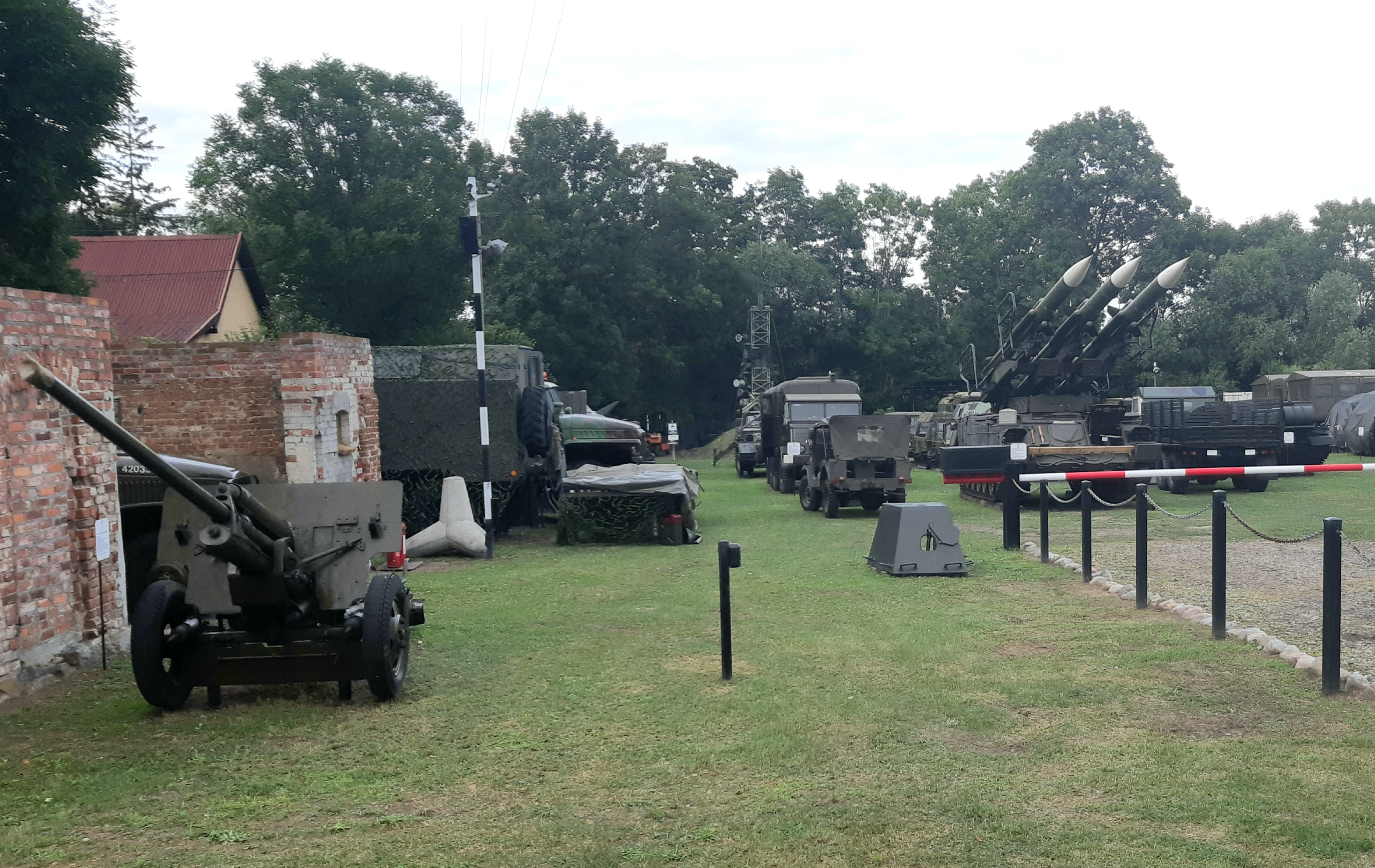
- Military vehicles exhibition

- Location within Poland
- Coordinates: 52°47′N 16°57′E
- Country: Poland
- Voivodeship: Greater Poland
- County: Oborniki
- Gmina: Rogoźno

Gościejewo (Polish pronunciation: [ɡɔɕt͡ɕɛˈjɛvɔ]) is a village in the administrative district of Gmina Rogoźno, within Oborniki County, Greater Poland Voivodeship, in west-central Poland.
