= Liż =

- Settlement
- Location within Poland
- Coordinates: 51°57′41″N 17°11′38″E
- Country: Poland
- Voivodeship: Greater Poland
- County: Gostyń
- Gmina: Borek Wielkopolski

Liż [liʂ] is a settlement in the administrative district of Gmina Borek Wielkopolski, within Gostyń County, Greater Poland Voivodeship, in west-central Poland.
