= Bruczków =

- Village
- Location within Poland
- Coordinates: 51°55′N 17°17′E
- Country: Poland
- Voivodeship: Greater Poland
- County: Gostyń
- Gmina: Borek Wielkopolski
- Website: https://web.archive.org/web/20090220054145/http://bruczkow.republika.pl/

Bruczków [ˈbrut͡ʂkuf] is a village in the administrative district of Gmina Borek Wielkopolski, within Gostyń County, Greater Poland Voivodeship, in west-central Poland.
