= Głoginin =

- Village
- Location within Poland
- Coordinates: 51°52′18″N 17°18′13″E
- Country: Poland
- Voivodeship: Greater Poland
- County: Gostyń
- Gmina: Borek Wielkopolski
- Population: 270

Głoginin [ɡwɔˈɡinin] is a village in the administrative district of Gmina Borek Wielkopolski, within Gostyń County, Greater Poland Voivodeship, in west-central Poland.
