= Koźmin Wielkopolski =

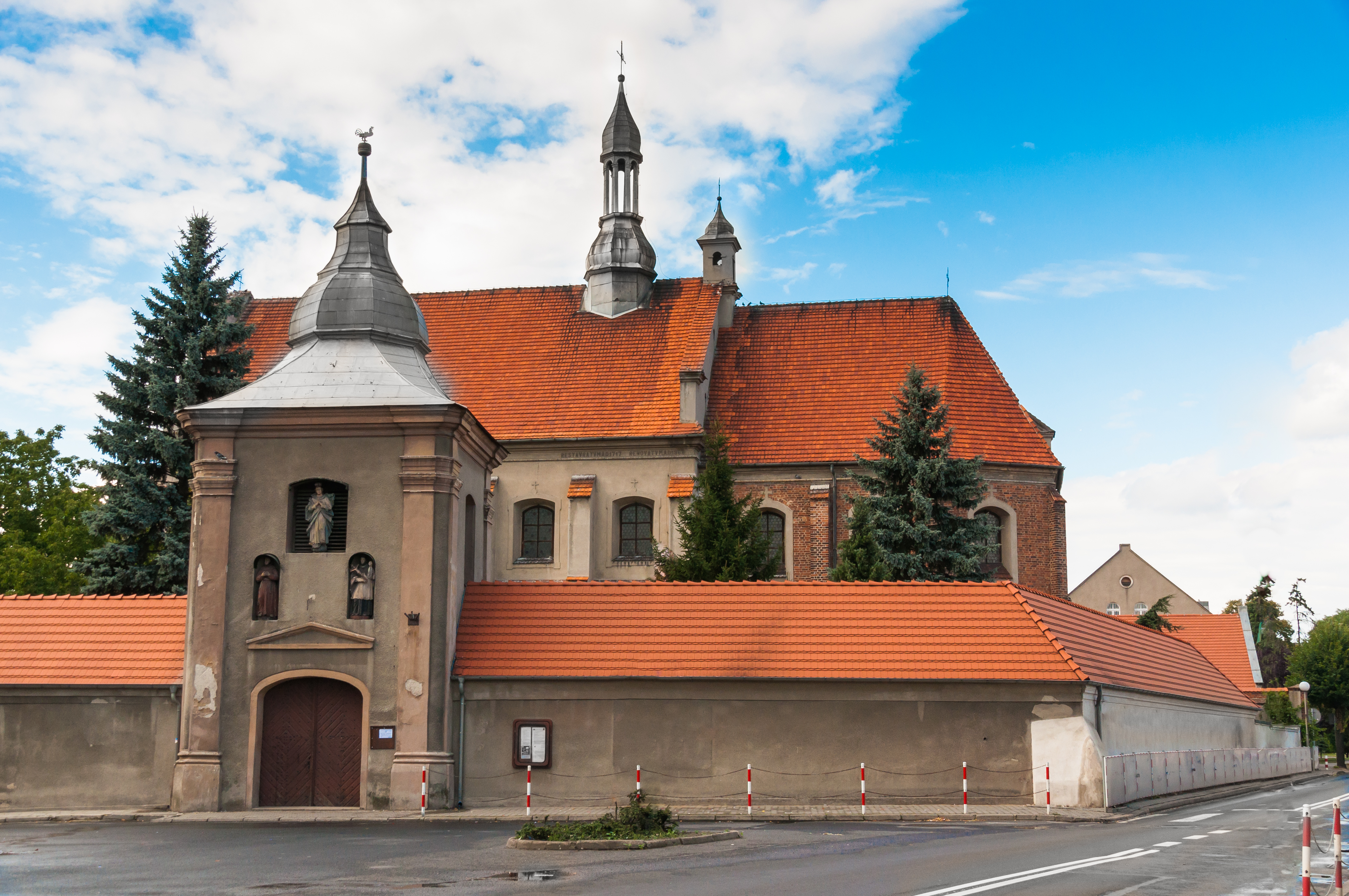
- Church of Saint Stanislaus

- Flag Coat of arms

- Location within Poland
- Coordinates: 51°49′26″N 17°27′19″E
- Country: Poland
- Voivodeship: Greater Poland
- County: Krotoszyn
- Gmina: Koźmin Wielkopolski
- First mentioned: 1232
- Town rights: ca. 1251-1283

Area
  - Total: 5.86 km^{2} (2.26 sq mi)

Population (2010)
  - Total: 6,678
  - Density: 1,140/km^{2} (2,950/sq mi)
- Time zone: UTC+1 (CET)
  - Summer (DST): UTC+2 (CEST)
- Postal code: 63-720
- Climate: Cfb
- Website: http://www.kozminwlkp.pl/

Koźmin Wielkopolski ([ˈkɔʑmʲin vʲɛlkɔˈpɔlskʲi]) is a town in Krotoszyn County, Greater Poland Voivodeship, Poland, with 6,678 inhabitants according to the 2010 census. It is the seat of the Koźmin Wielkopolski urban-rural gmina, which has a population of 13,739 people as of 2010. Until January 1, 1997, the town's official name was "Koźmin"; "Wielkopolski" was then added to the name.

== History ==
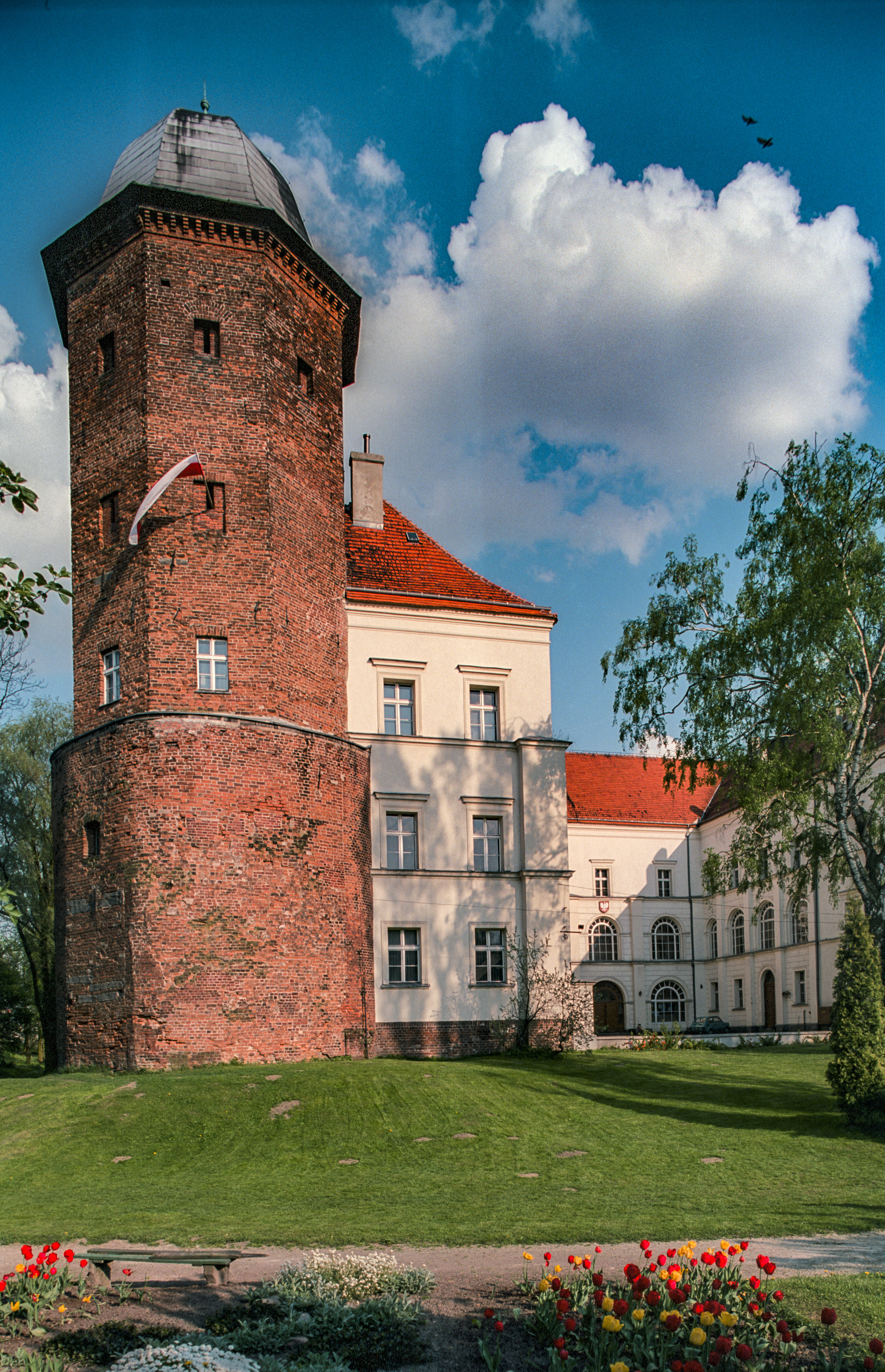
Koźmin Wielkopolski Castle, now a museum

A medieval Polish settlement existed at the site as early as the 12th century. The oldest known mention of Koźmin comes from 1232, it was a village owned by the Knights Templar. It was granted town rights between 1251 and 1283. In 1338, King Casimir III the Great gave the town to Maćko Borowiec, who built a castle there. The castle, located along present-day Zamkowa Street, is still in use today; it houses a school and the Muzeum Ziemi Koźminskiej (Museum of the Koźmin Land).

Koźmin was a private town located in the Pyzdry County in the Kalisz Voivodeship in the Greater Poland Province of the Kingdom of Poland. The town changed owners several times; it was the property of the Górkas, a prominent Greater Poland family, in the 16th century, and later belonged to the Sapieha family. It was considered one of the most powerful towns in Greater Poland in the 15th and 16th century. Koźmin prospered through trade and crafts. In the 17th century it was a local Reformation center.

After the Second Partition of Poland, in 1793, it was annexed by Prussia. Regained by Poles after the successful Greater Poland uprising of 1806, it was included in the short-lived Polish Duchy of Warsaw, in 1815 it was re-annexed by Prussia. The Poles took part both in the unsuccessful Greater Poland uprising of 1848 and the victorious Greater Poland uprising of 1918–1919, after which Kobylin was integrated with Poland, shortly after it regained independence.

During World War II, Koźmin Wielkopolski was under German occupation from 6 September 1939 to 23 January 1945. In 1939–1940, the German gendarmerie carried out expulsions of Poles, who were deported to the General Government in the more-eastern part of German-occupied Poland, while their houses, shops and workshops were handed over to German colonists as part of the Lebensraum policy. The occupiers operated a Nazi prison for women in the town. The Polish resistance was active in Koźmin. The Orły ("Eagles") Polish underground newspaper was printed in Koźmin, and distributed in Koźmin and other nearby towns. Janusz Podlewski, commander of the local unit of the Home Army, was arrested by the Gestapo in July 1944, and then imprisoned in various prisons and the Mauthausen concentration camp, where he was liberated by American troops.

One of the best-preserved Jewish cemeteries in Greater Poland is located in Koźmin Wielkopolski, along Wierzbowa Street. It includes more than 250 graves, dating back as far as 1806. The cemetery is maintained by a local teacher, Jerzy Fornalik, who is also the author of a multicultural education program, "Anty-Schematy," for students from Poland, Israel, Germany, and other countries.

A former women's prison from World War II, which housed female political prisoners under the Nazi occupation, is located along present-day Klasztorna Street. Currently a youth education center is located in the building. Some of the prisoners are buried in a mass grave, commemorated by a monument, in the cemetery along Poznańska Street.

== Demographics ==
Historical population

Year	Pop.	±%
1811	2,039	—
1837	3,439	+68.7%
1843	3,406	−1.0%
1871	3,595	+5.5%
1880	4,183	+16.4%
1890	4,358	+4.2%
1900	4,651	+6.7%

Year	Pop.	±%
1910	5,091	+9.5%
1921	4,999	−1.8%
1931	5,450	+9.0%
1939	5,650	+3.7%
1950	5,396	−4.5%
1960	5,890	+9.2%
2010	6,678	+13.4%

== Transport ==
National Road 15 used to pass right through Koźmin Wielkopolski. On Friday 19th December 2025 a new bypass was opened which diverted national road 15 to the east of the town. National Road 15 links Jarocin to Trzebnica.

Koźmin Wielkopolski has a station on the railway line between Jarocin and Krotoszyn. Regional trains provide services to both of these towns.

Buses on Line J operate between Koźmin Wielkopolski / Jarocin / Krotoszyn

== Gallery ==
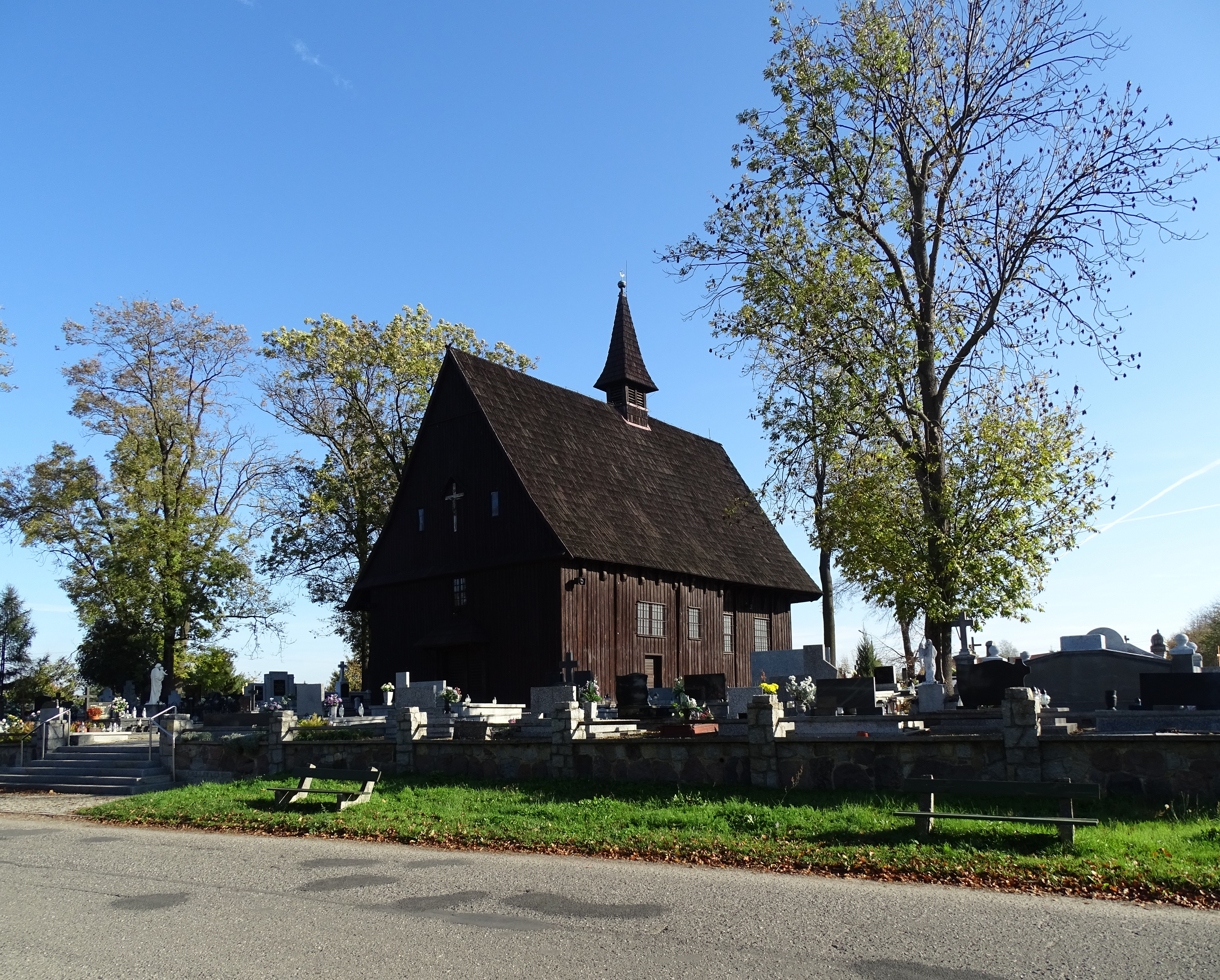
Holy Cross church

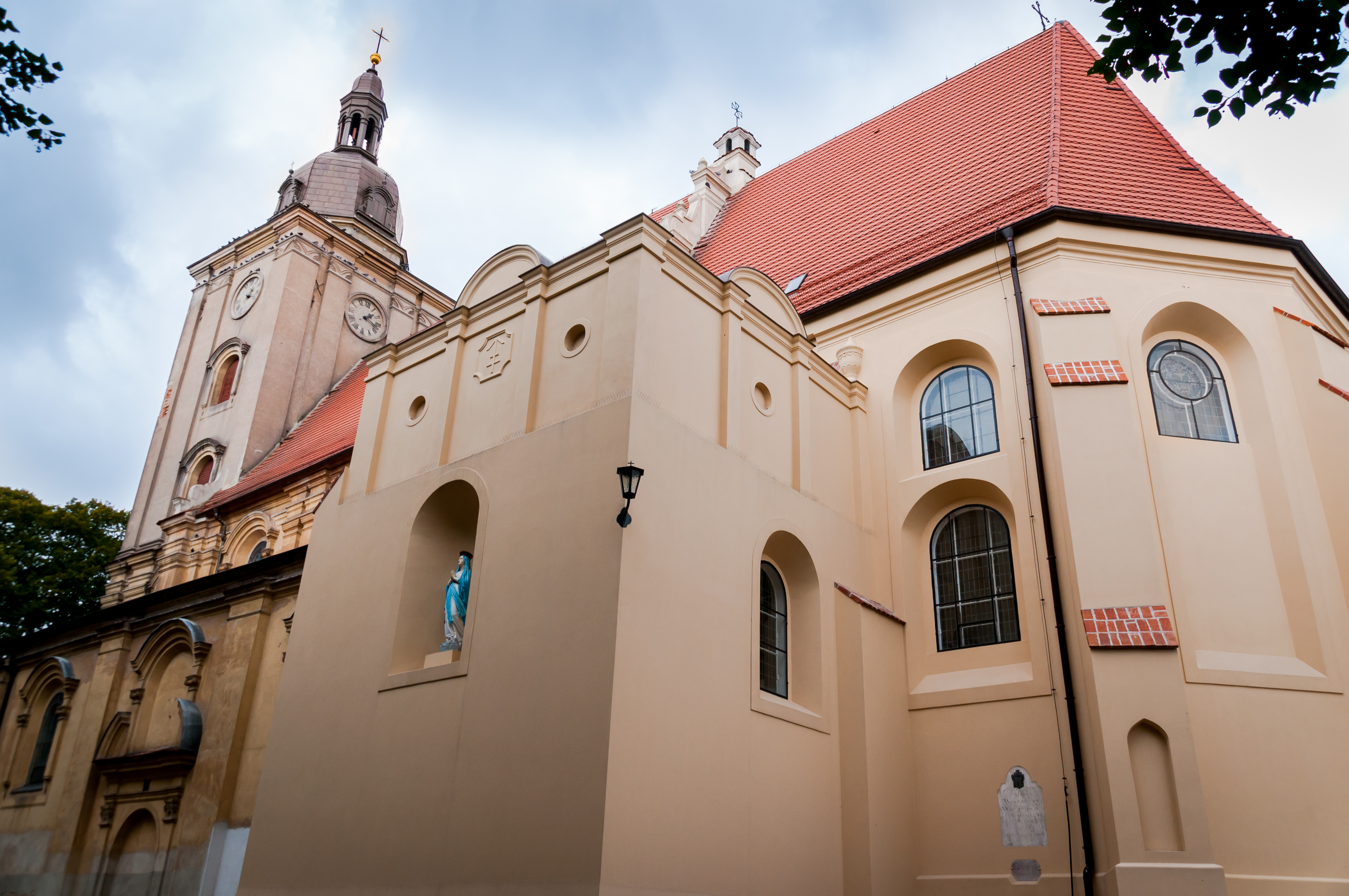
Saint Lawrence church

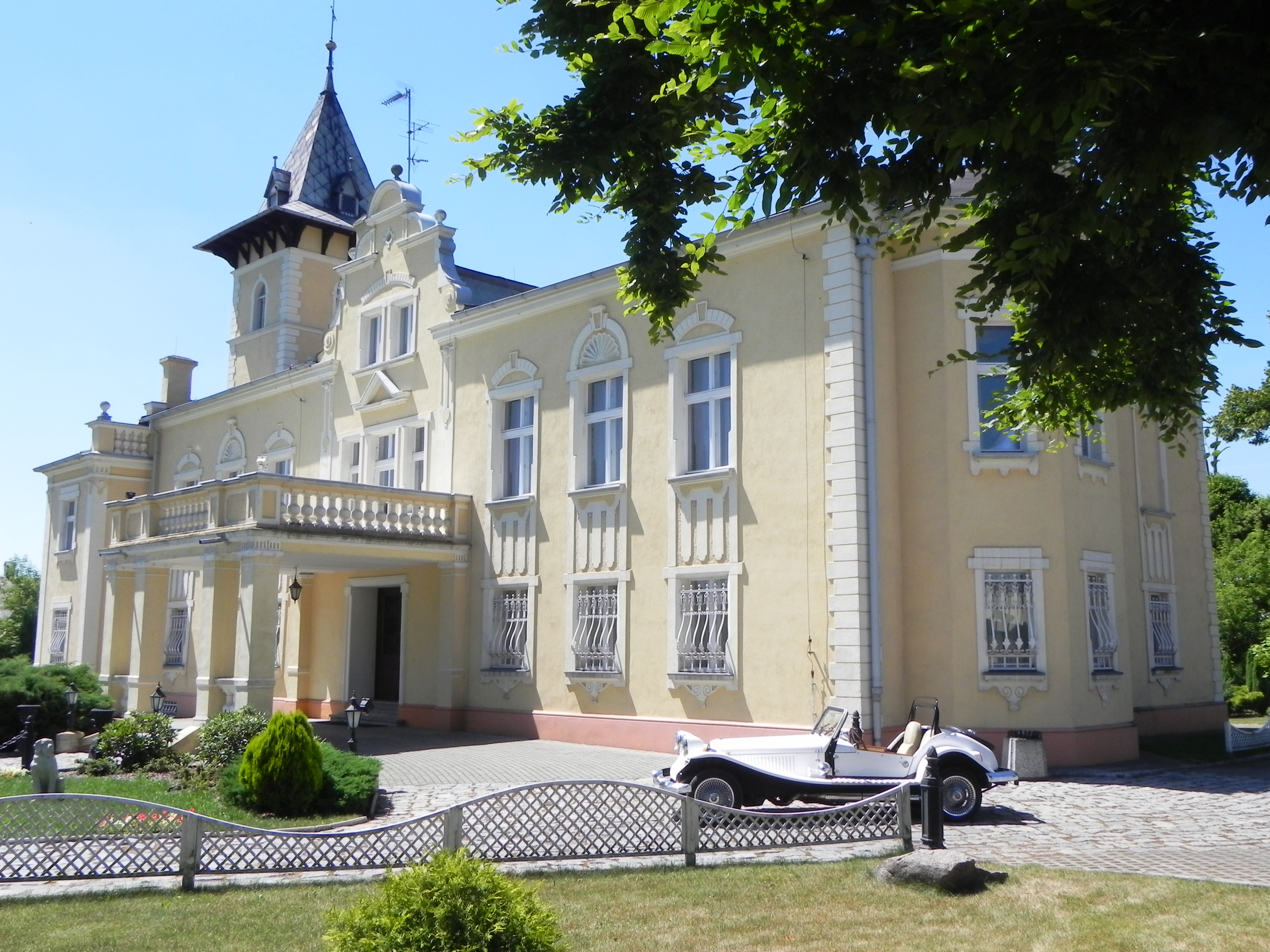
Palace

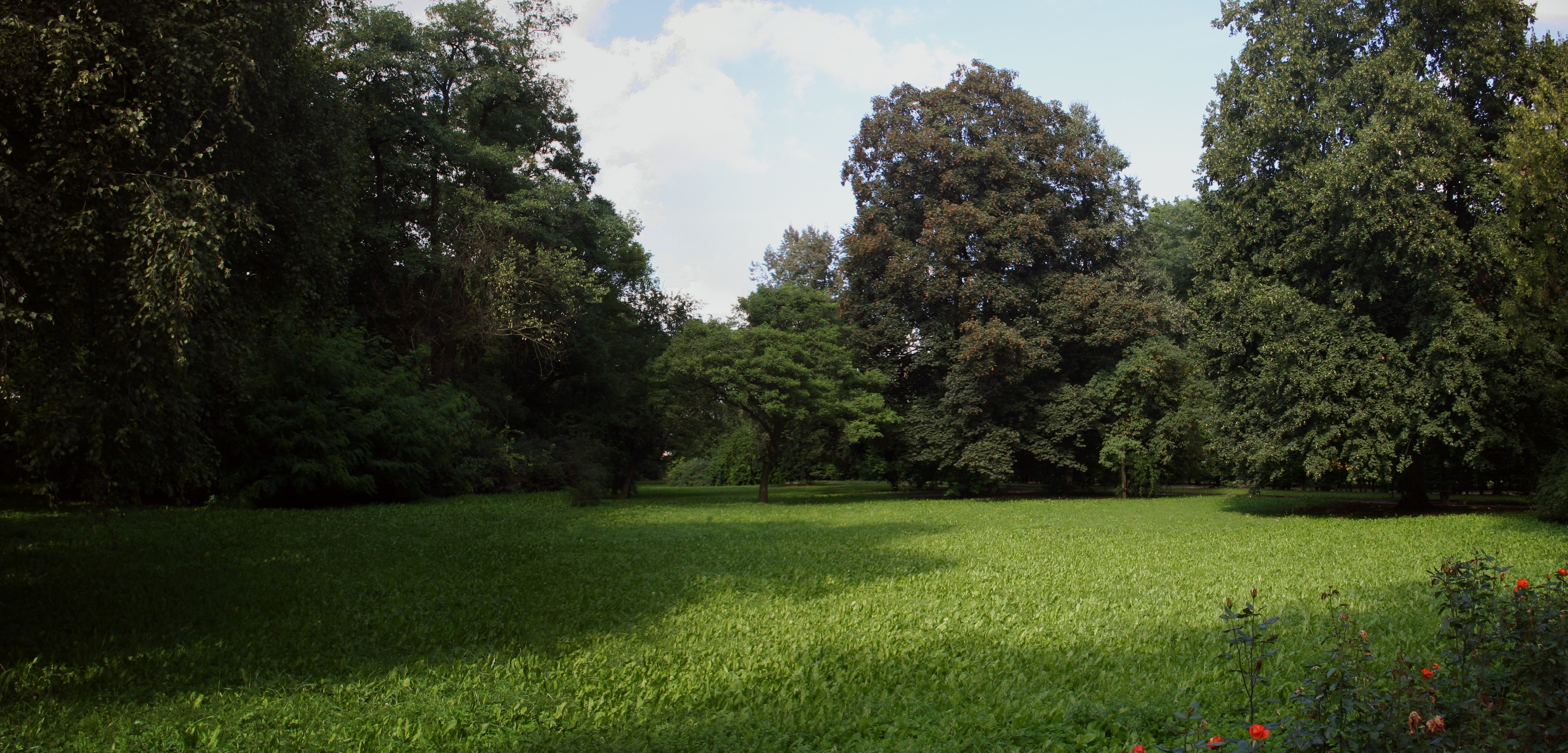
Municipal Park

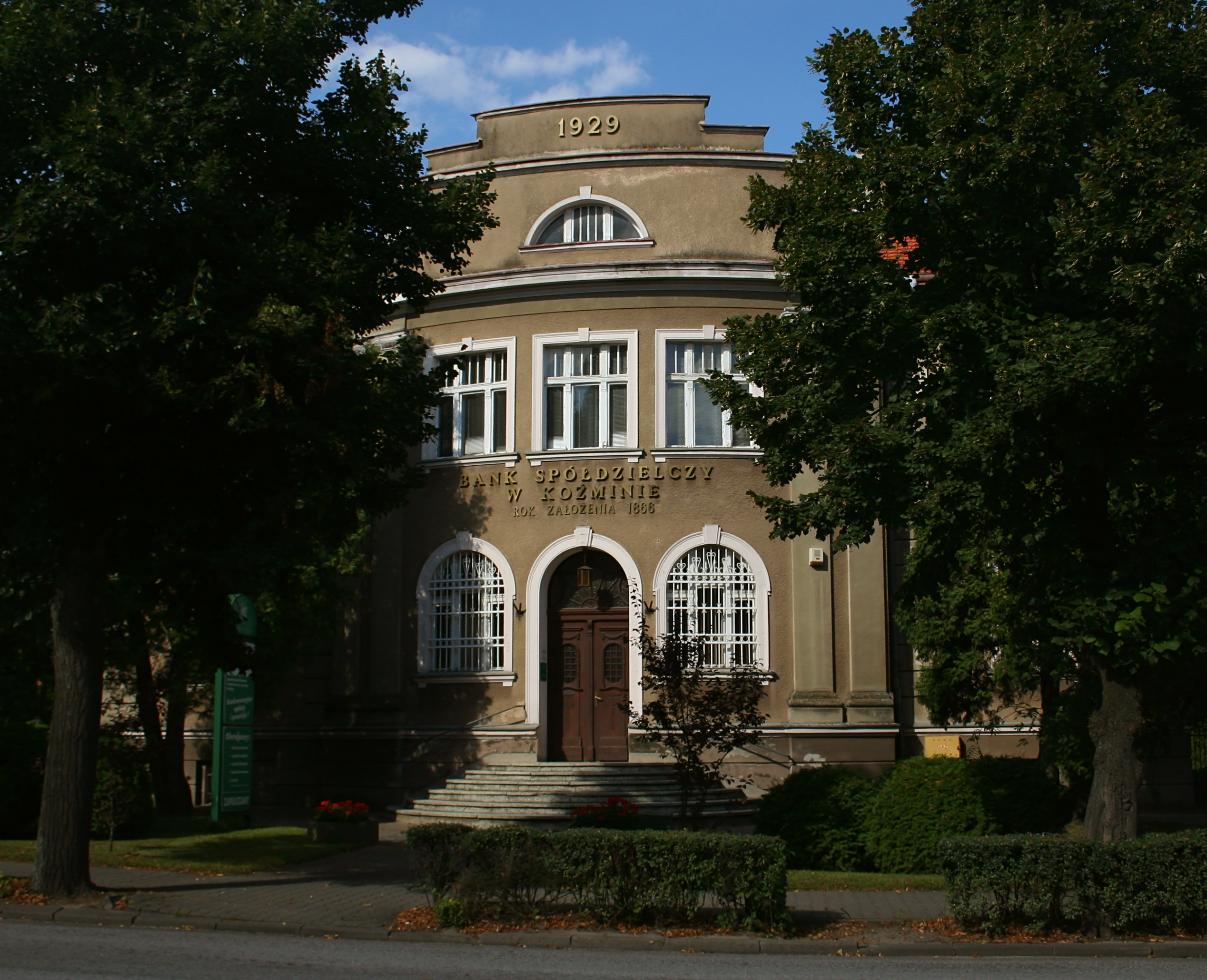
Historic bank building

== People ==
- Stanislaus von Kalckreuth (1820-1894), German painter
