= Richard Friedrich Johannes Pfeiffer =

German physician and bacteriologist

Richard Pfeiffer
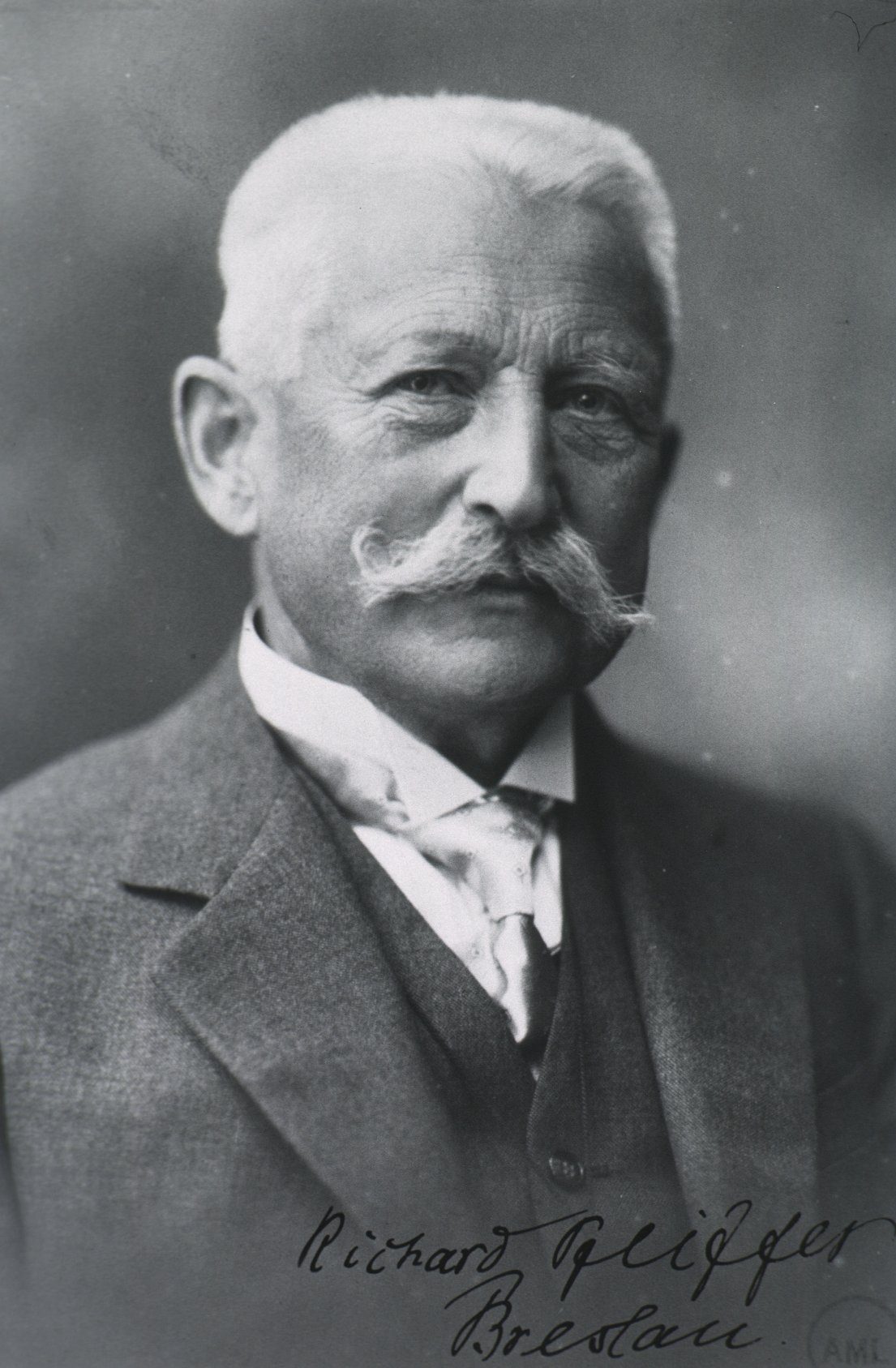
- c. 1928
- Born: 27 March 1858; Treustädt (Prussia, now Greater Poland Voivodeship, Poland)
- Died: 15 September 1945 (aged 87); Bad Landek (Prussia, now Lower Silesian Voivodeship, southwestern Poland)
- Citizenship: German
- Known for: Discovery of Endotoxins, Haemophilus influenzae, Typhoid vaccine, Micrococcus catarrhalis, staining histological preparations.
- Awards: Kussmaul medal (1918), Pasteur medal (1918), Ludwig-Darmstädter prize (1926),Fellow of the Royal Society
- Scientific career
- Fields: Microbiology

Richard Friedrich Johannes Pfeiffer FRS (27 March 1858 – 15 September 1945) was a German physician and bacteriologist. Pfeiffer is remembered for his many fundamental discoveries in immunology and bacteriology, particularly for the discovery of endotoxins and the formulation of a vaccine for typhoid fever.

== Early life ==
Pfeiffer was born on March 27th, 1858 to Otto Pfeiffer, a German pastor of the local Evangelical parish, and Natalia née Jüttner, in Treustädt, Province of Posen (Prussia) in what is today the Polish district of Krotoszyn.

After completing his education at the gymnasium in Świdnica, Pfeiffer studied medicine at the Kaiser Wilhelms Akademie in Berlin from 1875 to 1879. After completing his studies he was conferred doctor of medicine in 1880. He worked as a military surgeon in Wiesbaden. From there he was commissioned as captain of the Medical Corps to a little garrison in Dieuze, which was then part of occupied Alsace-Lorraine serving as an army physician and bacteriologist until 1889. He was a student of Robert Koch (1843–1910), and from 1887 to 1891 worked as Koch's assistant in the Institute of Hygiene in Berlin. In 1891, he was entrusted with the leadership of the scientific department of the Institute of Infectious Diseases in Berlin.

Pfeiffer began his medical studies in the former Kaiser Wilhelm Academy for military medical education. Graduating and gaining his medical registration in 1880.

== Career ==
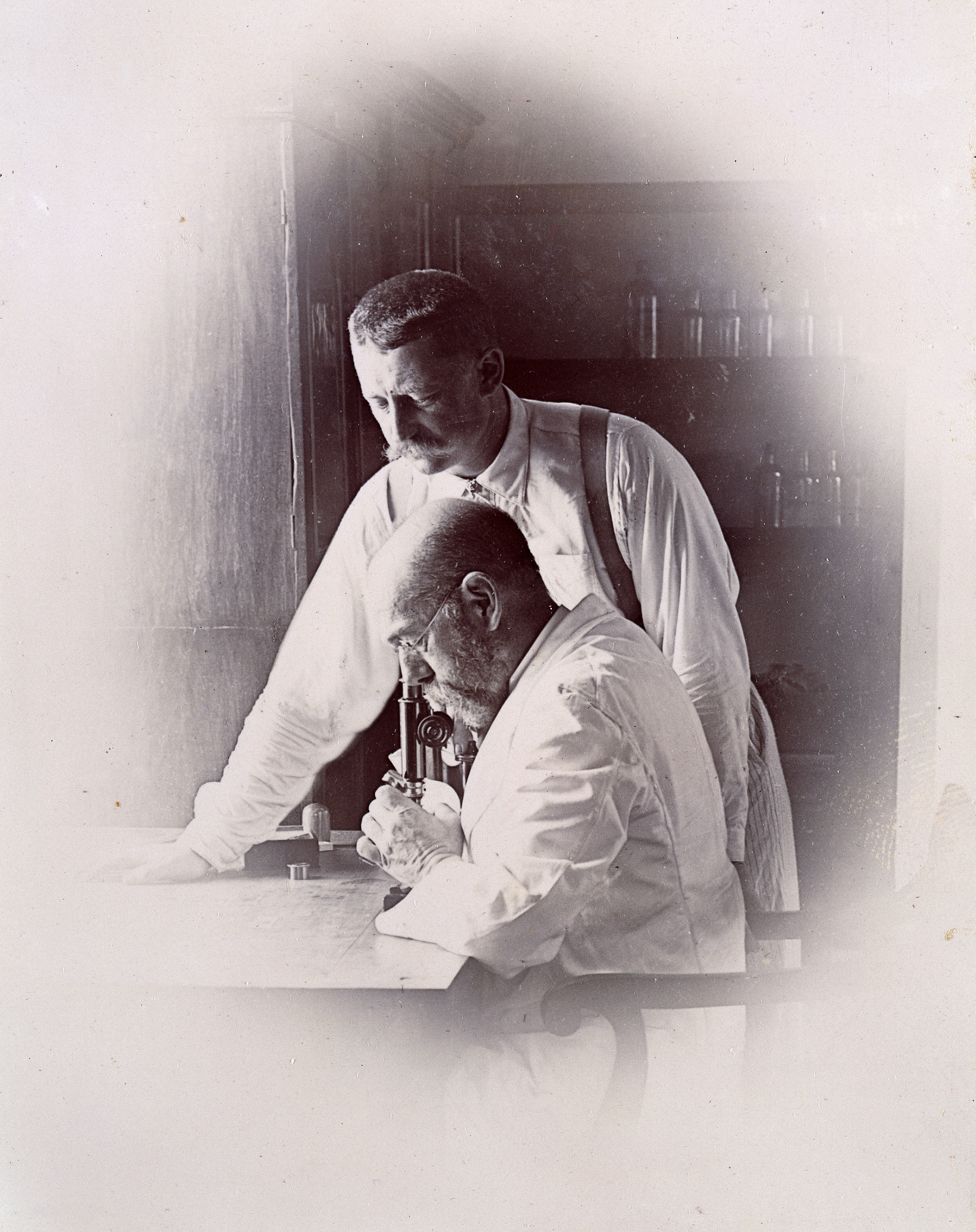
Robert Koch and Richard Pfeiffer working in the laboratory (1897)

Eight weeks after joining the Medical Corp in 1891, Pfeiffer was detached to Robert Koch’s laboratory at the Institute for Hygiene in Berlin. Pfeiffer was soon appointed managing director of the scientific section by Koch.

In 1892, Pfeiffer isolated what he thought was the causative agent of influenza. The culprit, according to Pfeiffer, was a small rod-shaped bacterium that he isolated from the noses of flu-infected patients. He dubbed it "Bacillus influenzae" (or Pfeiffer's bacillus), which was later called Haemophilus influenzae.

In 1894 Pfeiffer found that live cholera bacteria could be injected into guinea pigs previously immunised against cholera without ill effects. Additionally that blood plasma from these animals added to live cholera bacteria caused the bacteria to become motionless and lyse. This effect could be inhibited by heating the blood plasma prior to adding to the cholera vibrios. He called this bacteriolysis and it became known as the Pfeiffer Phenomenon (or Isayev-Pfeiffer phenomenon) which is now recognized as complement-mediated bacteriolysis.

In 1896, Pfeiffer isolated Micrococcus catarrhalis that is the cause of laryngitis. M. catarrhalis also causes bronchitis, and pneumonia in children and adults with underlying chronic lung disease. It is occasionally a cause of meningitis.

In 1897, Pfeiffer was a member of the plague commission sent to India by the German Reich. For hazardous duty, he received the third-class Order of the Crown at the level of the combatant’s ribbon. After being injured by a bursting flask, Pfeiffer was infected with bubonic plague and fell ill.

In 1899, Pfeiffer was appointed to the chair of Hygiene in Königsberg.

Working with Robert Koch in Berlin he intellectually and experimentally conceived the concept of endotoxin as a heat-stable bacterial poison responsible for the pathophysiological consequences of certain infectious diseases. Endotoxin and anti-endotoxin antibodies have since then fascinated researchers of many disciplines, particularly in the fields of diagnosis, prevention, and therapy of severe Gram-negative infections.

Pfeiffer was a pioneer in typhoid vaccination. He discovered the specific bacteria-dissolving immune bodies in cholera and typhus. The British pathologist Almroth Wright is generally credited with the initiation of typhoid vaccination in 1896. His claims of priority were challenged as early as 1907 in favour of Richard Pfeiffer. A review of the original literature of the 1890s and the early 1900s revealed that several groups were working on typhoid vaccine at the same time and that the credit for the initiation of typhoid vaccine studies should be shared by these two great researchers.

In 1897, Pfeiffer joined the German expedition under Robert Koch to India to investigate the plague. The following year he went to Italy with Koch to do research on malaria.

Richard Pfeiffer also invented a universal staining for histological preparations.

He moved to Königsberg to enter the chair of hygiene in 1899, succeeding Erwin von Esmarch (1855–1915). He remained in that city until 1909, when he moved on to the same chair in Breslau. Pfeiffer retired there as emeritus in 1925.

Pfeiffer died on 15 September 1945 in Bad Landeck (Prussia, which is now Poland).

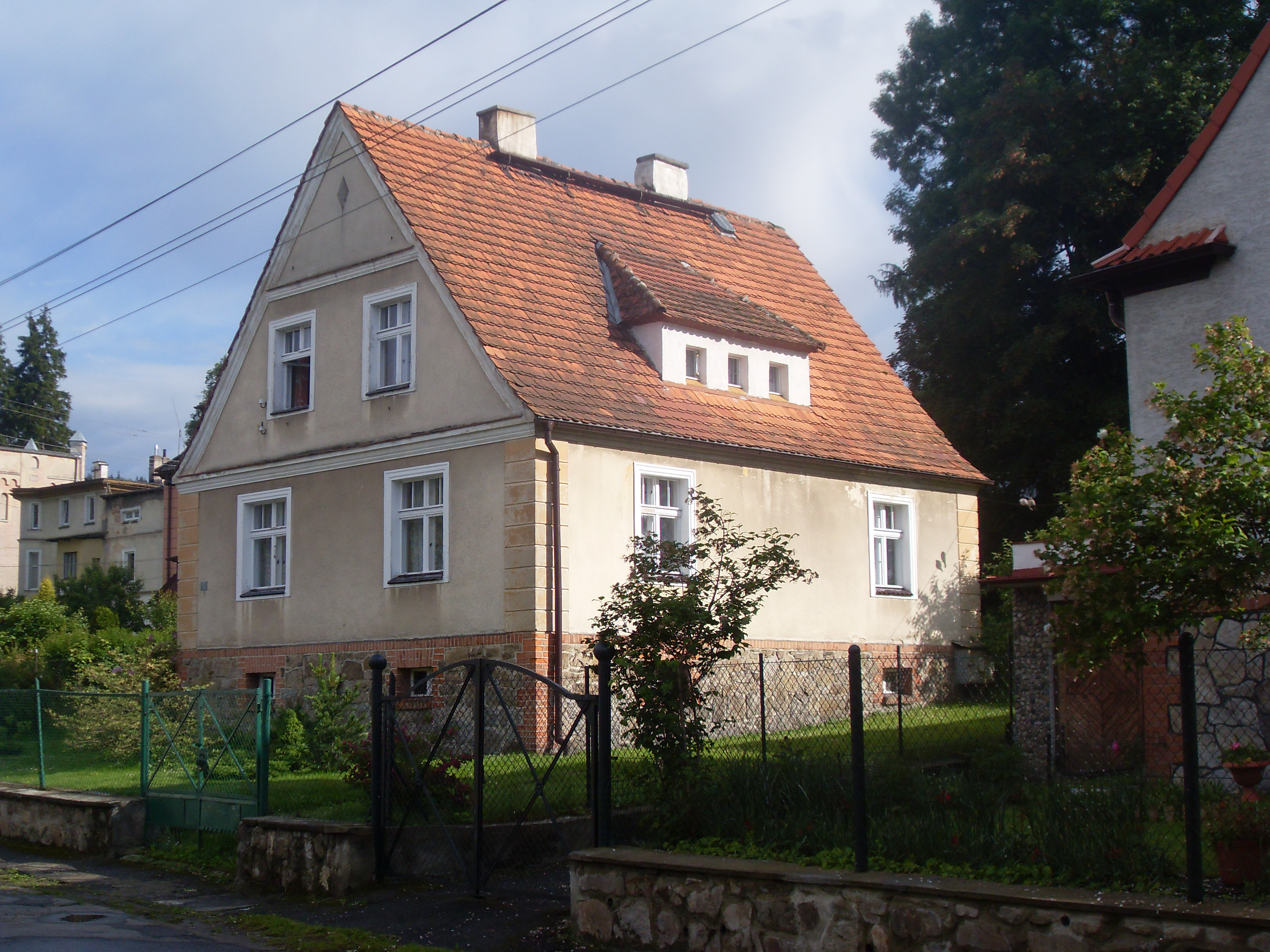
R. Pfeiffer"s House "Heimatsonne" in Lądek Zdroj (Bad Landeck), Konopnickiej 5 street

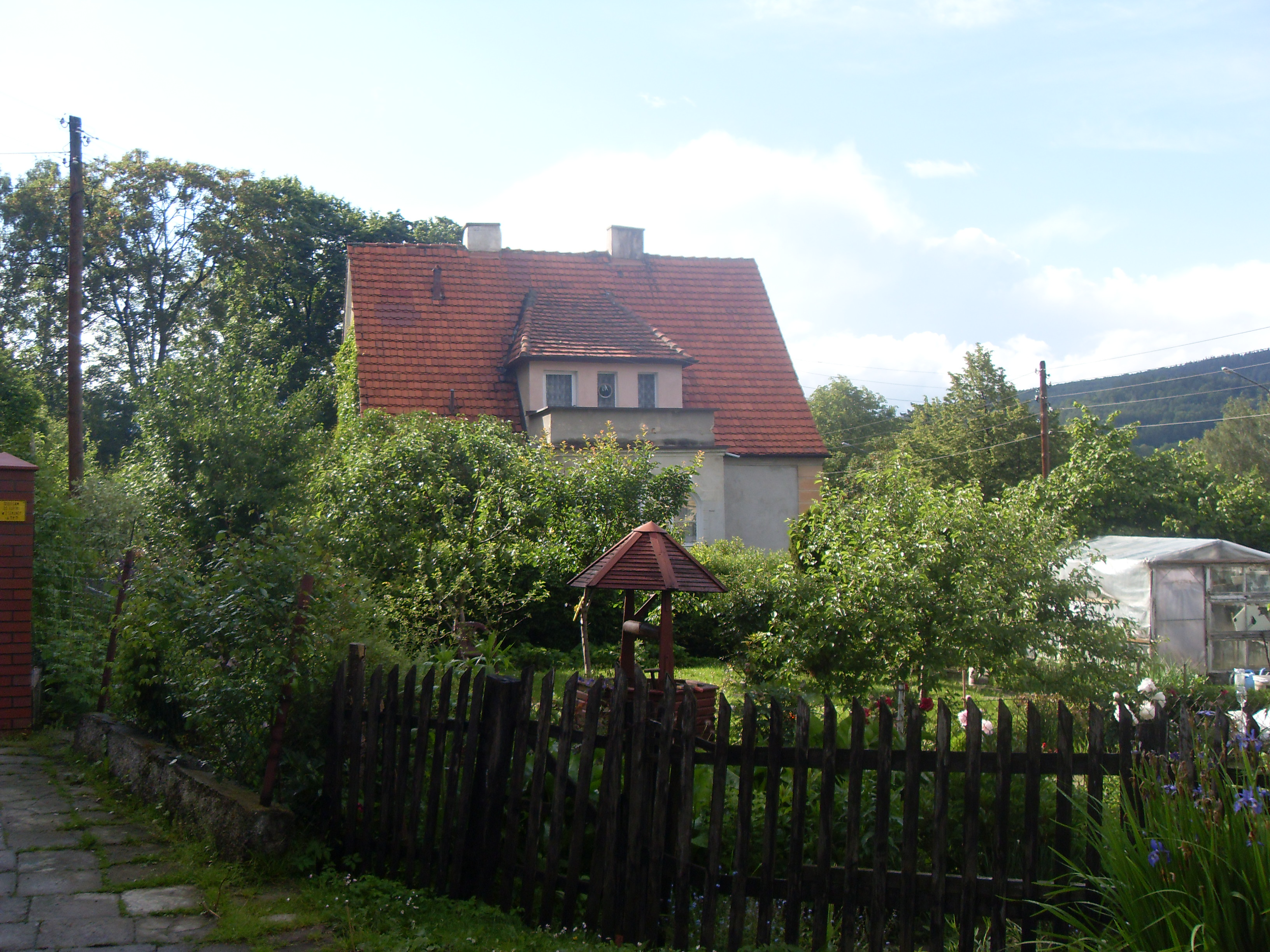
R. Pfeiffer"s House "Heimatsonne" in Lądek Zdroj (Bad Landeck), Konopnickiej 5 street

== Controversy ==
When the Spanish flu, the history's deadliest known influenza pandemic, began in 1918, most scientists believed that Pfeiffer's bacillus caused influenza. With the lethality of this outbreak (which killed an estimated 20 to 100 million worldwide) came urgency—researchers around the world began to search for Pfeiffer's bacillus in patients, hoping to develop antisera and vaccines that would protect against infection. In many patients, but not all, the bacteria were found. Failures to isolate B. influenzae (now known as Haemophilus influenzae) were generally ascribed to inadequate technique, as the bacteria were notoriously difficult to culture.

The first blow to Pfeiffer's theory came from Peter Olitsky and Frederick Gates at The Rockefeller Institute. Olitsky and Gates took nasal secretions from patients infected with the 1918 flu and passed them through Berkefeld filters, which exclude bacteria. The infectious agent — which caused lung disease in rabbits — passed through the filter, suggesting that it was not a bacterium. Although the duo had perhaps isolated the influenza virus (which they nevertheless referred to as an atypical bacterium called Bacterium pneumosintes), other researchers could not reproduce their results.
