= Odrodzenie, Greater Poland Voivodeship =

Odrodzenie
- Village
- Location within Poland
- Coordinates: 51°45′21″N 17°42′30″E
- Country: Poland
- Voivodeship: Greater Poland
- County: Krotoszyn
- Gmina: Krotoszyn

Odrodzenie [ɔdrɔˈd͡zɛɲɛ] is a village in the administrative district of Gmina Krotoszyn, within Krotoszyn County, Greater Poland Voivodeship, in west-central Poland.
