= Lutogniew, Greater Poland Voivodeship =

Lutogniew
- Village
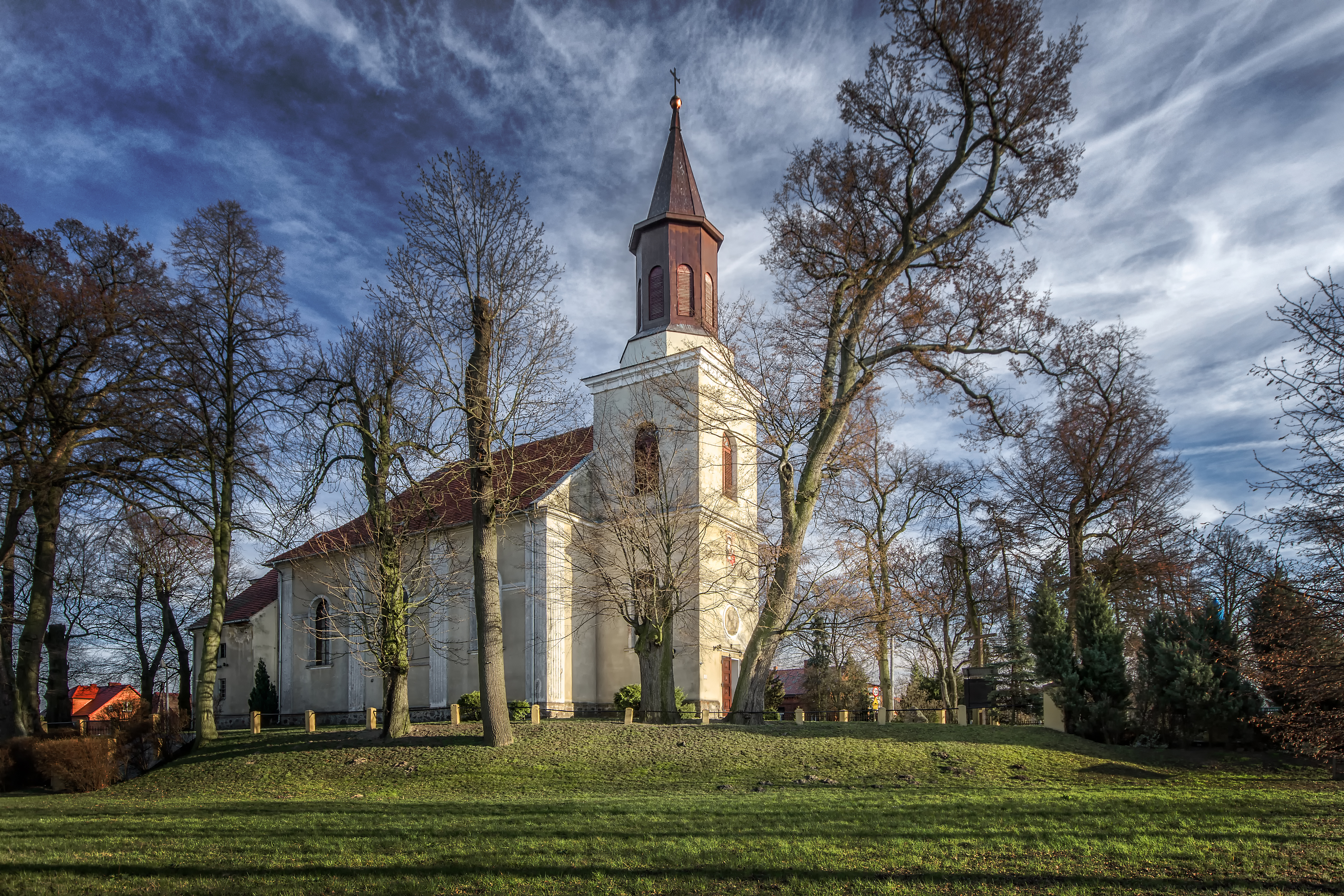
- Church of Holy Trinity

- Location within Poland
- Coordinates: 51°43′N 17°23′E
- Country: Poland
- Voivodeship: Greater Poland
- County: Krotoszyn
- Gmina: Krotoszyn

Lutogniew [luˈtɔɡɲɛf] is a village in the administrative district of Gmina Krotoszyn, within Krotoszyn County, Greater Poland Voivodeship, in west-central Poland.
