= Dąbrowa, Gmina Krotoszyn =

Dąbrowa
- Village
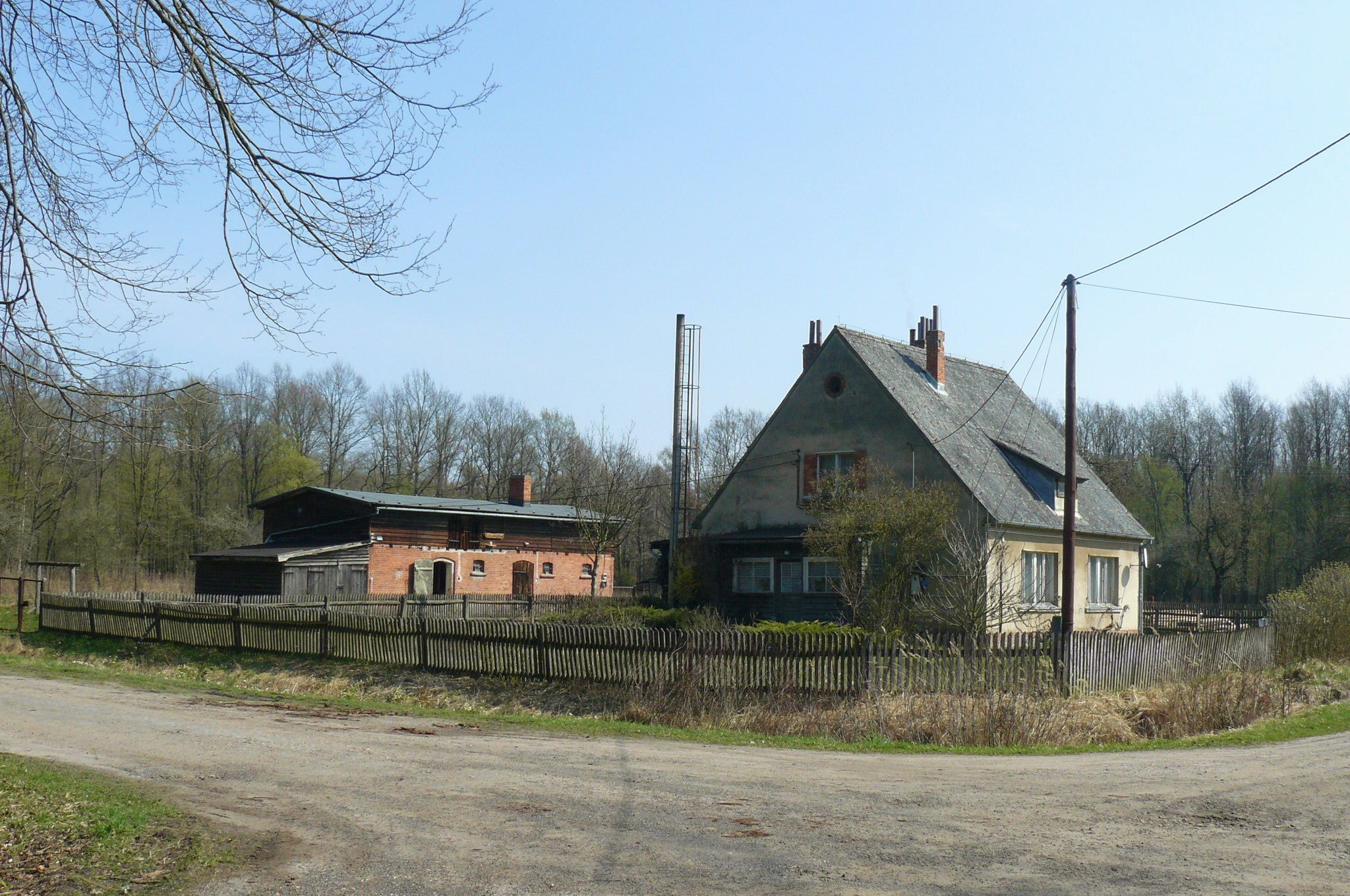
- Protected Landscape Area of Dąbrowy Krotoszyńskie and Baszków-Rochy, Jasne Pole complex. Former forester's lodge in Dąbrowa

- Location within Poland
- Coordinates: 51°46′02″N 17°36′51″E
- Country: Poland
- Voivodeship: Greater Poland
- County: Krotoszyn
- Gmina: Krotoszyn

Dąbrowa [dɔmˈbrɔva] is a village in the administrative district of Gmina Krotoszyn, within Krotoszyn County, Greater Poland Voivodeship, in west-central Poland.
