= Ruda, Krotoszyn County =

Ruda
- Village
- Location within Poland
- Coordinates: 51°39′17″N 17°15′58″E
- Country: Poland
- Voivodeship: Greater Poland
- County: Krotoszyn
- Gmina: Zduny

Ruda [ˈruda] is a village in the administrative district of Gmina Zduny, within Krotoszyn County, Greater Poland Voivodeship, in west-central Poland.
