= Brzezinka, Greater Poland Voivodeship =

Brzezinka
- Village
- Location within Poland
- Coordinates: 51°44′07″N 17°33′27″E
- Country: Poland
- Voivodeship: Greater Poland
- County: Krotoszyn
- Gmina: Krotoszyn

Brzezinka (Polish pronunciation: [bʐɛˈʑiŋka]) is a village in the administrative district of Gmina Krotoszyn, within Krotoszyn County, Greater Poland Voivodeship, in west-central Poland.
