= Siejew =

- Village
- Location within Poland
- Coordinates: 51°39′16″N 17°21′07″E
- Country: Poland
- Voivodeship: Greater Poland
- County: Krotoszyn
- Gmina: Zduny

Siejew [ˈɕɛjɛf] is a village in the administrative district of Gmina Zduny, within Krotoszyn County, Greater Poland Voivodeship, in west-central Poland.
