= Budy, Krotoszyn County =

Budy
- Village
- Location within Poland
- Coordinates: 51°48′42″N 17°35′8″E
- Country: Poland
- Voivodeship: Greater Poland
- County: Krotoszyn
- Gmina: Rozdrażew

Budy [ˈbudɨ] is a village in the administrative district of Gmina Rozdrażew, within Krotoszyn County, Greater Poland Voivodeship, in west-central Poland.
