= Osusz =

- Village
- Location within Poland
- Coordinates: 51°41′N 17°24′E
- Country: Poland
- Voivodeship: Greater Poland
- County: Krotoszyn
- Gmina: Krotoszyn

Osusz [ˈɔsuʂ] is a village in the administrative district of Gmina Krotoszyn, within Krotoszyn County, Greater Poland Voivodeship, in west-central Poland.
