= Bestwin =

- Village
- Location within Poland
- Coordinates: 51°40′N 17°17′E
- Country: Poland
- Voivodeship: Greater Poland
- County: Krotoszyn
- Gmina: Zduny

Bestwin [ˈbɛstfin] is a village in the administrative district of Gmina Zduny, within Krotoszyn County, Greater Poland Voivodeship, in west-central Poland.
