= Rozki =

Rozki may refer to the following places:

- Rożki, Lublin Voivodeship (east Poland)
- Rożki, Masovian Voivodeship (east-central Poland)
- Rożki, Świętokrzyskie Voivodeship (south-central Poland)
- Różki, Pomeranian Voivodeship (north Poland)

== See also ==
- Roszki, Gmina Krotoszyn, Krotoszyn County, Greater Poland Voivodeship, Poland; a village
- Roski (disambiguation)
- Russki (disambiguation)
