= Roski (disambiguation) =

Roski is a Canadian composites manufacturer.

Roski may also refer to:

People

- Edward P. Roski (born 1938) U.S. real estate mogul
- Ulrich Roski (born 1944) German singer-songwriter

Places

- Roški Slap (Roski Falls), river Krka, Šibenik-Knin, Dalmatia, Croatia; at the Roški Slap Hydroelectric Power Plant

Other uses

- Roški Slap Hydroelectric Power Plant, Šibenik-Knin, Dalmatia, Croatia

== See also ==
- Roszki, Poland (IPA: ˈrɔʂki) a village
- Rozki (disambiguation)
- Russki (disambiguation)
