= Szczerków =

- Village
- Location within Poland
- Coordinates: 51°40′59″N 17°23′33″E
- Country: Poland
- Voivodeship: Greater Poland
- County: Krotoszyn
- Gmina: Zduny
- Population: 60

Szczerków [ˈʂt͡ʂɛrkuf] is a village in the administrative district of Gmina Zduny, within Krotoszyn County, Greater Poland Voivodeship, in west-central Poland.
