= Sokołówka, Krotoszyn County =

Sokołówka
- Village
- Location within Poland
- Coordinates: 51°46′48″N 17°34′04″E
- Country: Poland
- Voivodeship: Greater Poland
- County: Krotoszyn
- Gmina: Krotoszyn

Sokołówka [sɔkɔˈwufka] is a village in the administrative district of Gmina Krotoszyn, within Krotoszyn County, Greater Poland Voivodeship, in west-central Poland.
