= Raciborów, Greater Poland Voivodeship =

Raciborów
- Village
- Location within Poland
- Coordinates: 51°44′57″N 17°24′9″E
- Country: Poland
- Voivodeship: Greater Poland
- County: Krotoszyn
- Gmina: Krotoszyn
- Population: 100

Raciborów [rat͡ɕiˈbɔruf] is a village in the administrative district of Gmina Krotoszyn, within Krotoszyn County, Greater Poland Voivodeship, in west-central Poland.
