= Brzoza =

Brzoza may refer to the following places in Poland:

- Brzoza, Lower Silesian Voivodeship (south-west Poland)
- Brzoza, Bydgoszcz County in Kuyavian-Pomeranian Voivodeship (north-central Poland)
- Brzoza, Toruń County in Kuyavian-Pomeranian Voivodeship (north-central Poland)
- Brzoza, Piotrków County in Łódź Voivodeship (central Poland)
- Brzoza, Wieluń County in Łódź Voivodeship (central Poland)
- Brzoza, Krotoszyn County in Greater Poland Voivodeship (west-central Poland)
- Brzoza, Szamotuły County in Greater Poland Voivodeship (west-central Poland)
- Brzoza, Lubusz Voivodeship (west Poland)

== See also ==
- Brzóza
- Brzóza Królewska
- Brzóza Stadnicka
