= Dzielice =

- Village
- Location within Poland
- Coordinates: 51°46′N 17°28′E
- Country: Poland
- Voivodeship: Greater Poland
- County: Krotoszyn
- Gmina: Rozdrażew

Dzielice [d͡ʑɛˈlit͡sɛ] is a village in the administrative district of Gmina Rozdrażew, within Krotoszyn County, Greater Poland Voivodeship, in west-central Poland.
