= Jastrzębiec, Greater Poland Voivodeship =

Jastrzębiec
- Village
- Location within Poland
- Coordinates: 51°44′33″N 17°38′43″E
- Country: Poland
- Voivodeship: Greater Poland
- County: Krotoszyn
- Gmina: Krotoszyn

Jastrzębiec [jasˈtʂɛmbjɛt͡s] is a village in the administrative district of Gmina Krotoszyn, within Krotoszyn County, Greater Poland Voivodeship, in west-central Poland.
