= Wygoda, Krotoszyn County =

Wygoda
- Village
- Location within Poland
- Coordinates: 51°46′55″N 17°26′39″E
- Country: Poland
- Voivodeship: Greater Poland
- County: Krotoszyn
- Gmina: Rozdrażew

Wygoda [vɨˈɡɔda] is a village in the administrative district of Gmina Rozdrażew, within Krotoszyn County, Greater Poland Voivodeship, in west-central Poland.
