= Baszków, Greater Poland Voivodeship =

Baszków
- Village
- Location within Poland
- Coordinates: 51°40′49″N 17°17′20″E
- Country: Poland
- Voivodeship: Greater Poland
- County: Krotoszyn
- Gmina: Zduny
- Population: 800

Baszków [ˈbaʂkuf] is a village in the administrative district of Gmina Zduny, within Krotoszyn County, Greater Poland Voivodeship, in west-central Poland.
