= Biadki =

- Village
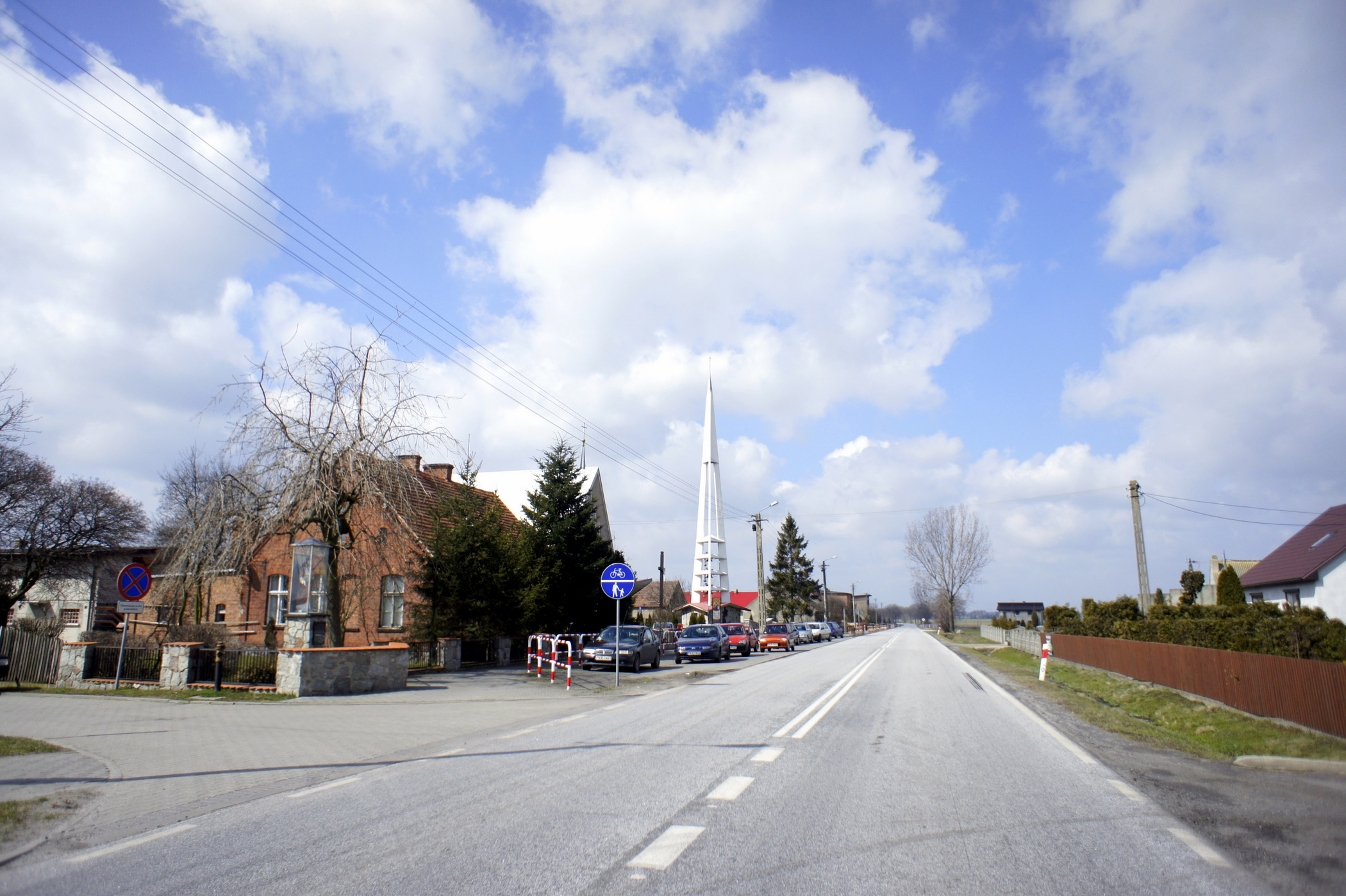

- Location within Poland
- Coordinates: 51°40′25″N 17°33′8″E
- Country: Poland
- Voivodeship: Greater Poland
- County: Krotoszyn
- Gmina: Krotoszyn
- Population: 1,700
- Time zone: UTC+1 (CET)
  - Summer (DST): UTC+2 (CEST)
- Vehicle registration: PKR

Biadki [ˈbjatki] is a village in the administrative district of Gmina Krotoszyn, within Krotoszyn County, Greater Poland Voivodeship, in west-central Poland.

== History ==
The area formed part of Poland since the establishment of the state in the 10th century. Biadki was a private village of Polish nobility, administratively located in the Pyzdry County in the Kalisz Voivodeship in the Greater Poland Province of the Kingdom of Poland. It was annexed by Prussia in the Second Partition of Poland in 1793. Following the Greater Poland uprising of 1806 it was regained by Poles and included within the short-lived Duchy of Warsaw, and after the duchy's dissolution in 1815, the village was reannexed by Prussia, and was also part of Germany from 1871. Following World War I, Poland regained independence and control of the village. According to the 1921 census, it had a population of 750, 97.7% Polish.

Following the joint German-Soviet invasion of Poland, which started World War II in September 1939, the village was occupied by Germany until 1945 and local Poles were subjected to various crimes. In November 1939, the Germans murdered six Polish residents of Biadki in the forest near Kobylin. In 1941, the occupiers carried out expulsions of Poles, who were initially deported to a transit camp in Łódź, and eventually deported to forced labour in Germany. Houses and farms of expelled Poles were handed over to new German colonists as part of the Lebensraum policy. In 1944, the Germans also brought dozens of prisoners of war of various nationalities to the village. They evacuated most of the prisoners of war in January 1945, leaving 18 Hungarians, who were then murdered by the Soviets who occupied the village on 23 January.
