= Rochy =

Rochy may mean the following:

- Rochy (Polish settlement), a settlement in Poland
- Rochy Putiray, a retired football player from Indonesia
- Rochy-Condé, a small village in northern France
- Rochester, Pennsylvania, sometimes called Rochy
