= Trzaski, Greater Poland Voivodeship =

Trzaski
- Village
- Location within Poland
- Coordinates: 51°41′48″N 17°19′40″E
- Country: Poland
- Voivodeship: Greater Poland
- County: Krotoszyn
- Gmina: Zduny

Trzaski [ˈtʂaski] is a village in the administrative district of Gmina Zduny, within Krotoszyn County, Greater Poland Voivodeship, in west-central Poland.
