= Antoine Kowalczyk =

Polish-Canadian, Servant of God

Venerable Antoine Kowalczyk OMI
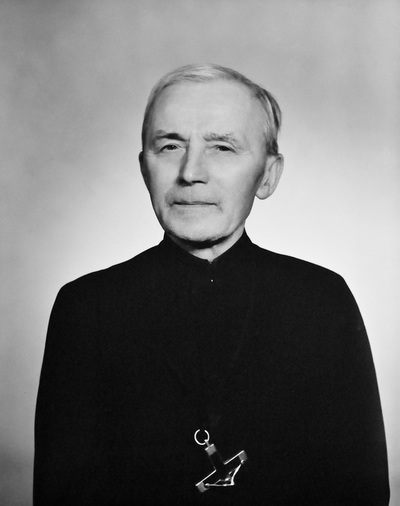
- Born: 4 June 1866; Dzierzanów, Poland
- Died: 10 July 1947 (aged 81); St. Albert, Canada
- Venerated in: Catholic Church
- Feast: July 10
- Patronage: Missionary Oblates of Mary Immaculate

Antoine Kowalczyk (4 June 1866 – 10 July 1947), also known as Brother Anthony or Brother Antoine, frère Antoine, Antoni Kowalczyk, and the Blacksmith of God, was a Polish-Canadian lay member of the Missionary Oblates of Mary Immaculate.

== Early life ==
Antoine Kowalczyk was born on June 4, 1866 in Dzierzanów, Krotoszyn, Poland, to a Catholic family of twelve. He was the sixth of twelve children of Ignacy (Ignatius) and Łucja (Lucy) Kowalczyk. After he completed elementary school, he would work on his family's farm and later train to be a blacksmith in Krotoszyn so he could work in Germany (Dresden and Hamburg).

=== Time in Germany ===
Kowalczyk went to work in Hamburg at the age of 24, facing abuse and harassment by his coworkers upon finding out he was Catholic, he grew ill facing blindness he went to a church and prayed, he was healed. He would later move to the Rhineland, later moving in with the Prunnenbaum family. He learned of the oblates, later beginning his novitiate on September 21, 1891 in, Holland.

== Religious life and life in Canada ==
He would spend his first years in the oblate in Holland, later volunteering to missions, later being sent to Canada. He is sent to Lac-la-Biche in Alberta to work at a sawmill, later suffering an accident on July 15, 1897, losing his hand, later replacing it with a hook. After this accident he would be sent to work in other laity work in St. Paul (then known as Saint-Paul-des-Metis) he stayed there for fourteen years, before moving to Edmonton. In Edmonton he would work in Saint Jean's College, he would work in manual labour, he also became admired among the students and faculty for his kindness and work ethic. He later built a replica of the Lourdes Grotto in the courtyard of the school.

=== Death ===
He would become paralyzed, and later die on July 10, 1947, in St. Albert.

He is buried at the oblate cemetery in St. Albert.

== Veneration ==
The Archdiocese of Edmonton first introduced his cause for beatification in 1952, and it has been under review by the Vatican since 1979.

Antoine Kowalczyk, would be declared venerable by a decree of Pope Francis, on March 28, 2013.

Several miracles and graces are attributed to him.

There is a Catholic elementary school named after him in Edmonton.

== Notes ==
Diocese of Edmundston, ANTOINE KOWALCZYK Un intime de la Vierge Marie, (in French)
