= Smoszew =

- Village
- Location within Poland
- Coordinates: 51°40′N 17°30′E
- Country: Poland
- Voivodeship: Greater Poland
- County: Krotoszyn
- Gmina: Krotoszyn

Smoszew [ˈsmɔʂɛf] is a village in the administrative district of Gmina Krotoszyn, within Krotoszyn County, Greater Poland Voivodeship, in west-central Poland.
