= Benice =

Benice may refer to places:

- Benice (Prague), a municipal district of Prague in the Czech Republic
- Benice, a village and part of Chrášťany (Benešov District) in the Czech Republic
- Benice, Greater Poland Voivodeship, a village in Poland
- Benice, West Pomeranian Voivodeship, a village in Poland
- Benice, Martin District, a village and municipality in Slovakia
