= Salnia =

- Settlement
- Location within Poland
- Coordinates: 51°41′36″N 17°24′04″E
- Country: Poland
- Voivodeship: Greater Poland
- County: Krotoszyn
- Gmina: Krotoszyn

Salnia [ˈsalɲa] is a settlement in the administrative district of Gmina Krotoszyn, within Krotoszyn County, Greater Poland Voivodeship, in west-central Poland.
