= Gorzupia =

Gorzupia may refer to the following places in Poland:

- Gorzupia, Greater Poland Voivodeship (west-central Poland)
- Gorzupia, Lubusz Voivodeship (western Poland)
