= Gmina Zduny =

Gmina Zduny may refer to either of the following administrative districts in Poland:

- Gmina Zduny, Greater Poland Voivodeship
- Gmina Zduny, Łódź Voivodeship
