= Maciejew =

- Village
- Location within Poland
- Coordinates: 51°47′23″N 17°32′59″E
- Country: Poland
- Voivodeship: Greater Poland
- County: Krotoszyn
- Gmina: Rozdrażew
- Population: 320

Maciejew [maˈt͡ɕɛjɛf] is a village in the administrative district of Gmina Rozdrażew, within Krotoszyn County, Greater Poland Voivodeship, in west-central Poland.
