= Chwałki, Greater Poland Voivodeship =

Chwałki
- Village
- Location within Poland
- Coordinates: 51°45′32″N 17°31′37″E
- Country: Poland
- Voivodeship: Greater Poland
- County: Krotoszyn
- Gmina: Rozdrażew
- Population: 51

Chwałki [ˈxfau̯ki] is a village in the administrative district of Gmina Rozdrażew, within Krotoszyn County, Greater Poland Voivodeship, in west-central Poland.
