= Dzierżanów, Greater Poland Voivodeship =

Dzierżanów
- Village
- Location within Poland
- Coordinates: 51°43′N 17°20′E
- Country: Poland
- Voivodeship: Greater Poland
- County: Krotoszyn
- Gmina: Krotoszyn

Dzierżanów [d͡ʑɛrˈʐanuf] is a village in the administrative district of Gmina Krotoszyn, within Krotoszyn County, Greater Poland Voivodeship, in west-central Poland.

== Notable people ==
Antoine Kowalczyk, Polish-Canadian, Servant of God, born and raised here.
