= Blessed Michael =

Blessed Michael may refer to:

- Blessed Michał Sopoćko, the Apostle of Divine Mercy
- Blessed Michał Kozal, bishop and martyr

== See also ==
- Saint Michael
