= Hadrianów =

- Settlement
- Location within Poland
- Coordinates: 51°40′20″N 17°19′5″E
- Country: Poland
- Voivodeship: Greater Poland
- County: Krotoszyn
- Gmina: Zduny

Hadrianów [xaˈdrjanuf] is a settlement in the administrative district of Gmina Zduny, within Krotoszyn County, Greater Poland Voivodeship, in west-central Poland.
