= Witki =

Witki may refer to the following places:

- Witki, Pułtusk County in Masovian Voivodeship (east-central Poland)
- Witki, Warsaw West County in Masovian Voivodeship (east-central Poland)
- Witki, Subcarpathian Voivodeship (south-east Poland)
- Witki, Greater Poland Voivodeship (west-central Poland)
- Witki, Warmian-Masurian Voivodeship (north Poland)
