= Dąbrowa, Gmina Rozdrażew =

Dąbrowa
- Village
- Location within Poland
- Coordinates: 51°45′02″N 17°30′40″E
- Country: Poland
- Voivodeship: Greater Poland
- County: Krotoszyn
- Gmina: Rozdrażew

Dąbrowa [dɔmˈbrɔva] is a village in the administrative district of Gmina Rozdrażew, within Krotoszyn County, Greater Poland Voivodeship, in west-central Poland.
