= Wyki =

- Village
- Location within Poland
- Coordinates: 51°50′N 17°35′E
- Country: Poland
- Voivodeship: Greater Poland
- County: Krotoszyn
- Gmina: Rozdrażew

Wyki [ˈvɨki] is a village in the administrative district of Gmina Rozdrażew, within Krotoszyn County, Greater Poland Voivodeship, in west-central Poland.
