= Sędziszew =

- Village
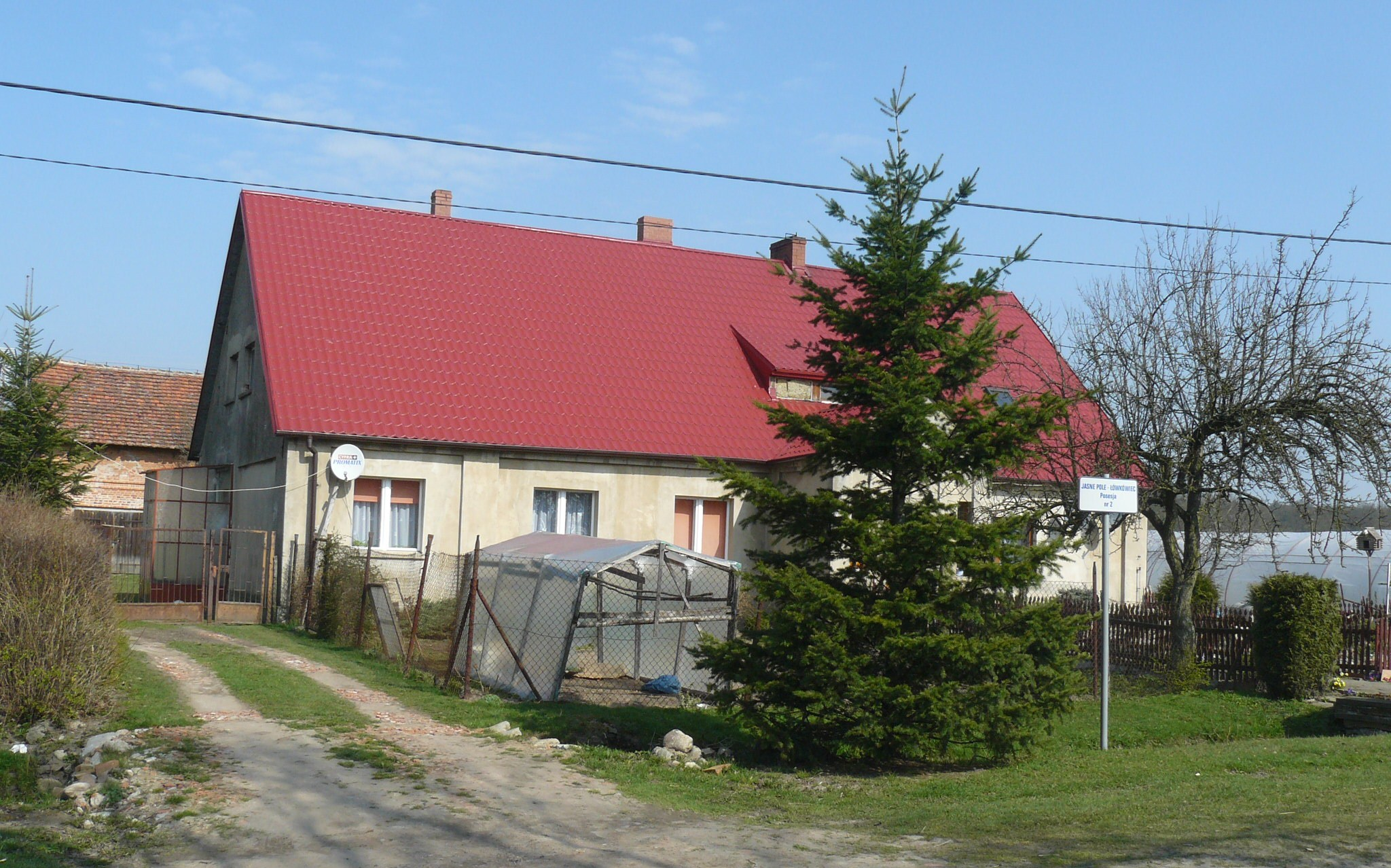

- Location within Poland
- Coordinates: 51°42′56″N 17°33′58″E
- Country: Poland
- Voivodeship: Greater Poland
- County: Krotoszyn
- Gmina: Krotoszyn

Sędziszew [sɛnˈd͡ʑiʂɛf] is a village in the administrative district of Gmina Krotoszyn, within Krotoszyn County, Greater Poland Voivodeship, in west-central Poland.
