= Jelonek, Krotoszyn County =

Jelonek
- Village
- Location within Poland
- Coordinates: 51°45′08″N 17°32′50″E
- Country: Poland
- Voivodeship: Greater Poland
- County: Krotoszyn
- Gmina: Krotoszyn

Jelonek [jɛˈlɔnɛk] is a village in the administrative district of Gmina Krotoszyn, within Krotoszyn County, Greater Poland Voivodeship, in west-central Poland.
