= Chachalnia =

- Village
- Location within Poland
- Coordinates: 51°38′N 17°26′E
- Country: Poland
- Voivodeship: Greater Poland
- County: Krotoszyn
- Gmina: Zduny
- Population (approx.): 250

Chachalnia [xaˈxalɲa] is a village in the administrative district of Gmina Zduny, within Krotoszyn County, Greater Poland Voivodeship, in west-central Poland.

The village has an approximate population of 250.
