= Rudy, Krotoszyn County =

Rudy
- Village
- Location within Poland
- Coordinates: 51°41′07″N 17°36′02″E
- Country: Poland
- Voivodeship: Greater Poland
- County: Krotoszyn
- Gmina: Krotoszyn

Rudy [ˈrudɨ] is a village in the administrative district of Gmina Krotoszyn, within Krotoszyn County, Greater Poland Voivodeship, in west-central Poland.
