= Unisław, Greater Poland Voivodeship =

Unisław
- Village
- Location within Poland
- Coordinates: 51°46′N 17°22′E
- Country: Poland
- Voivodeship: Greater Poland
- County: Krotoszyn
- Gmina: Krotoszyn

Unisław (Polish pronunciation: [uˈɲiswaf]) is a village in the administrative district of Gmina Krotoszyn, within Krotoszyn County, Greater Poland Voivodeship, in west-central Poland.
