= Perzyce =

- Village
- Location within Poland
- Coordinates: 51°40′N 17°25′E
- Country: Poland
- Voivodeship: Greater Poland
- County: Krotoszyn
- Gmina: Zduny
- Population (approx.): 250

Perzyce [pɛˈʐɨt͡sɛ] or Pierzyce is a village in the administrative district of Gmina Zduny, within Krotoszyn County, Greater Poland Voivodeship, in west-central Poland. During Kingdom of Poland, the village was officially recognized as Pierzyce.

The village has an approximate population of 250.
