= Jasne Pole =

- Village
- Location within Poland
- Coordinates: 51°42′N 17°32′E
- Country: Poland
- Voivodeship: Greater Poland
- County: Krotoszyn
- Gmina: Krotoszyn
- Population: 270

Jasne Pole [ˈjasnɛ ˈpɔlɛ] is a village in the administrative district of Gmina Krotoszyn, within Krotoszyn County, Greater Poland Voivodeship, in west-central Poland.
