= Bożacin =

Bożacin refers to the following places in Poland:

- Bożacin, Greater Poland Voivodeship
- Bożacin, Kuyavian-Pomeranian Voivodeship
