= Wróżewy =

- Village
- Location within Poland
- Coordinates: 51°43′N 17°24′E
- Country: Poland
- Voivodeship: Greater Poland
- County: Krotoszyn
- Gmina: Krotoszyn

Wróżewy [vruˈʐɛvɨ] is a village in the administrative district of Gmina Krotoszyn, within Krotoszyn County, Greater Poland Voivodeship, in west-central Poland.
