= Wronów, Krotoszyn County =

Wronów
- Village
- Location within Poland
- Coordinates: 51°41′41″N 17°26′13″E
- Country: Poland
- Voivodeship: Greater Poland
- County: Krotoszyn
- Gmina: Krotoszyn

Wronów [ˈvrɔnuf] is a village in the administrative district of Gmina Krotoszyn, within Krotoszyn County, Greater Poland Voivodeship, in west-central Poland.
