= Miłowiec =

- Village
- Location within Poland
- Coordinates: 51°44′39″N 17°41′31″E
- Country: Poland
- Voivodeship: Greater Poland
- County: Krotoszyn
- Gmina: Krotoszyn

Miłowiec [miˈwɔvjɛt͡s] is a village in the administrative district of Gmina Krotoszyn, within Krotoszyn County, Greater Poland Voivodeship, in west-central Poland.
