= Ugrzele =

- Village
- Location within Poland
- Coordinates: 51°43′55″N 17°38′20″E
- Country: Poland
- Voivodeship: Greater Poland
- County: Krotoszyn
- Gmina: Krotoszyn
- Population (approx.): 60

Ugrzele [uˈɡʐɛlɛ] is a village in the administrative district of Gmina Krotoszyn, within Krotoszyn County, Greater Poland Voivodeship, in west-central Poland.

The village has an approximate population of 60.
