= Pasteur Medal =

Pasteur Medal may refer to:

- Pasteur Medal (Illinoisan)
- Pasteur Medal (Swedish)
- UNESCO/Institut Pasteur Medal, a joint award
