= Stary Las =

Stary Las may refer to the following places:

- Stary Las, Greater Poland Voivodeship (west-central Poland)
- Stary Las, Opole Voivodeship (south-west Poland)
- Stary Las, Pomeranian Voivodeship (north Poland)
