= Henryków, Greater Poland Voivodeship =

Henryków
- Village
- Location within Poland
- Coordinates: 51°45′N 17°29′E
- Country: Poland
- Voivodeship: (Greater Poland Voivodeship) Greater Poland
- County: Krotoszyn
- Gmina: Rozdrażew

Henryków [xɛnˈrɨkuf] is a village in the administrative district of Gmina Rozdrażew, within Krotoszyn County, Greater Poland Voivodeship, in west-central Poland.
