= Konarzew, Greater Poland Voivodeship =

Konarzew
- Village
- Location within Poland
- Coordinates: 51°41′N 17°23′E
- Country: Poland
- Voivodeship: Greater Poland
- County: Krotoszyn
- Gmina: Zduny
- Population: 700

Konarzew [kɔˈnaʐɛf] is a village in the administrative district of Gmina Zduny, within Krotoszyn County, Greater Poland Voivodeship, in west-central Poland.
