= Nowy Folwark, Krotoszyn County =

Nowy Folwark
- Village
- Location within Poland
- Coordinates: 51°42′N 17°27′E
- Country: Poland
- Voivodeship: Greater Poland
- County: Krotoszyn
- Gmina: Krotoszyn

Nowy Folwark [ˈnɔvɨ ˈfɔlvark] is a village in the administrative district of Gmina Krotoszyn, within Krotoszyn County, Greater Poland Voivodeship, in west-central Poland.

== Notable people ==
- Michał Kozal, Polish clergyman, martyr of the Roman Catholic Church
