= Piaski, Krotoszyn County =

Piaski
- Village
- Location within Poland
- Coordinates: 51°38′N 17°31′E
- Country: Poland
- Voivodeship: Greater Poland
- County: Krotoszyn
- Gmina: Zduny
- Time zone: UTC+1 (CET)
  - Summer (DST): UTC+2 (CEST)
- Postal code: 63-760
- Vehicle registration: PKR

Piaski (Polish pronunciation: [ˈpjaskʲi]) is a village in the administrative district of Gmina Zduny, within Krotoszyn County, Greater Poland Voivodeship, in west-central Poland.
