= Nowa Wieś, Krotoszyn County =

Nowa Wieś
- Village
- Location within Poland
- Coordinates: 51°48′45″N 17°34′10″E
- Country: Poland
- Voivodeship: Greater Poland
- County: Krotoszyn
- Gmina: Rozdrażew
- Population: 580

Nowa Wieś [ˈnɔva ˈvjɛɕ] is a village in the administrative district of Gmina Rozdrażew, within Krotoszyn County, Greater Poland Voivodeship, in west-central Poland.
