= Stary Las, Greater Poland Voivodeship =

Stary Las
- Village
- Location within Poland
- Coordinates: 51°46′33″N 17°39′37″E
- Country: Poland
- Voivodeship: Greater Poland
- County: Krotoszyn
- Gmina: Krotoszyn

Stary Las [ˈstarɨ ˈlas] is a village in the administrative district of Gmina Krotoszyn, within Krotoszyn County, Greater Poland Voivodeship, in west-central Poland.
