= Gmina Krotoszyn =

Gmina Krotoszyn Krotoszyn Commune
- Gmina
- Flag Coat of arms

- Coordinates (Krotoszyn): 51°41′N 17°26′E
- Country: Poland
- Voivodeship: Greater Poland
- County: Krotoszyn
- Seat: Krotoszyn

Area
  - Total: 255.52 km^{2} (98.66 sq mi)

Population (2006)
  - Total: 40,360
  - Density: 158.0/km^{2} (409.1/sq mi)
  - Urban: 29,421
  - Rural: 10,939
- Website: http://www.krotoszyn.pl/

Gmina Krotoszyn is an urban-rural gmina (administrative district) in Krotoszyn County, Greater Poland Voivodeship, in west-central Poland. Its seat is the town of Krotoszyn, which lies approximately 88 kilometres (55 mi) south-east of the regional capital Poznań.

The gmina covers an area of 255.52 square kilometres (98.7 sq mi), and as of 2006 its total population is 40,360 (of which the population of Krotoszyn amounts to 29,421, and the population of the rural part of the gmina is 10,939).

== Villages ==
Apart from the town of Krotoszyn, Gmina Krotoszyn contains the villages and settlements of Baszyny, Benice, Biadki, Bór, Bożacin, Brzezinka, Brzoza, Chwaliszew, Dąbrowa, Durzyn, Duszna Górka, Dzierżanów, Gorzupia, Janów, Jasne Pole, Jastrzębiec, Jaźwiny, Jelonek, Kobierno, Łówkówiec, Lutogniew, Miłowiec, Nowy Folwark, Odrodzenie, Orpiszew, Osusz, Pustkowie Jędrzejewskie, Raciborów, Romanów, Roszki, Rozdrażewek, Różopole, Rudy, Ryczków, Salnia, Sędziszew, Smoszew, Sokołówka, Stare Budy, Stary Las, Świnków, Teresiny, Tomnice, Ugrzele, Unisław, Ustków, Wielowieś, Witki, Wronów and Wróżewy.

== Neighbouring gminas ==
Gmina Krotoszyn is bordered by the town of Sulmierzyce and by the gminas of Dobrzyca, Kobylin, Koźmin Wielkopolski, Ostrów Wielkopolski, Pogorzela, Raszków, Rozdrażew and Zduny.
