= Brzoza, Krotoszyn County =

Brzoza
- Village
- Location within Poland
- Coordinates: 51°44′22″N 17°28′15″E
- Country: Poland
- Voivodeship: Greater Poland
- County: Krotoszyn
- Gmina: Krotoszyn

Brzoza [ˈbʐɔza] is a village in the administrative district of Gmina Krotoszyn, within Krotoszyn County, Greater Poland Voivodeship, in west-central Poland.
