= Sebastian Klonowic =

Polish poet, composer and mayor of Lublin

Sebastian Fabian Klonowic
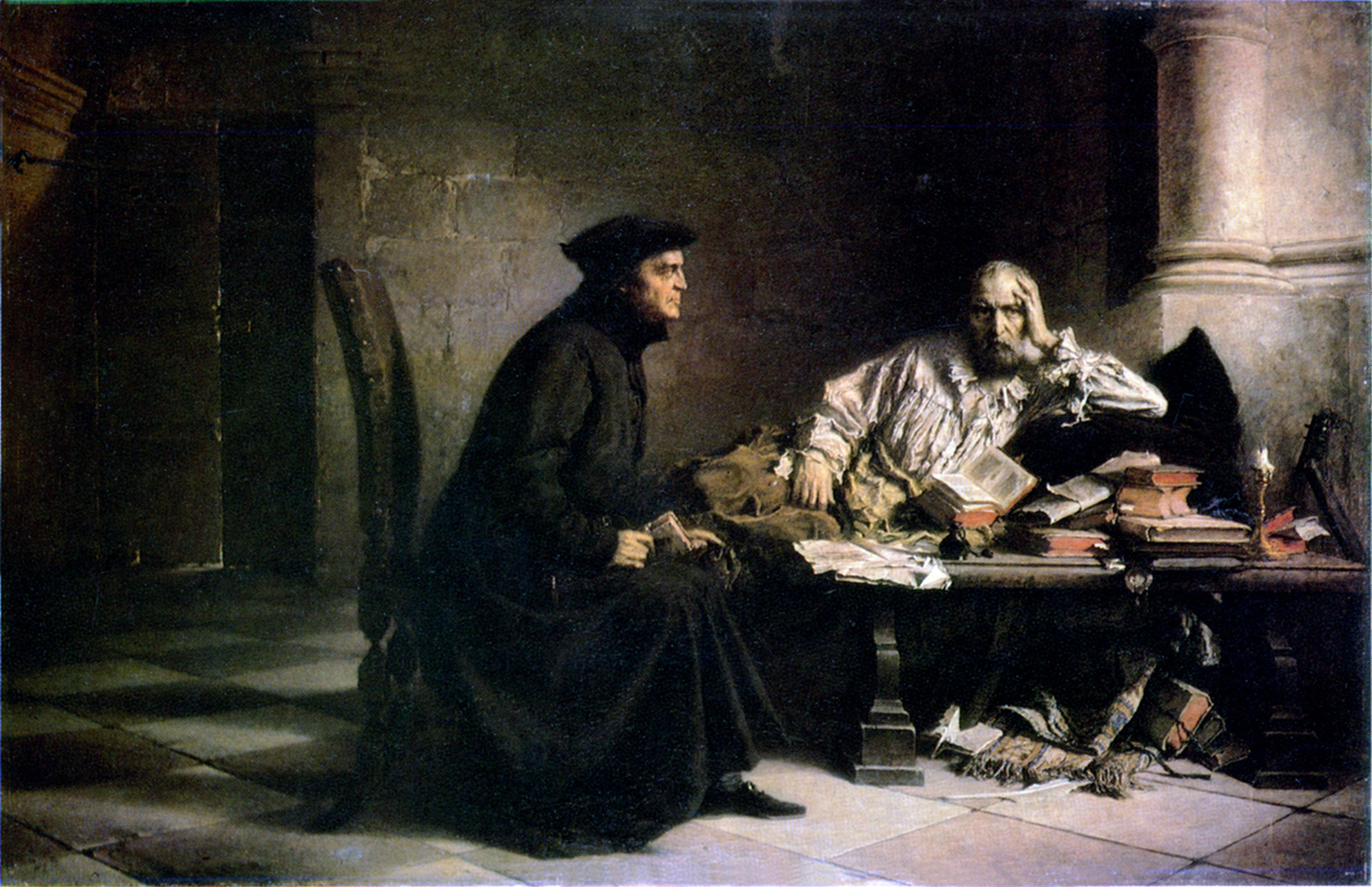
- Death of Acernus by Wilhelm Leopolski, 1867
- Born: 1545; Sulmierzyce, Poland
- Died: 29 August 1602 (aged 56–57); Lublin, Poland
- Occupations: poet, composer
- Writing career
- Pen name: Acernus
- Language: Polish, Latin

Sebastian Fabian Klonowic (1545 Sulmierzyce – 29 August 1602 Lublin), alternatively known by his Latin epithet Acernus, was a Polish poet, composer and mayor of Lublin.

== Biography ==
He studied at the University of Kraków. He wrote in both Polish and Latin. Klonowic first lived in Lwów, then he settled in Lublin. While in Lublin, he became mayor.

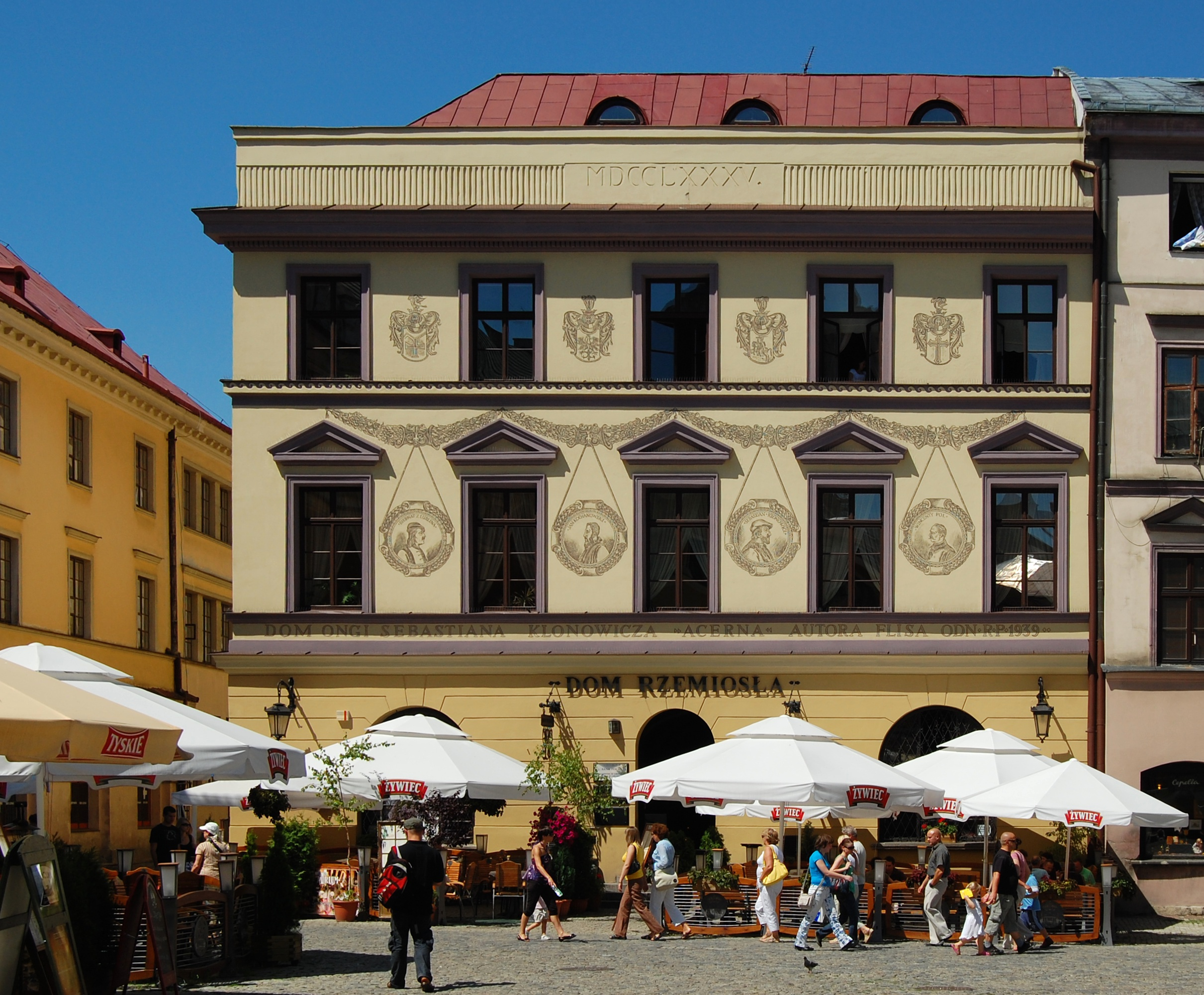
House of Sebastian Klonowic in Lublin

Klonowic was critical of the Jesuit Order and voiced his opposition in Latin. He did not shy away from directly lambasting the Order in his works. His Latin poems were filled with Latinized Polish words, and on the other hand his Polish poems were often made unintelligible by the use of Latinisms and Hellenisms literally translated. He lived his last years on the charity of the Jesuits.

== Famous works ==
- Roxolania (1584) — a description of the people and land of Ruthenia
- Flis, to Jest Spuszczanie Statków Wisłą (1595) — an early example of the Sapphic stanza in Polish poetry, exceptional for its length
- Worek Judaszów (1600)
- Victoria Deorum (1587)
- Żale nagrobne na ślachetnie urodzonego Pana Jana Kochanowskiego
- Gorais
- Hebdomas, to jest Siedem tegodniowych piosnek wyjętych z pierwszych Ksiąg Moiżeszowych kapituły pierwszej, co którego dnia Pan Bóg stworzył i jako siódmego dnia odpoczynął, krótko zebranych przez Sebastyjana Klonowica z Sulimierzyc, pisarza ławicy lubelskiej (1581) — songs
