= Russki =

Russki and Russky (pl. Russkies) are English transliterations of the Russian word русский ("Russian"). The terms may refer to:

- Russki, a derogatory term for Russians.
- Russky Island, an island off Vladivostok, Russia
- Russky Island (Kara Sea), off the northern coast of Russia
- Russky Bridge, between the city of Vladivostok and Russky Island
- Russkies, a 1987 American drama film

== See also ==
- Roski (disambiguation)
- Rozki (disambiguation)
