= Gmina Zduny, Greater Poland Voivodeship =

Gmina Zduny Zduny Commune
- Gmina
- Flag Coat of arms

- Coordinates (Zduny): 51°38′48″N 17°22′40″E
- Country: Poland
- Voivodeship: Greater Poland
- County: Krotoszyn
- Seat: Zduny

Area
  - Total: 85.2 km^{2} (32.9 sq mi)

Population (2018)
  - Total: 7,550
  - Density: 88.6/km^{2} (230/sq mi)
  - Urban: 4,498
  - Rural: 2,448
- Website: https://www.zduny.pl

Gmina Zduny is an urban-rural gmina (administrative district) in Krotoszyn County, Greater Poland Voivodeship, in west-central Poland. Its seat is the town of Zduny, which lies approximately 6 kilometres (4 mi) south-west of Krotoszyn and 90 km (56 mi) south of the regional capital Poznań.

The gmina covers an area of 85.2 square kilometres (32.9 sq mi), and as of 2006 its total population is 6,946 (out of which the population of Zduny amounts to 4,498, and the population of the rural part of the gmina is 2,448).

== Villages ==
Apart from the town of Zduny, Gmina Zduny contains the villages and settlements of Baszków, Bestwin, Chachalnia, Dziewiąte, Hadrianów, Konarzew, Ostatni Grosz, Perzyce, Piaski, Rochy, Ruda, Siejew, Szczerków and Trzaski.

== Neighbouring gminas ==
Gmina Zduny is bordered by the town of Sulmierzyce and by the gminas of Cieszków, Jutrosin, Kobylin, Krotoszyn and Milicz.
