= Gorzupia, Greater Poland Voivodeship =

Gorzupia
- Village
- Location within Poland
- Coordinates: 51°41′39″N 17°30′46″E
- Country: Poland
- Voivodeship: Greater Poland
- County: Krotoszyn
- Gmina: Krotoszyn
- Population: 695

Gorzupia [ɡɔˈʐupja] is a village in the administrative district of Gmina Krotoszyn, within Krotoszyn County, Greater Poland Voivodeship, in west-central Poland.
