= Rozdrażew =

- Village
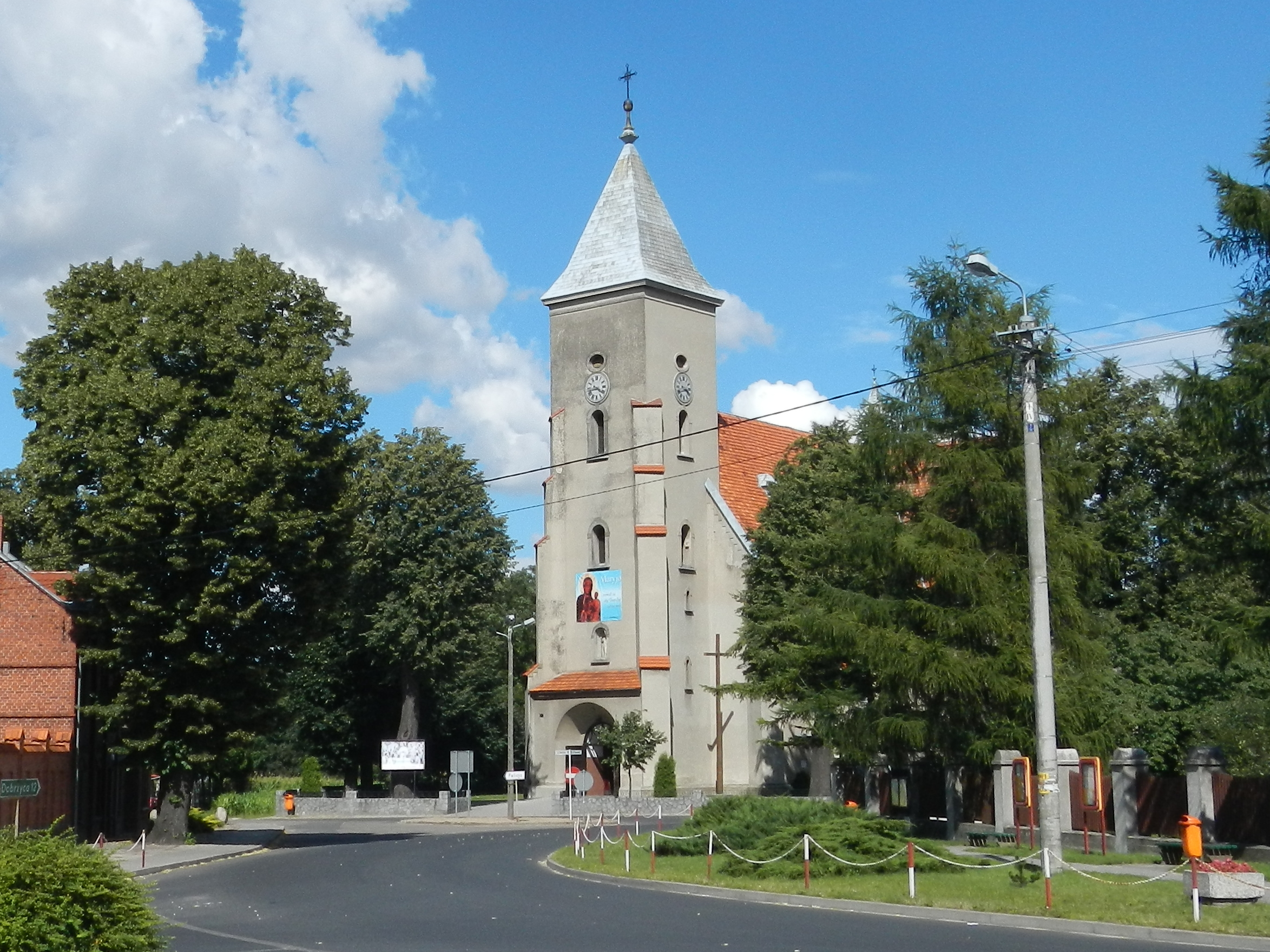
- Saint John the Baptist church

- Location within Poland
- Coordinates: 51°47′N 17°31′E
- Country: Poland
- Voivodeship: Greater Poland
- County: Krotoszyn
- Gmina: Rozdrażew
- Population: 1,800

Rozdrażew ([rɔzˈdraʐɛf]) is a village in Krotoszyn County, Greater Poland Voivodeship, in west-central Poland. It is the seat of the gmina (administrative district) called Gmina Rozdrażew.
