= Benice, Greater Poland Voivodeship =

Benice
- Village
- Location within Poland
- Coordinates: 51°45′N 17°23′E
- Country: Poland
- Voivodeship: Greater Poland
- County: Krotoszyn
- Gmina: Krotoszyn
- Population: 700

Benice [bɛˈnit͡sɛ] is a village in the administrative district of Gmina Krotoszyn, within Krotoszyn County, Greater Poland Voivodeship, in west-central Poland.
