= Witki, Greater Poland Voivodeship =

Witki
- Village
- Location within Poland
- Coordinates: 51°44′06″N 17°39′17″E
- Country: Poland
- Voivodeship: Greater Poland
- County: Krotoszyn
- Gmina: Krotoszyn

Witki [ˈvitki] is a village in the administrative district of Gmina Krotoszyn, within Krotoszyn County, Greater Poland Voivodeship, in west-central Poland.
