= Gmina Rozdrażew =

Gmina Rozdrażew Rozdrażew Commune
- Gmina
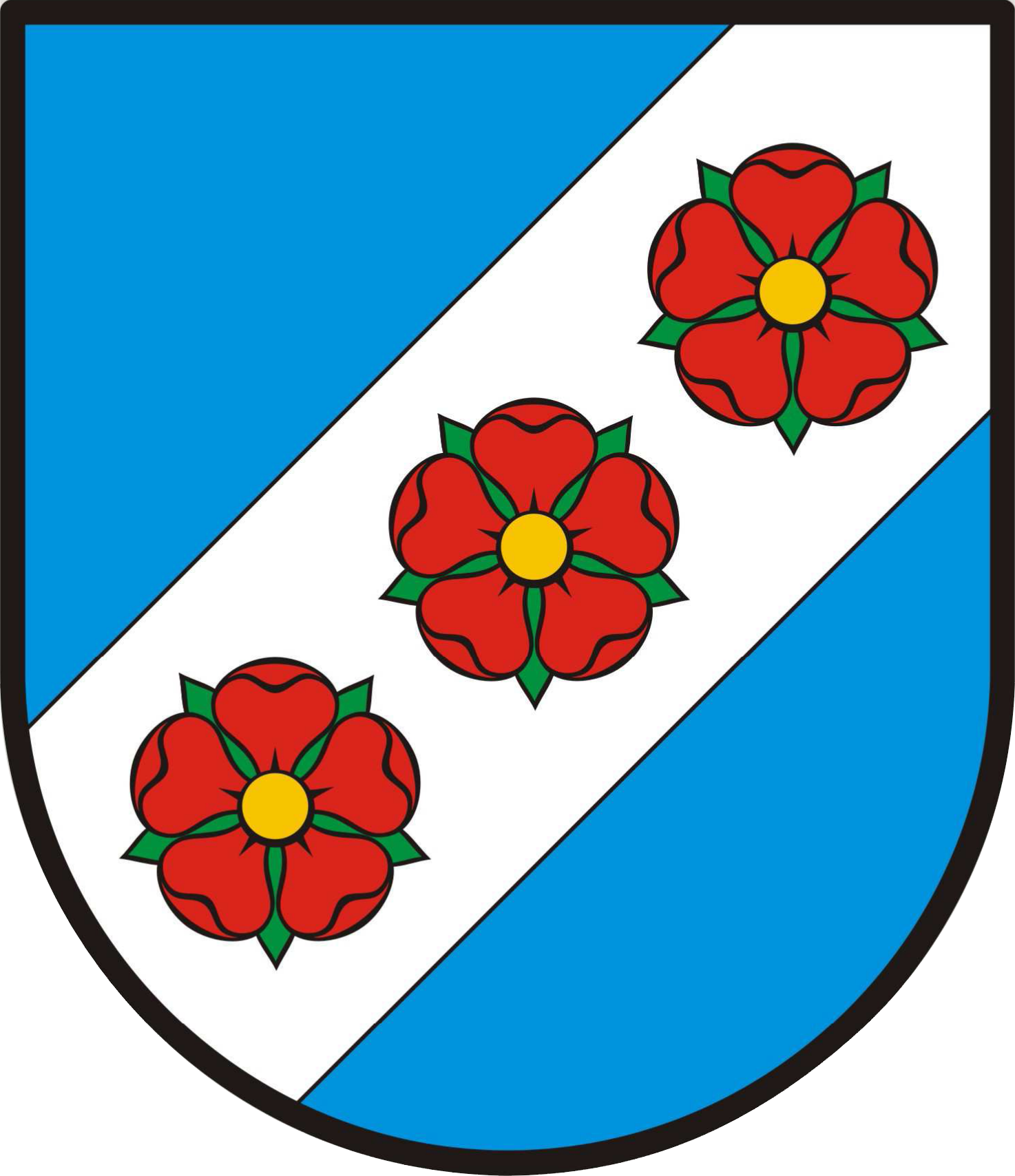
- Coat of arms

- Coordinates (Rozdrażew): 51°47′N 17°31′E
- Country: Poland
- Voivodeship: Greater Poland
- County: Krotoszyn
- Seat: Rozdrażew

Area
  - Total: 79.47 km^{2} (30.68 sq mi)

Population (2006)
  - Total: 5,155
  - Density: 64.87/km^{2} (168.0/sq mi)
- Website: http://www.rozdrazew.pl

Gmina Rozdrażew is a rural gmina (administrative district) in Krotoszyn County, Greater Poland Voivodeship, in west-central Poland. Its seat is the village of Rozdrażew, which lies approximately 13 kilometres (8 mi) north-east of Krotoszyn and 80 km (50 mi) south-east of the regional capital Poznań.

The gmina covers an area of 79.47 square kilometres (30.7 sq mi), and as of 2006 its total population is 5,155.

== Villages ==
Gmina Rozdrażew contains the villages and settlements of Budy, Chwałki, Dąbrowa, Dębowiec, Dzielice, Grębów, Henryków, Maciejew, Nowa Wieś, Rozdrażew, Trzemeszno, Wolenice, Wygoda and Wyki.

== Neighbouring gminas ==
Gmina Rozdrażew is bordered by the gminas of Dobrzyca, Koźmin Wielkopolski and Krotoszyn.
