= Kobylin =

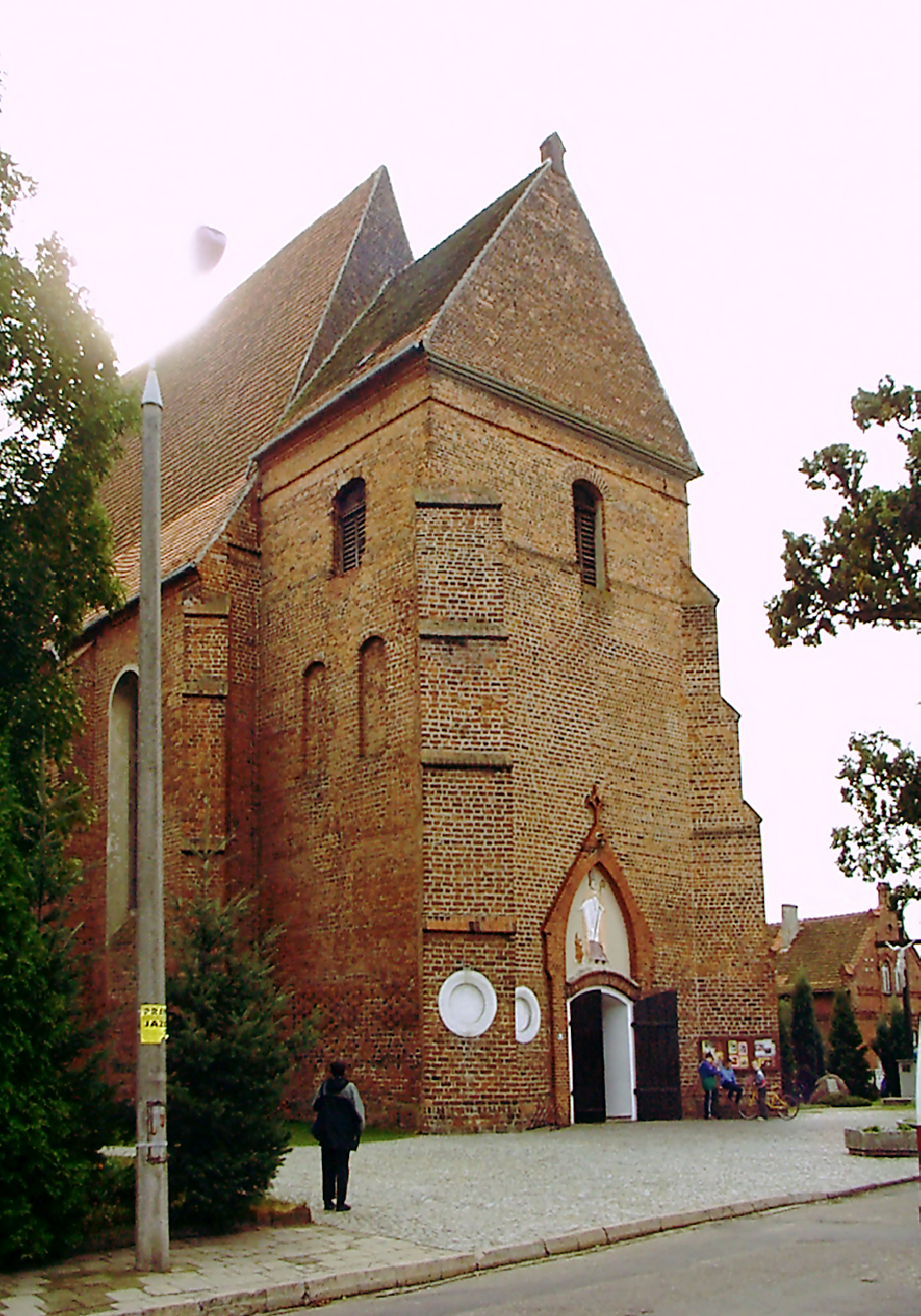
- Gothic Saint Stanislaus Kostka church in Kobylin

- Coat of arms

- Location within Poland
- Coordinates: 51°42′N 17°14′E
- Country: Poland
- Voivodeship: Greater Poland
- County: Krotoszyn
- Gmina: Kobylin
- Town rights: before 1303

Area
  - Total: 4.92 km^{2} (1.90 sq mi)

Population (2010)
  - Total: 3,130
  - Density: 636/km^{2} (1,650/sq mi)
- Time zone: UTC+1 (CET)
  - Summer (DST): UTC+2 (CEST)
- Postal code: 63-740
- Climate: Cfb
- Website: http://www.kobylin.pl

Kobylin ([kɔˈbɨlʲin]) is a town in Krotoszyn County, Greater Poland Voivodeship, Poland, with 3,130 inhabitants (2010).

== History ==
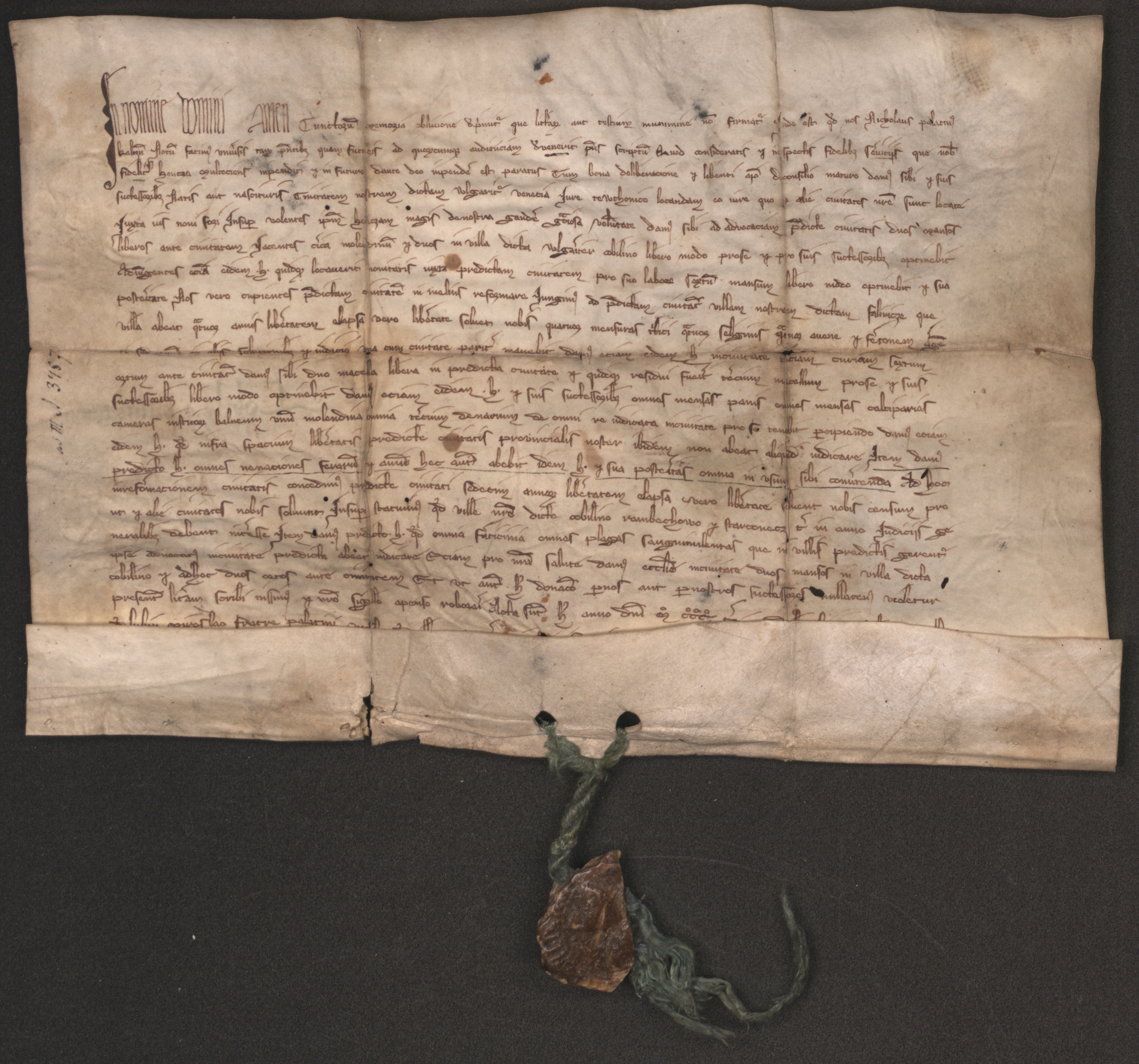
Document of granting town rights, ca. 1303

In the Early Middle Ages it was a market settlement, which became part of the emerging Polish state in the 10th century, as part of the Greater Poland region. It was mentioned in documents from 1289. Kobylin was granted town rights before 1303. Initially, it was called Wenecja. It was a private town administratively located in the Pyzdry County in the Kalisz Voivodeship in the Greater Poland Province of the Kingdom of Poland. In 1456 a school was established at the Bernardine monastery. Its graduates usually enrolled to the University of Kraków, Poland's oldest and leading university. Among them were professors of the University of Kraków: Maciej of Kobylin, who was a philosopher and one of the teachers of Nicolaus Copernicus, Piotr of Kobylin, author of the first known Polish textbook, and Andrzej Glaber, translator of the first anatomical book published in the Polish language. Famous fairs were held in Kobylin during the reign of King Sigismund II Augustus. During the Thirty Years' War, Protestant refugees from Silesia settled in the town. One of the greatest Polish Baroque poets Samuel Twardowski was buried in the Bernardine church. The town was plundered by the Swedes during the Deluge and Great Northern War, and by the Russians during the Seven Years' War.

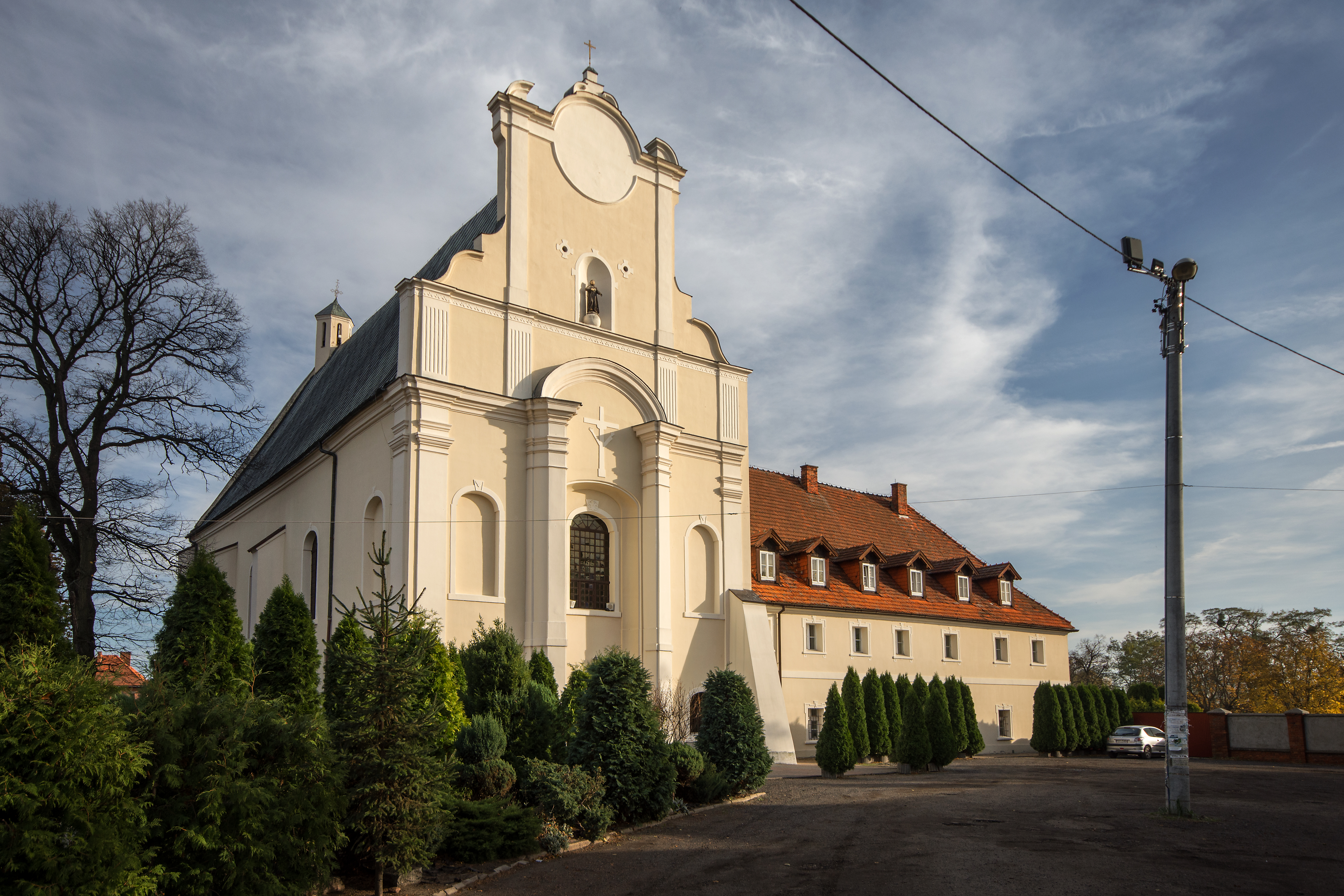
Baroque Franciscan monastery

After the Second Partition of Poland, in 1793 it was annexed by Prussia. Following the successful Greater Poland uprising of 1806, it was regained by Poles and included in the short-lived Duchy of Warsaw, in 1815 it was re-annexed by Prussia. Four annual fairs were held in Kobylin in the mid-19th century. Local Poles took part in the Greater Poland uprising (1918–19), after which Kobylin was integrated with Poland, shortly after it regained independence.

During World War II Kobylin was under German occupation from September 1939 to January 1945. The Germans expelled the Polish population to the General Government in the more eastern part of occupied Poland or imprisoned in Nazi concentration camps. In November 1939, the Germans murdered six Poles from Biadki in the nearby forest. The Germans also set up a camp for children taken from orphanages from Greater Poland and Pomerania (see Kidnapping of children by Nazi Germany). A local Polish policeman was murdered by the Russians in the Katyn massacre in 1940. The Polish resistance was active in Kobylin. The Grey Ranks printed and distributed Polish underground press there.

== Demographics ==
Historical population

Year	Pop.	±%
1811	1,719	—
1837	2,226	+29.5%
1871	2,366	+6.3%
1880	2,418	+2.2%
1890	2,223	−8.1%

Year	Pop.	±%
1900	2,208	−0.7%
1910	2,329	+5.5%
1921	2,172	−6.7%
1931	2,359	+8.6%
1939	2,600	+10.2%

Year	Pop.	±%
1950	2,302	−11.5%
1960	2,223	−3.4%
2010	3,130	+40.8%

== Transport ==
Kobylin lies on national road 36.

Kobylin has a station on the Leszno-Krotoszyn railway line.
