= Zduny =

- Town
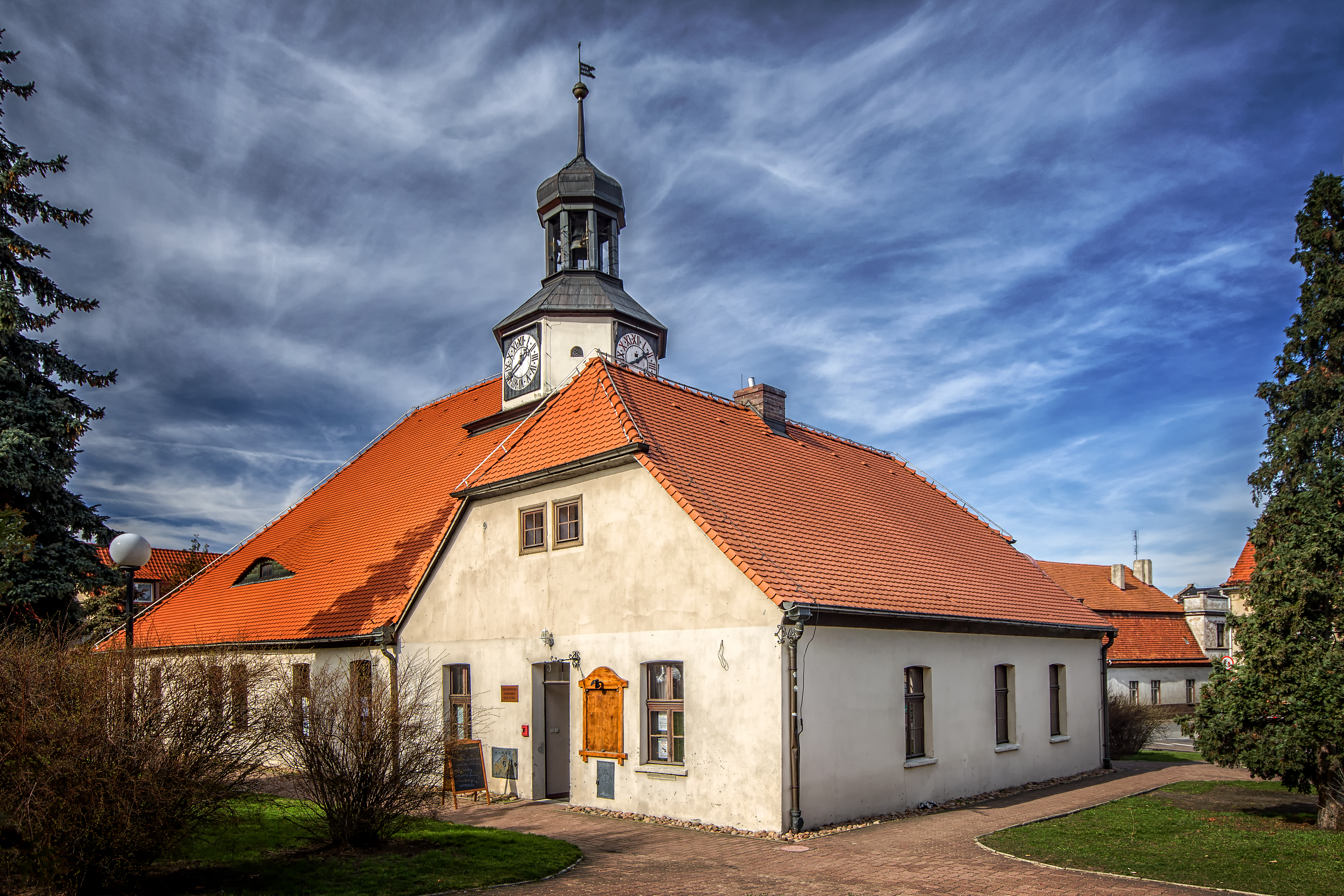
- Town Hall from 1684

- Flag Coat of arms

- Location within Poland
- Coordinates: 51°38′47″N 17°22′40″E
- Country: Poland
- Voivodeship: Greater Poland
- County: Krotoszyn
- Gmina: Zduny

Area
  - Total: 6.12 km^{2} (2.36 sq mi)
- Highest elevation: 1,579 m (5,180 ft)
- Lowest elevation: 11,912 m (39,081 ft)

Population (2011)
  - Total: 4,551
  - Density: 744/km^{2} (1,930/sq mi)
- Time zone: UTC+1 (CET)
  - Summer (DST): UTC+2 (CEST)
- Postal code: 63-760
- Area code: (+48) 62
- Vehicle registration: PKR
- Climate: Oceanic climate
- Website: http://www.zduny.pl

Zduny ([ˈzdunɨ]) is a town in west-central Poland, in Krotoszyn County in the Greater Poland Voivodeship, with 4,551 inhabitants as of 2011.

== Location ==
Zduny lies in western part of Kalisz Upland, about 7 kilometres (4 mi) from Krotoszyn and about 39 km (24 mi) from Ostrów Wielkopolski. The town has two major outside connections:

- national road 15: Trzebnica-Zduny-Krotoszyn-Gniezno-Inowrocław-Toruń-Brodnica-Ostróda,
- rail line Wrocław-Oleśnica-Zduny-Krotoszyn-Gniezno

== History ==
Following the joint German-Soviet invasion of Poland, which started World War II in September 1939, the town was occupied by Germany until 1945. In 1943, the occupiers renamed it Treustädt in attempt to erase traces of Polish origin.

From 1975 to 1998, it was administratively located in the Kalisz Voivodeship.

== Demographics ==
Historical population

Year	Pop.	±%
1810	3,251	—
1843	3,406	+4.8%
1871	3,346	−1.8%
1880	3,323	−0.7%
1890	3,477	+4.6%
1900	3,514	+1.1%
1910	3,431	−2.4%

Year	Pop.	±%
1921	2,825	−17.7%
1931	3,403	+20.5%
1939	3,437	+1.0%
1950	2,649	−22.9%
1960	3,287	+24.1%
2010	4,514	+37.3%

== Notable residents ==
- Richard Friedrich Johannes Pfeiffer (1858–1945), German physician and bacteriologist
