= Bożacin, Greater Poland Voivodeship =

Bożacin
- Village
- Location within Poland
- Coordinates: 51°44′8″N 17°25′38″E
- Country: Poland
- Voivodeship: Greater Poland
- County: Krotoszyn
- Gmina: Krotoszyn

Bożacin [bɔˈʐat͡ɕin] is a village in the administrative district of Gmina Krotoszyn, within Krotoszyn County, Greater Poland Voivodeship, in west-central Poland.
