= Rochy, Poland =

Rochy
- Settlement
- Location within Poland
- Coordinates: 51°39′34″N 17°17′53″E
- Country: Poland
- Voivodeship: Greater Poland
- County: Krotoszyn
- Gmina: Zduny

Rochy [ˈrɔxɨ] is a settlement in the administrative district of Gmina Zduny, within Krotoszyn County, Greater Poland Voivodeship, in west-central Poland.
