= Swedish Medical Society =

Swedish physicians' society

The Swedish Medical Society (also known as the Swedish Society of Medicine, Swedish: Svenska Läkaresällskapet) is an independent and scientific professional organization formed by Swedish physicians, including doctors from all medical specialties. Its aims are the promotion of research, education, and quality in health care.

The Society awards its Pasteur medal every ten years to a scientist who has made significant contributions to bacteriology or hygiene. The original medal was presented to Louis Pasteur on his birthday in 1892, and the decadal award began in 1900.

== Organization ==
The society was founded in 1808 by Jacob Berzelius, Jonas Henrik Gistrén, Erik Gadelius, Anders Johan Hagströmer, Carl Fredrik von Schulzenheim, Eric Carl Trafvenfelt, and Henrik Gahn. The organization is one of the oldest of its kind in Europe. Full membership is open to those who have graduated in medicine in a Nordic country, have graduated in medicine elsewhere and are licensed to practise in Sweden, or hold a doctorate at a medical faculty in Sweden.

In 2022, there were over 20,000 members.
