= Roszki =

- Village
- Location within Poland
- Coordinates: 51°44′31″N 17°35′58″E
- Country: Poland
- Voivodeship: Greater Poland
- County: Krotoszyn
- Gmina: Krotoszyn
- Population: 606

Roszki [ˈrɔʂki] is a village in the administrative district of Gmina Krotoszyn, within Krotoszyn County, Greater Poland Voivodeship, in west-central Poland.
