= Bacteriolysin =

Class of substances which dissolve bacterial cell walls

One of the serum substances which is part of the dissolution process of bacteria, the enzymes will promote the dissolution of the bacterial cell wall and cause the death of the bacteria.

Bacteriolysin probably functions by deregulating lipoteichoic acid (LTA) in Gram-positive bacteria and phospholipids in Gram-negative bacteria.

== See also ==
- Immune system
- Immunity
- Polyclonal response
