= Michał Kozal =

Polish Roman Catholic bishop (1893–1943)

Blessed Bishop Michał Kozal
- Auxiliary Bishop of Włocławek
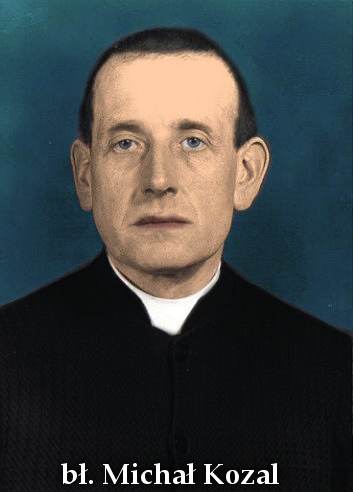
- Church: Roman Catholic Church
- Diocese: Włocławek
- See: Włocławek
- Appointed: 10 June 1939
- Term ended: 26 January 1943
- Other post: Titular Bishop of Lappa (1939–1943)

Orders
- Ordination: 23 February 1918 by Wilhelm Atanazy Kloske
- Consecration: 13 August 1939 by Karol Mieczysław Radoński
- Rank: Bishop

Personal details
- Born: Michał Kozal; 27 September 1893 Nowy Folwark, Krotoszyn, Congress Poland
- Died: 26 January 1943 (aged 49) Dachau, Oberbayern, Nazi Germany

Sainthood
- Feast day: 26 January
- Venerated in: Roman Catholic Church
- Beatified: 14 June 1987; Wielkopolskie, Poland by Pope John Paul II
- Attributes: Episcopal attire
- Patronage: Włocławek; Krotoszyn; Diocese of Bydgoszcz

Michał Kozal (27 September 1893 – 26 January 1943) was a Polish Roman Catholic bishop. Kozal was noted for his intelligence and dedication to studies and studied to become a priest during World War I, which disrupted his studies but did not prevent his ordination in 1918; he gained fame for his abilities and rose to several positions that superiors endowed upon him all culminating in being named a Monsignor in 1932 and then appointed to the episcopate in 1939 just before World War II started. But his pastoral mission as a bishop did not last long since the Nazi forces arrested and tortured him and sent him to Dachau where he died after being injected with a lethal substance.

His beatification was celebrated in Poland on 14 June 1987 after Pope John Paul II had made his apostolic visit to that nation.

== Life ==
Kozal was born on 27 September 1893 in Congress Poland to the peasants Jan Kozal and Marianna Płaczek. His father married in 1888 to his mother, who was widowed with five children at the time; Kozal had six siblings, including brother Wojciech, who participated in the Greater Poland Uprising and the Polish-Bolshevik War, in which he was killed at Grodno in 1920.

Kozal commenced his education on 27 April 1905 at Krotoszyn and at one stage participated in a student strike to take action against the forced Germanization and the forced teaching of the German language. He passed his examinations in 1914 and was offered further studies but rejected the offer to instead pursue a path to the priesthood first in Poznań and then in Gniezno for theological and philosophical studies. Kozal was ordained to the priesthood in the Gniezno Cathedral in 1918. On 1 June 1920 he was appointed as the administrator of the Saint Nicholas parish until 1923 and around this time collaborated with the Catholic Action movement and the Polish Red Cross. Cardinal Edmund Dalbor – in 1923 – moved him to Białośliwiu as a parish priest and that April served as a catechist and teacher as well. Cardinal August Hlond – on 1 November 1927 – placed him in a leadership position at Gniezno in addition to serving as a theological and liturgical studies professor; he was appointed as the rector on 25 September 1929. In 1932 he became titled as a Monsignor after Cardinal Hlond sought papal approval for this.

On 10 June 1939, Pope Pius XII appointed him as the Titular Bishop of Lappa and the Auxiliary Bishop of Włocławek, and he received his episcopal consecration as such the following 13 August in the Włocławek Cathedral. The outbreak of World War II saw him tend to the wounded victims and those who were displaced due to the war and the Polish invasion; he was expelled from his diocese when the Germans arrived on 14 September 1939, and one German warned him to leave lest he risk being killed. The Gestapo called him and a fellow priest forward in October 1939 and instructed them to preach in German, but both refused; both said German was not well understood among the people, so the Gestapo ordered sermons to be submitted for translation, but again the two refused to do this.

The Gestapo arrested him and 44 other priests and seminarians on 7 November 1939, and he was tortured and jailed in his diocese; he was later moved to Lad before being sent to both Szczeglin and Berlin before the fatal transfer to Dachau, from which he would never again leave. He was locked in confinement where the guards tried to break his resolve when banging on the doors with the butts of their rifles. On 16 January 1940 he was relocated to a Cistercian convent turned camp for a brief imprisonment and suffered frostbite on his ears and nose during the cold in his transfer; he was there until 3 April 1941 when moved to Inowrocław. It was there he was beaten upon arrival, and his first interrogation saw him suffer an inflamed ear due to the severe torture; he received the prisoner number 24544 on 25 April 1941. Kozal never shirked from his duties and spent his time in imprisonment ministering to fellow prisoners despite extensive abuse he received from the guards at the camp.

Kozal suffered from typhoid, and his situation grew worse on 17 January 1943; on 26 January the Nazi doctor Joseph Sneiss gave him a lethal injection of phenol in his right arm, and his remains were cremated in the camp's crematorium on 30 January. His death was announced on Polish radio on 1 February. Kozal's paternal cousin Ceslao was also a prisoner and heard the words Sneiss said to the bishop before his murder: "Now the way to eternity will be easier".

== Beatification ==
The beatification process commenced under Pope John XXIII on 8 October 1960, and Kozal became titled as a Servant of God as a result; Cardinal Stefan Wyszyński opened the informative process on 8 October 1960, and this process later closed on 29 August 1964 with the Congregation for the Causes of Saints later validating the process on 27 September 1986 and receiving the Positio in 1987. Theologians approved the cause on 24 March 1987, as did the C.C.S. on 28 April 1987. On 8 May 1987 he was confirmed to have died "in odium fidei" (in hatred of the faith), and so Pope John Paul II approved the beatification. John Paul II beatified Bishop Kozal during his visit to Poland on 14 June 1987.

Kozal has been the patron for Włocławek since 8 October 2002 and the patron for Krotoszyn since 9 June 2013. Since 2004 he has been the co-patron for the diocese of Bydgoszcz.
