= Pasteur Medal (Swedish) =

Honorable medal

The Pasteur Medal is given every ten years by the Swedish Society of Medicine (SSM) to a scientist who has excelled in the fields of bacteriology or hygiene. It first was struck and given to its honorand Louis Pasteur on the occasion of his 70th birthday in 1892. The Yale Art Gallery mischaracterizes the bronze medallion as French. The medal was designed by Frenchman Victor Peter (1840–1918).
