= Sulmierzyce =

Town in Greater Poland Voivodeship, Poland

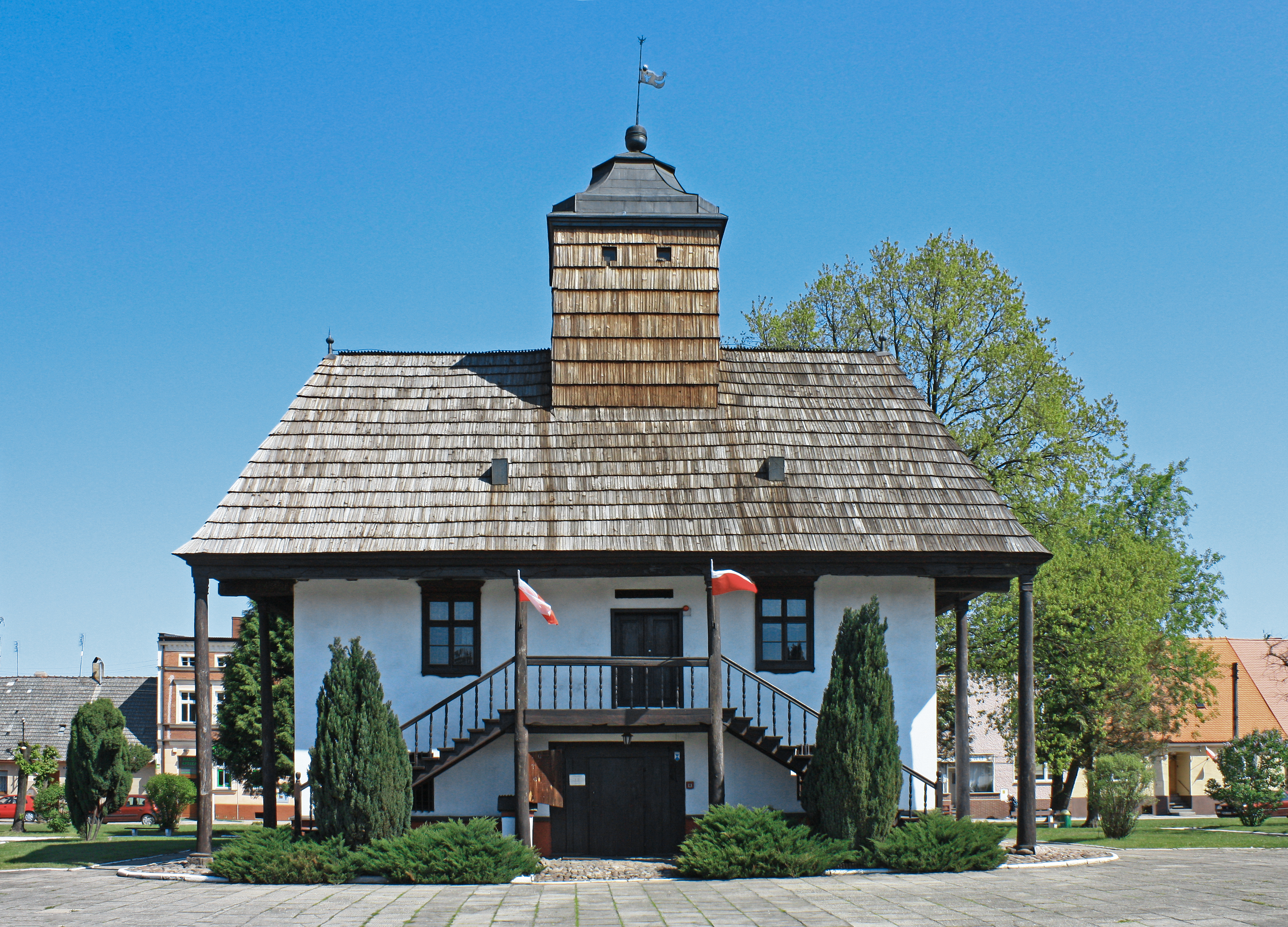
- Town hall

- Coat of arms

- Location within Poland
- Coordinates: 51°36′N 17°32′E
- Country: Poland
- Voivodeship: Greater Poland
- County: Krotoszyn
- Gmina: Sulmierzyce (urban gmina)
- First mentioned: 1420
- Town rights: 1457

Area
  - Total: 28.98 km^{2} (11.19 sq mi)

Population (2010)
  - Total: 2,859
  - Density: 98.65/km^{2} (255.5/sq mi)
- Postal code: 63-750
- Vehicle registration: PKR
- Climate: Cfb
- Website: http://www.sulmierzyce.pl

Sulmierzyce ([sulmʲɛˈʐɨt͡sɛ]) is a town in Krotoszyn County, Greater Poland Voivodeship, in south-central Poland.

It is the birthplace of Polish poet Sebastian Klonowic, also known as Acernus.

The town contains the sole preserved wooden historic town hall in Poland.

== History ==
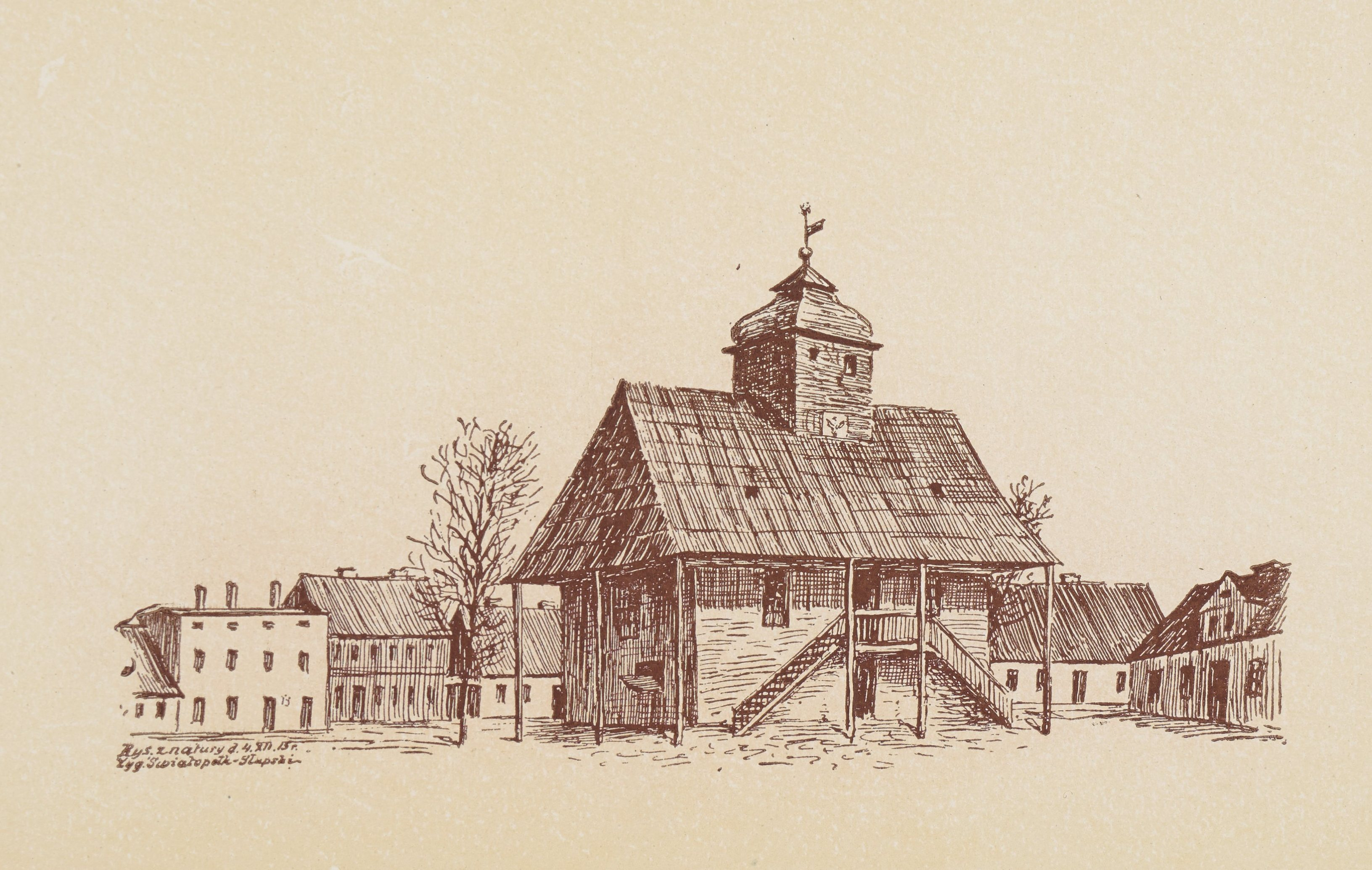
Early 20th-century drawing of the town hall

The oldest mention of Sulmierzyce comes from 1420. It was granted town rights in 1457 by King Casimir IV Jagiellon thanks to efforts of starost of Odolanów Mikołaj Gruszczyński. It was a royal town of the Kingdom of Poland, administratively located in the Kalisz County in the Kalisz Voivodeship in the Greater Poland Province. The 1st Polish National Cavalry Brigade was stationed in the town.

Following the German-Soviet invasion of Poland, which started World War II in September 1939, the town was occupied by Germany until 1945.

In 1972, town rights were revoked, but after protests of local citizens were quickly restored.

== Demographics ==
Historical population

Year	Pop.	±%
1910	2,807	—
1921	2,526	−10.0%
1931	2,476	−2.0%
1939	2,408	−2.7%

Year	Pop.	±%
1950	1,929	−19.9%
1960	2,061	+6.8%
2010	2,859	+38.7%
