= Krotoszyn County =

Krotoszyn County Powiat krotoszyński
- County
- Flag Coat of arms

- Location within the voivodeship
- Coordinates (Krotoszyn): 51°41′N 17°26′E
- Country: Poland
- Voivodeship: Greater Poland
- Seat: Krotoszyn
- Gminas: Total 6 (incl. 1 urban): Sulmierzyce; Gmina Kobylin; Gmina Koźmin Wielkopolski; Gmina Krotoszyn; Gmina Rozdrażew; Gmina Zduny

Area
  - Total: 714.23 km^{2} (275.77 sq mi)

Population (2006)
  - Total: 77,092
  - Density: 107.94/km^{2} (279.56/sq mi)
  - Urban: 46,482
  - Rural: 30,610
- Car plates: PKR
- Website: www.starostwo.krotoszyn.pl

Krotoszyn County (Polish: powiat krotoszyński) is a unit of territorial administration and local government (powiat) in Greater Poland Voivodeship, west-central Poland. It came into being on January 1, 1999, as a result of the Polish local government reforms passed in 1998. Its administrative seat and largest town is Krotoszyn, which lies 88 kilometres (55 mi) south-east of the regional capital Poznań. The county contains four other towns: Koźmin Wielkopolski, 16 km (10 mi) north of Krotoszyn, Zduny, 6 km (4 mi) south-west of Krotoszyn, Kobylin, 14 km (9 mi) west of Krotoszyn, and Sulmierzyce, 12 km (7 mi) south-east of Krotoszyn.

The county covers an area of 714.23 square kilometres (275.8 sq mi). As of 2006 its total population is 77,092, out of which the population of Krotoszyn is 29,421, that of Koźmin Wielkopolski is 6,707, that of Zduny is 4,498, that of Kobylin is 3,084, that of Sulmierzyce is 2,772, and the rural population is 30,610.

== Neighbouring counties ==
Krotoszyn County is bordered by Jarocin County to the north, Pleszew County to the north-east, Ostrów County to the east, Milicz County to the south, Rawicz County to the west and Gostyń County to the north-west.

== Administrative divisions ==
The county is subdivided into six gminas (one urban, four urban-rural and one rural). These are listed in the following table, in descending order of population.

Gmina	Type	Area (km^{2})	Population (2006)	Seat
Gmina Krotoszyn	urban-rural	255.5	40,360	Krotoszyn
Gmina Koźmin Wielkopolski	urban-rural	152.7	13,820	Koźmin Wielkopolski
Gmina Kobylin	urban-rural	112.4	8,039	Kobylin
Gmina Zduny	urban-rural	85.2	6,946	Zduny
Gmina Rozdrażew	rural	79.5	5,155	Rozdrażew
Sulmierzyce	urban	29.0	2,772	
