= Leib =

- Gender: Male
- Language: Yiddish

Origin
- Meaning: Lion
- Region of origin: Europe

Leib is a given name, and (less often) a surname usually of Jewish origin. Leib often stems from לייב (leib), the Yiddish word for Hebrew "heart" לב (lev, leb) and with the diminutives Leibel/Leibl and Leibele, or from the Yiddish word for "lion". The Standard German word for lion is Löwe; other – partly dialectal – German forms of the word are Löw, Loew, Löb, Leb and Leib.

== Surnames derived from the name ==
"Leib" may itself be a surname. There are a number of patronymic surnames derived from the name and its variants based on East Slavic patronymic suffix -ich/-icz.

- Labovich, Lebovitz, Leibovich, Leibovici, Leibovitch/Leybovitch, Leibovitz
- Lebowitz, Leibowitz, Lejbowicz, Libowitz, Liebowitz

== Given name ==
- Aryeh Leib, multiple persons
- Leyb ben Oyzer (died 1727), shamash ha-kehilla (beadle or sexton of the congregation), trustee, and secretary or notary, of the Jewish community in Amsterdam
- Isaac Leib Goldberg (1860–1935), Lithuanian-Israeli Zionist leader and philanthropist
- Leib Gurwicz (1906–1982), Lithuanian-British rabbi
- Leib Kvitko (1890–1952), Soviet poet
- Leib Langfus (died 1944), Polish rabbi and Auschwitz victim
- Yehuda Leib Maimon (1875–1962), Israeli rabbi
- Leib Milstein (Lewis Milestone, 1895–1980), Moldovan-American film director
- Yehudah Leib Pinsker (Leon Pinsker, 1821–1891), Polish political activist and physician
- Leib Sarah's (Aryeh Leib the son of Sarah, 1730–1796), rabbi
- Aharon Yehuda Leib Shteinman (1913–2017), Israeli rabbi
- Zalman Leib Teitelbaum (born 1951), American rabbi
- Leib Tropper (born 1950), American rabbi
- Leib Weissberg (1893–1942), Croatian rabbi
- Leib Yaffe (died 1948), Israeli poet and journalist

== Surname ==
- Ethan Leib (born 1975), American law professor
- Gary Leib (1955–2021), American cartoonist and animator
- Günther Leib (1927–2024), German baritone and voice professor
- Michael Leib (1760–1822), American politician
- Georg Leib (1846–1910), Royal Councillor of Commerce and German philanthropist
