= Aryeh Leib =

Jewish given name

Aryeh-Leib (אריה־לייב) or Aryeh Loeb is a bilingual pleonasmic Jewish name doublet, literally 'lion-lion', traceable back to the Hebrew word אריה arye 'lion' and the Middle High German word lewe 'lion'. Notable people with the name include:

- Yehudah Aryeh Leib Alter (1847–1905), Polish rabbi
- Aryeh Leib Baron
- Aryeh Leib ben Asher Gunzberg (c. 1695–1785), Lithuanian rabbi and author
- Aryeh Leib ben Moses Zuenz (c. 1768–1833), Polish rabbi
- Aryeh Leib ben Sarah
- Aryeh Leib ben Saul (c. 1690–1755), Polish rabbi
- Judah Aryeh Loeb ben Zvi Hirsch of Carpentras or Judah Aryeh ben Zvi Hirsch
- Aryeh Leib Bernstein
- Aryeh Leib Dulchin (Arieh Dulzin, 1913–1989) Soviet and Israeli Zionist activist and politician
- Aryeh Leib Epstein (1708–1775), Polish rabbi
- Aryeh Leib Heller
- Yaakov Yehuda Aryeh Leib Frenkel (died 1940), Hungarian rabbi
- Aryeh Leib Frumkin (1845–1916), Lithuanian rabbi
- Aryeh Leib HaCohen Heller (1745–1812), Polish rabbi
- Aryeh Leib Malin (1906–1962), Polish-American rabbi
- Aryeh Leib Motzkin
- Aryeh Leib Schochet (1845–1928), Russian-American rabbi
- Aryeh Leib Shifman
- Aryeh Leib of Shpola
- Aryeh Leib Yaffe
- Aryeh Leib Yellin (1820–1886), Polish rabbi

== See also ==
- ben Aryeh Leib
