= Lebovici =

Lebovici is a surname of Jewish origin, occurring mainly in France. Notable people with the surname include:

- Élisabeth Lebovici (born 1953), French art historian, journalist, and art critic
- Gérard Lebovici (1932–1984), French book publisher, film producer and impresario
- Serge Lebovici (1915–2000), French psychiatrist and psychoanalyst, father of Élisabeth

== See also ==
- Leibovici, people with this name
