= Paul Brodek =

Jewish Polish-German Politician

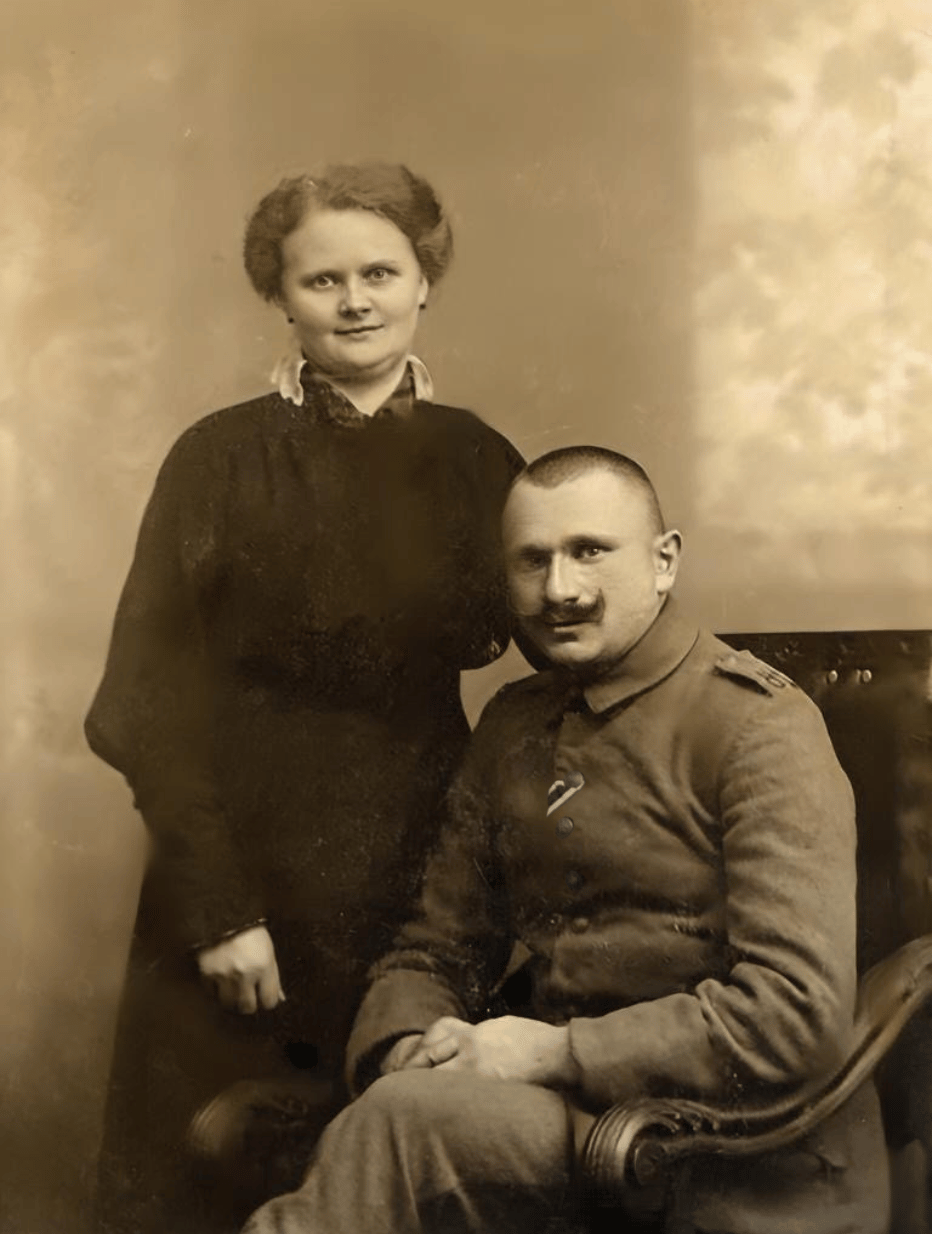
- Paul Brodek and his wife after WWI
- Born: October 16, 1884; Krotoszyn, Poland
- Died: September 5, 1942 (aged 57); Brake, Germany
- Cause of death: Inhumane treatment at a concentration camp
- Resting place: Brake, Germany
- Occupation: Politician
- Political party: SDP
- Spouse: Frieda Berhardine Cacilie Seggermann
- Children: Hans Diedrich Brodek
- Parents: David Brodek (father); Dorothea Israel (mother)

Paul Brodek (October 16, 1884 – September 5, 1942) was a German politician who served in the Oldenburg state Parliament as a member of the Social Democratic Party of Germany.

Of Jewish origin, Brodek was born in Krotoschin, Posen district, West Prussia. After finishing school, he began a commercial apprenticeship and began training in Berlin and came to Brake, Germany in 1910 as a sailor and trade unionist, where he later worked as a dock and warehouse porter. He took part in World War I, but was wounded in 1917 and awarded the Eisernes Kreuz (Iron Cross) and then worked for Thyssen in Mülheim an der Ruhr. After his return to Brake he was elected to the Workers' and Soldiers' Council for Bremen. In 1919 he became the director of employment records in Brake, and in 1931 the head of the Wesermünde – Bremerhaven employment office.

During the Weimar Republic, Paul was a member of the council and magistrate of the city of Brake. From 1923 to 1931 he was a member of the Oldenburg state parliament. The Weimar Republic fell to the Nazi regime short after.

In 1938, Brodek was sent to a 'Jew house' in Brake and then moved to Bremen. Following the November pogroms, he was taken into "protective custody" and deported to the Sachsenhausen concentration camp. After his release, he worked as a laborer in Bremen. In 1941 he was imprisoned again, probably in the Farge concentration camp. He was released from there because of his inhumane treatment and died soon afterwards on September 5, 1942.

A street was named after him and a plaque was mounted on his old house. He is buried in the Friedhof Brake (Brake cemetery)

Paul Brodek's Family Tree

Philippine Rawitscher	Leopold L. H. Sammel Brodek
Dorothea Israel	David Brodek	Rosalie Brodek
Emil Brodek	Paul Brodek	Johanna Brodek	Benno Brodek
