= Libowitz =

Libowitz is a surname. Notable people with the surname include:

== People ==
- Nehemiah Samuel Libowitz (1862–1939), Hebrew scholar and author
- Sig Libowitz (born 1968), American lawyer and actor

== Fictional characters ==
- Mr. Libowitz, one of the characters in the movie 3 Strikes (film)

== See also ==
- Surnames from the name Leib
