= Leibovici =

Leibovici is a surname, originating in a typical Romanian spelling of the Russian Jewish "Leibovich". Notable people with the surname include:

- Eren Eyüboğlu (born Ernestine Leibovici; 1913–1988), Romanian-Turkish painter and mosaic artist
- Karen Leibovici (born 1952), Canadian politician
- Karen Leibovici (sailor) (born 1971), French sailor
- Margaret Kelly Leibovici (1910–2004), Irish dancer
- Lucian Raicu (born Bernard Leibovici; 1934–2006), Romanian literary critic and columnist

== See also ==
- Surnames from the name Leib
