= Ben Aryeh Leib =

ben Aryeh Leib is a patronymic appellation or surname derived from the given name Aryeh Leib. Notable people with this name include:

- David ben Aryeh Leib
- Zechariah Mendel ben Aryeh Leib
