= Lebowitz =

Lebowitz is a surname, and may refer to:

== People ==
- Arieh Lebowitz (born 1954), Executive Director of the Jewish Labor Committee
- Baruch Ber Lebowitz (1862 - 1939), Belarusian Talmudic scholar
- Fischl Lebowitz, birth name of Fred Lebow (1932–1994), founder of the New York City Marathon
- Fran Lebowitz (born 1950), American writer known for her sardonic social commentary
- Joel Lebowitz (born 1930), mathematical physicist
- Mike Lebowitz (born 1977), American attorney and expert in the field of military law
- Rachel Lebowitz (born 1975), Canadian writer

=== Also ===
- Mike Lebovitz, stand-up comedian

== Fictional characters ==
- Fawn Lebowitz, a minor character in a Victorious episode named "Crazy Ponnie" played by Jennette McCurdy

== See also ==
- Surnames from the name Leib
