= Leibowitz =

Leibowitz is a Jewish surname. Notable people with the surname include:

- Barry Leibowitz (born 1945), American-Israeli basketball player
- Henoch Leibowitz (c.1918–2008), head of the Rabbinical Seminary of America
- Herschel Leibowitz (1925–2011), American researcher into visual perception
- Jacob Leibowitz or Jakub Lejbowicz, possible birth name of Jacob Frank (1726–1791), leader of a Jewish messianic movement
- Jon Leibowitz (born 1958), former United States Federal Trade Commission chairman
- Jon Stewart (born 1962 as Jonathan Stuart Leibowitz), American political satirist, formerly of The Daily Show
- Martin L. Leibowitz, financial researcher and business leader
- Nechama Leibowitz (1905–1997), sometimes Nehama Leibowitz, Israeli Bible scholar
- René Leibowitz (1913–1972), French composer of Polish-Latvian origin
- Ronnie Leibowitz (born 1953), Israeli bank robber, also known as "Ofnobank"
- Samuel Leibowitz (1893–1978), New York trial lawyer
- Yeshayahu Leibowitz (1903–1994), Israeli thinker and scientist

== Fictional characters ==
- Fawn Leibowitz, a fictional character mentioned in the film Animal House
- Fawn Leibowitz, a fictional character in the Nickelodeon sitcom Victorious
- Isaac Edward Leibowitz, a fictional character in the novel A Canticle for Leibowitz
- Maya, Francis, Randall, and Barry Leibowitz-Jenkins, a fictional family in the animated series The Proud Family: Louder and Prouder

== See also ==
- Surnames from the name Leib
