= Leibovich =

Leibovich is a surname. Notable people with the surname include:

- Adam Leibovich (born 1970), American physicist
- Avital Leibovich, Director of the American Jewish Committee (AJC) in Israel
- Mark Leibovich (born 1965), American journalist and author
- Maya Leibovich, the first native-born female rabbi in Israel

== See also ==
- Surnames from the name Leib
