= Krotoszyn =

Town in Greater Poland Voivodeship, Poland

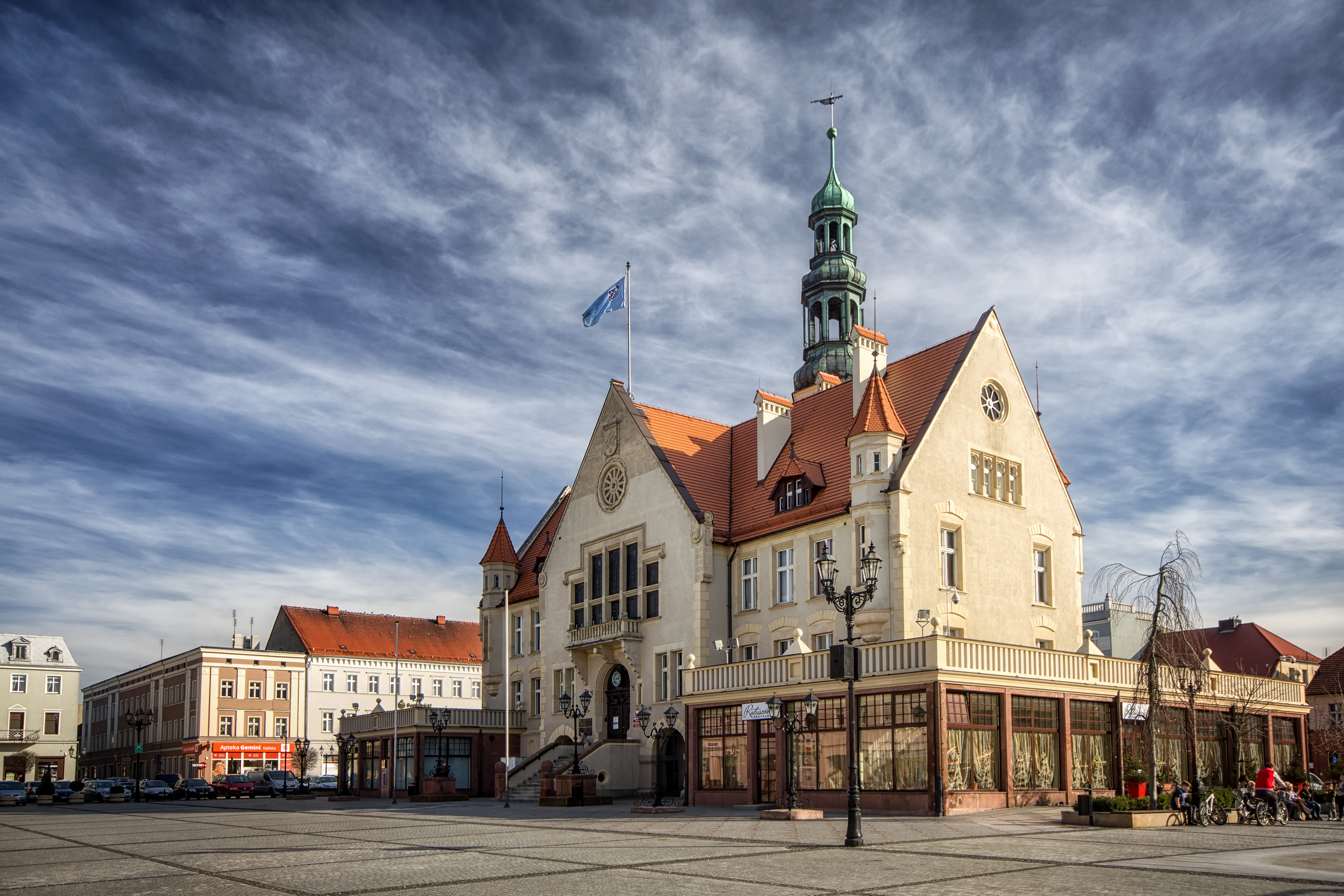
- Town Hall

- Flag Coat of arms

- Location within Poland
- Coordinates: 51°41′N 17°26′E
- Country: Poland
- Voivodeship: Greater Poland
- County: Krotoszyn
- Gmina: Krotoszyn
- Established: 15th century
- Town rights: 1415

Government
  - Mayor: Natalia Robakowska

Area
  - Total: 23 km^{2} (8.9 sq mi)
- Highest elevation: 140 m (460 ft)
- Lowest elevation: 130 m (430 ft)

Population (2024)
  - Total: 26,775
  - Density: 1,200/km^{2} (3,000/sq mi)
- Time zone: UTC+1 (CET)
  - Summer (DST): UTC+2 (CEST)
- Postal code: 63–700 to 63–710
- Area code: +48 62
- Vehicle registration: PKR
- Climate: Cfb
- Website: http://www.krotoszyn.pl

Krotoszyn (Polish pronunciation: [krɔˈtɔʂɨn]) is a town in west-central Poland with 26 775 inhabitants as of 2024. It is the seat of Krotoszyn County in the Greater Poland Voivodeship.

Founded in the late medieval period, Krotoszyn prospered as a regional center of trade and crafts located at the intersection of important trade routes. The town features heritage sites in a variety of styles, including Gothic, Baroque and Neo-Renaissance, a preserved market square and a regional museum.

== History ==
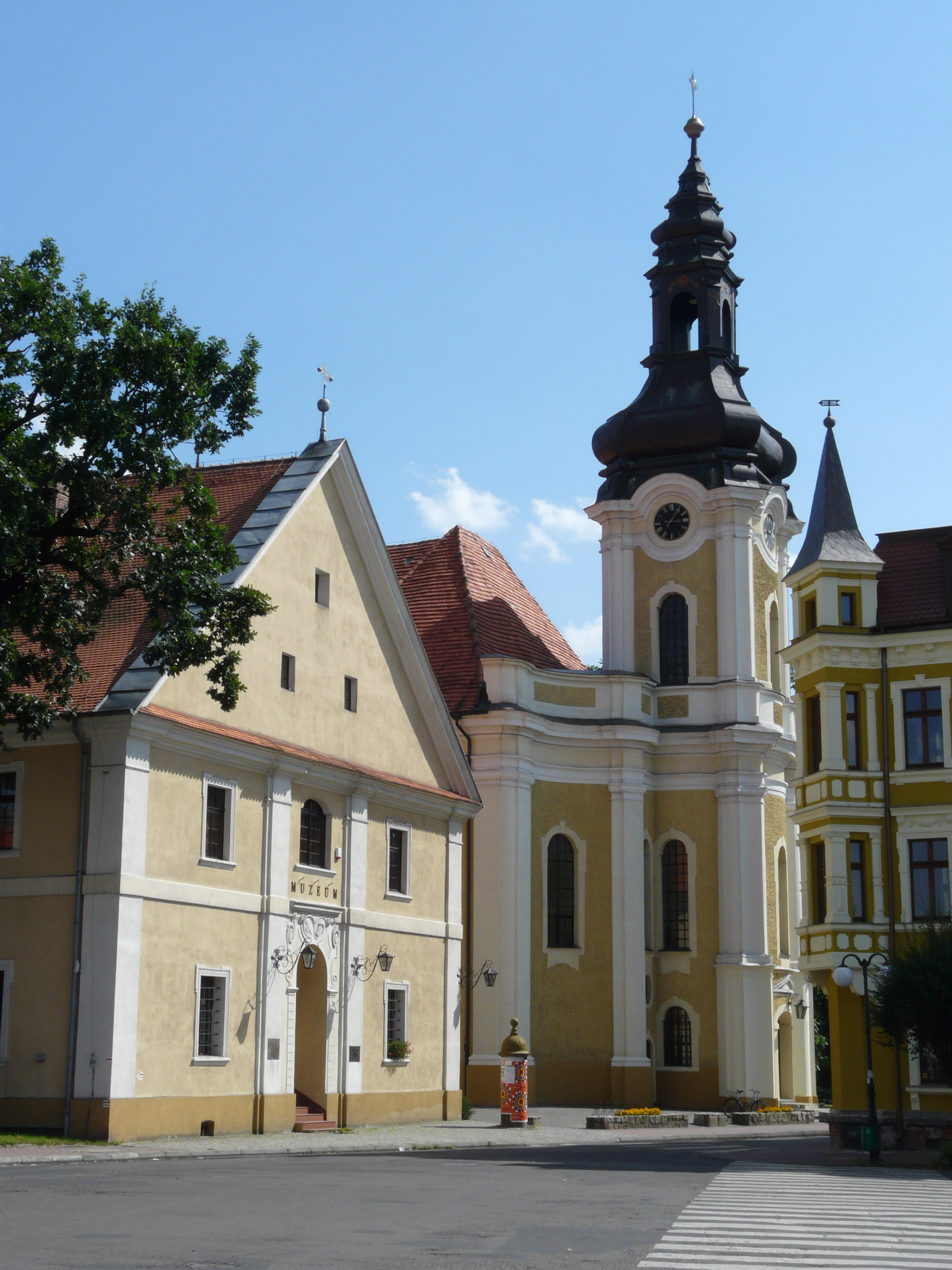
Regional Museum and Baroque Church of Saints Peter and Paul

Krotoszyn was founded by local nobleman Wierzbięta Krotoski, participant of the Battle of Grunwald, and was granted town rights in 1415 by King Władysław II Jagiełło. It was a private town owned by the Krotoski, Niewieski, Rozdrażewski and Potocki families, historically located in the Kalisz Voivodeship in the Greater Poland Province. After the town suffered a fire in 1453, King Casimir IV of Poland vested it with new privileges, establishing a weekly market and three annual fairs.

It developed as a regional center of trade and crafts, located at the intersection of the Kalisz–Głogów and Toruń–Wrocław trade routes. During the Thirty Years' War, in 1628, Protestant refugees from German states settled in the town. It was plundered by the Swedes, during the Swedish invasion of Poland in 1656, but soon recovered and famous fairs were held there.

It was annexed by Prussia in 1793 during the Second Partition of Poland. After the successful Greater Poland uprising of 1806, it was regained by Poles and included within the short-lived Duchy of Warsaw. In 1815 it was re-annexed by Prussia, and in 1871 it subsequently became part of Germany. During the German rule in the 19th century, the town was located in the Prussian province of Posen. The castle of Krotoszyn was the centre of a mediatised principality formed in 1819 out of the holdings of the Prussian crown and granted to the prince of Thurn und Taxis in compensation for his relinquishing control over the Prussian postal system and it was subjected to Germanisation. Famous Polish composer Fryderyk Chopin stopped in the town in 1829. During the Polish Greater Poland uprising (1848) Germans and Jews attacked the local Polish committee, and the Poles had to move their activities to Koźmin Wielkopolski. Poles captured in Pogrzybów were held by the Prussians in Krotoszyn before being imprisoned in Kostrzyn nad Odrą. Edmund Taczanowski was held in the local military hospital. Later on, despite the Germanisation policies, Poles established a number of organizations, including an industrial society, a cooperative bank and a local branch of the "Sokół" Polish Gymnastic Society.

Many inhabitants took part in the Greater Poland uprising (1918–19), during which the town was liberated by the insurgents on 1 January 1919, nearly two months after Poland regained its independence.

=== World War II ===
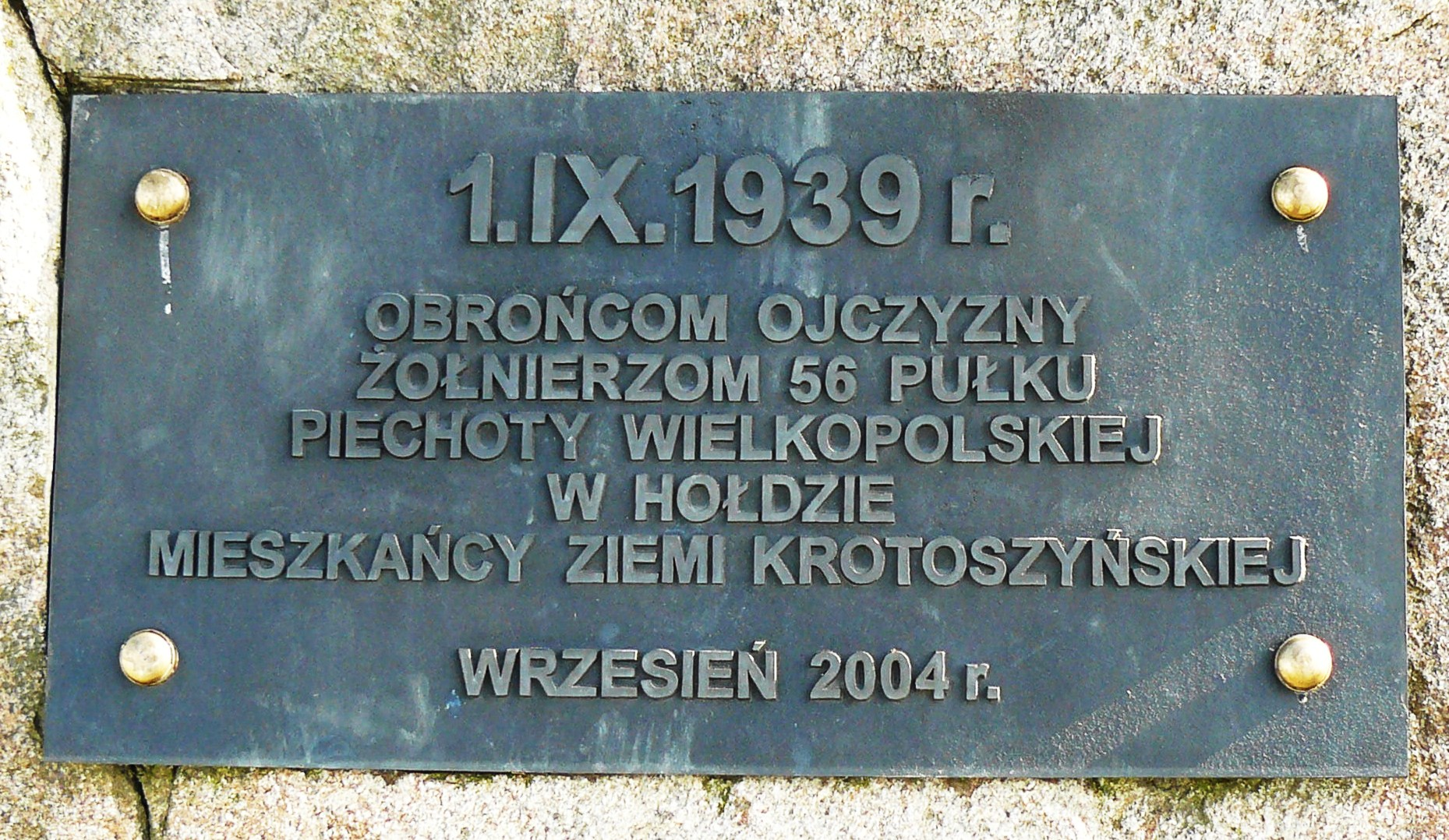
Monument to Polish soldiers who fought in defense of Krotoszyn in 1939

The Germans attacked Krotoszyn on 1 September 1939, the first day of the invasion of Poland and World War II. On 2 September they bombed a train with Polish civilians fleeing the Wehrmacht from Krotoszyn, killing 300 people and on 3 September they captured the town. The Germans established a transit camp for Polish prisoners of war and over 4,500 Polish soldiers passed through the camp. In mid-September 1939, the Einsatzgruppe VI entered the town to commit various crimes against the Polish population.

During the German occupation the Polish population was subjected to mass arrests, Germanisation policies, discrimination, expulsions, executions and deportations to forced labour in Germany. Poles from Krotoszyn, including several local policemen and the town's deputy mayor, as well as several alumni of local schools, were also murdered by the Russians in the large Katyn massacre in April–May 1940. The Germans destroyed the memorial dedicated to local Polish insurgents of 1918–1919, while another monument plaque was hidden by Poles and thus preserved. Germany also established and operated a Nazi prison and two forced labour subcamps of the Stalag XXI-D prisoner-of-war camp in the town. Nevertheless, local Poles managed to organize the underground resistance movement, which included secret Polish teaching, scout troops, a local branch of the Home Army, the Secret Military Organization and structures of the Polish Underground State. Independent underground Polish press was issued in the town.

The town was liberated by Soviet troops and local Poles in January 1945 and restored to Poland, although with a Soviet-installed communist regime, which then stayed in power until the Fall of Communism in the 1980s. Some members of the Polish resistance movement were persecuted by the communists after the war.

It was within Kalisz Voivodeship from 1975 to 1998.

== Economy ==
The dominant trade is in grain and seeds. The town hosts the headquarters of one of the largest Polish retail companies Dino Polska as well as the Polish branch of Mahle GmbH.

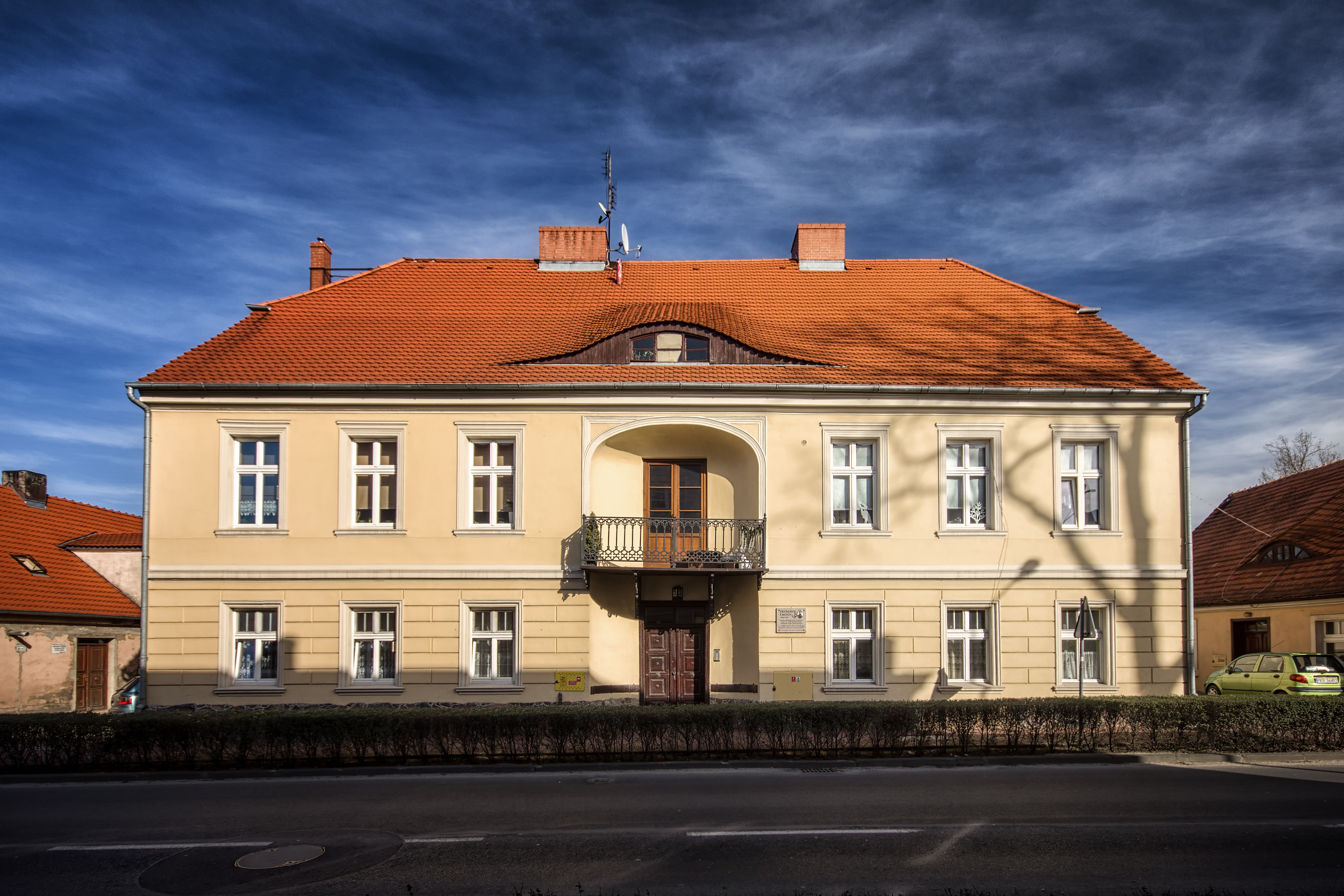
Place of stay of Fryderyk Chopin in 1829

== Demographics ==
Historical population

Year	Pop.	±%
1900	12,373	—
1910	13,064	+5.6%
1921	11,110	−15.0%
1931	12,969	+16.7%

Year	Pop.	±%
1939	14,135	+9.0%
1950	14,626	+3.5%
1960	18,505	+26.5%
2010	29,485	+59.3%

== Cuisine ==
The officially protected traditional food originating from Krotoszyn is wędzonka krotoszyńska, a type of Polish smoked pork meat (as designated by the Ministry of Agriculture and Rural Development of Poland). Local traditions of meat production date back hundreds of years, and the first butchers' guilds were established shortly after granting town rights in the early 15th century.

== Transport ==
Krotoszyn lies on a major road junction where national roads 36 and 15 intersect.

Krotoszyn is also major railway junction where the Polish Coal Trunk Line crosses the Leszno-Łódź railway line. Krotoszyn has its own railway station.

== Sports ==
The main sports club of the town is Astra Krotoszyn with football and volleyball sections.

== Notable people ==
- Paul Brodek (1884-1942), German politician
- Agnieszka Duczmal (born 1946), Polish conductor
- Martin A. Couney (1869–1950), American obstetrician
- Katarzyna Grochola (born 1957), Polish writer
- Georg Huth (1867–1906), German Orientalist
- Isidor Kalisch (1816–1886), reform rabbi
- Judah Aryeh ben Zvi Hirsch (fl. early 18th century), French Hebraist
- Theodor Kullak (1818–1882), German pianist and composer
- Marian Langiewicz (1827–1887), Polish military leader of the January Uprising
- Marcin Lijewski (born 1977), Polish handball player
- John Monasch (1865–1931), General Sir John Monash (change of name) was an innovative strategist in WWI
- Otto Roquette (1824–1896), German author
- Władysław Rybakowski (1885-1952), Polish social and political activist
- Maria Siemionow (born 1950), Polish scientist and microsurgeon
- Melitta von Stauffenberg (born Schiller) (1903–1945), German test pilot of WWII
- Louis Weissbein (1831-1913), architect, immigrated to the United States in 1854
- David Zvi Banet (1893–1973), Orientalist and Professor of Arabic Studies at the Hebrew University in Jerusalem
- Łukasz Kaczmarek (born 1994), Polish volleyball player

== International relations ==
=== Twin towns – Sister cities ===
Krotoszyn is twinned with:

- Bucak, Turkey
- Brummen, Netherlands
- Fontenay le Comte, France
- Dierdorf, Germany
- Maišiagala, Lithuania
- Fonyód, Hungary
- Okinoshima, Japan

== Gallery ==
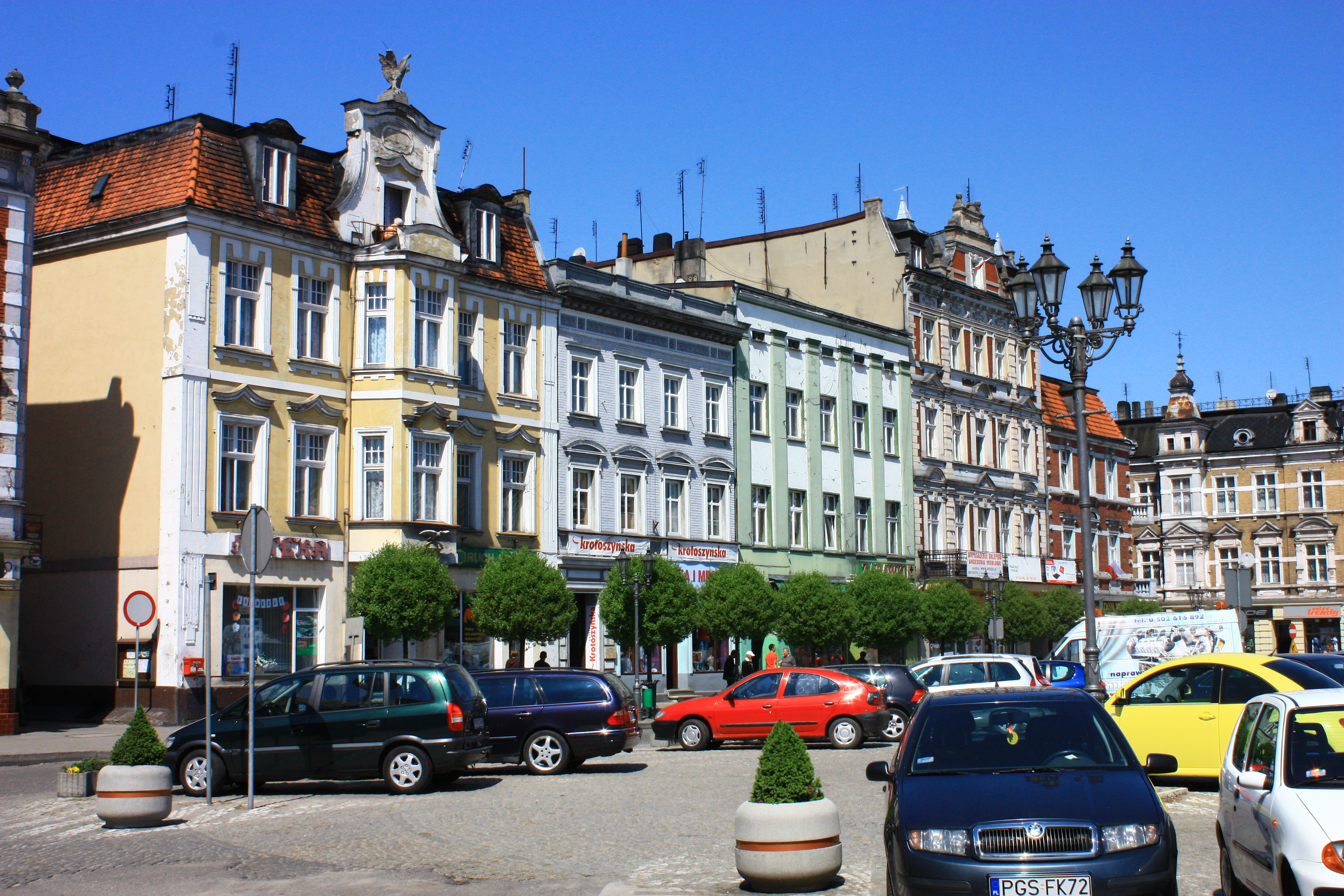
Historic townhouses at the Market Square

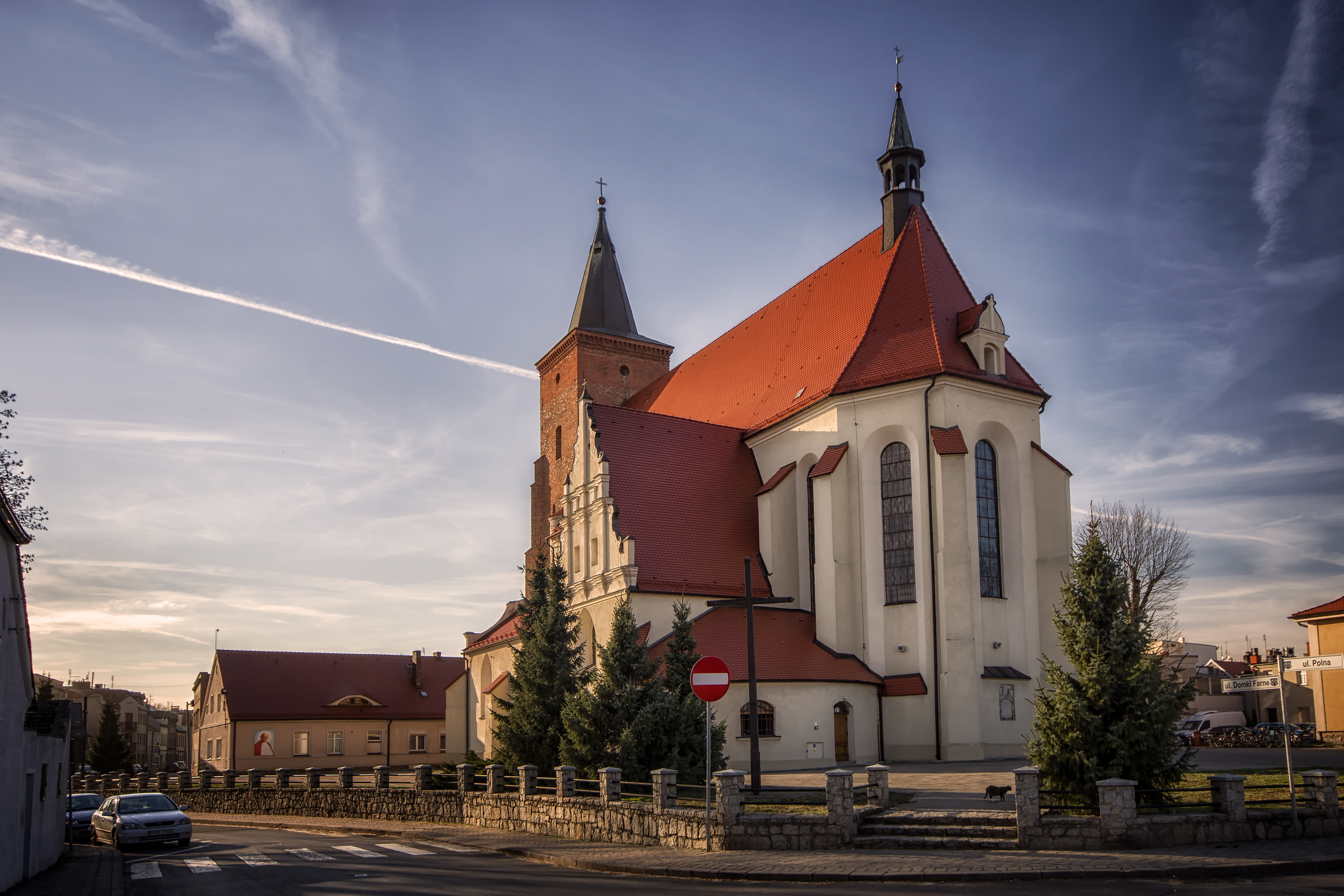
Gothic Saint John the Baptist church

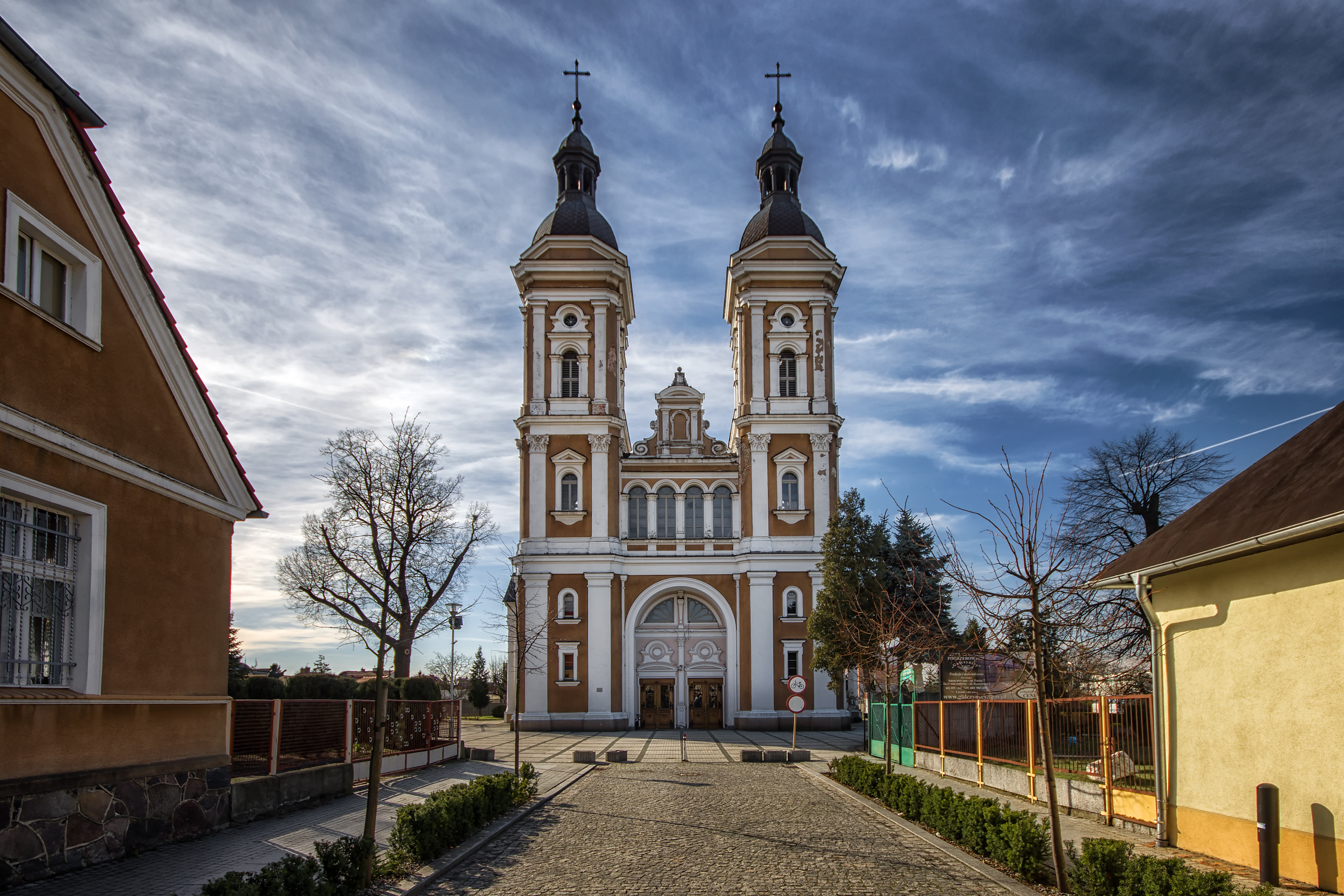
Saint Andrew Bobola church

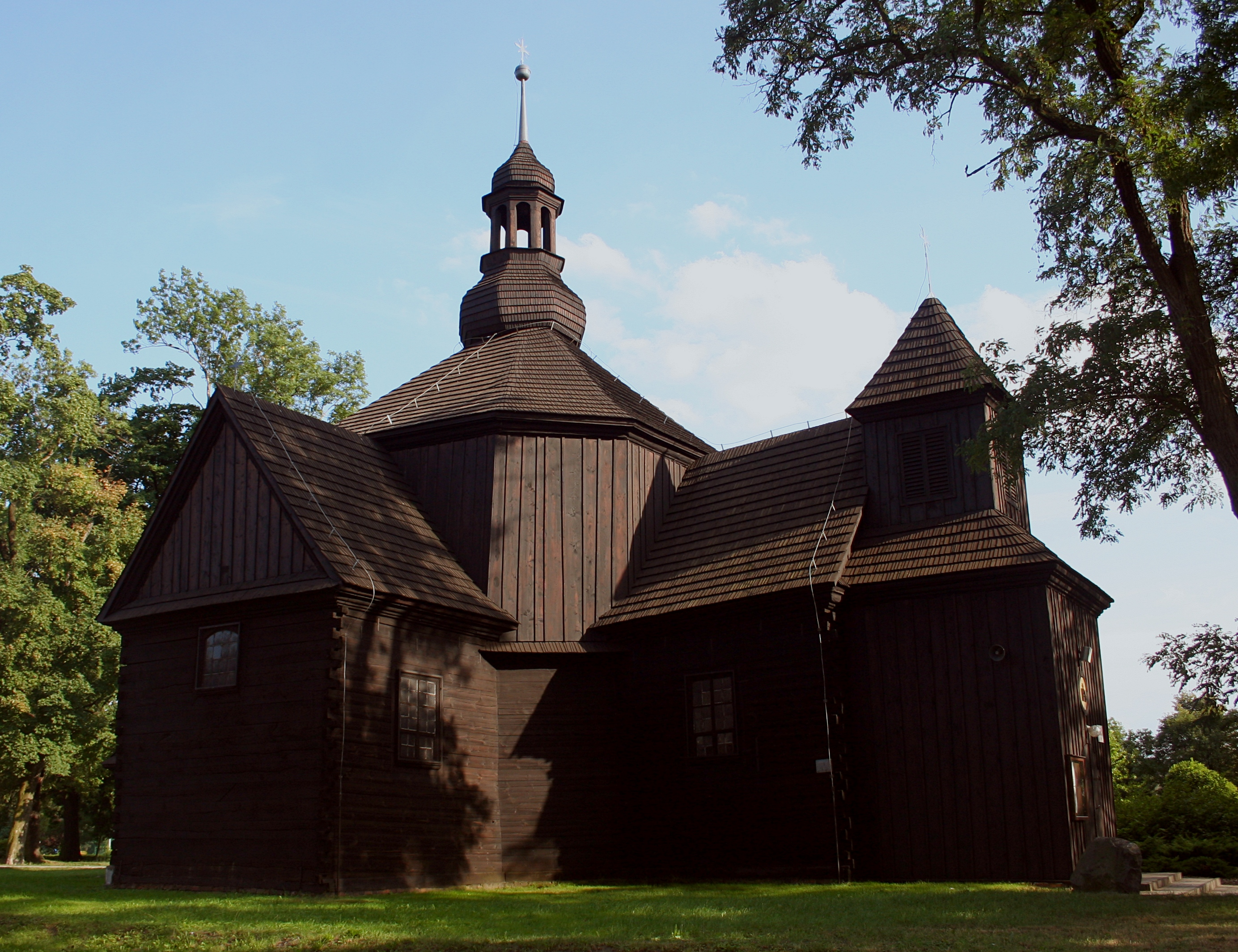
Preserved old wooden church of Saints Fabian, Roch and Sebastian

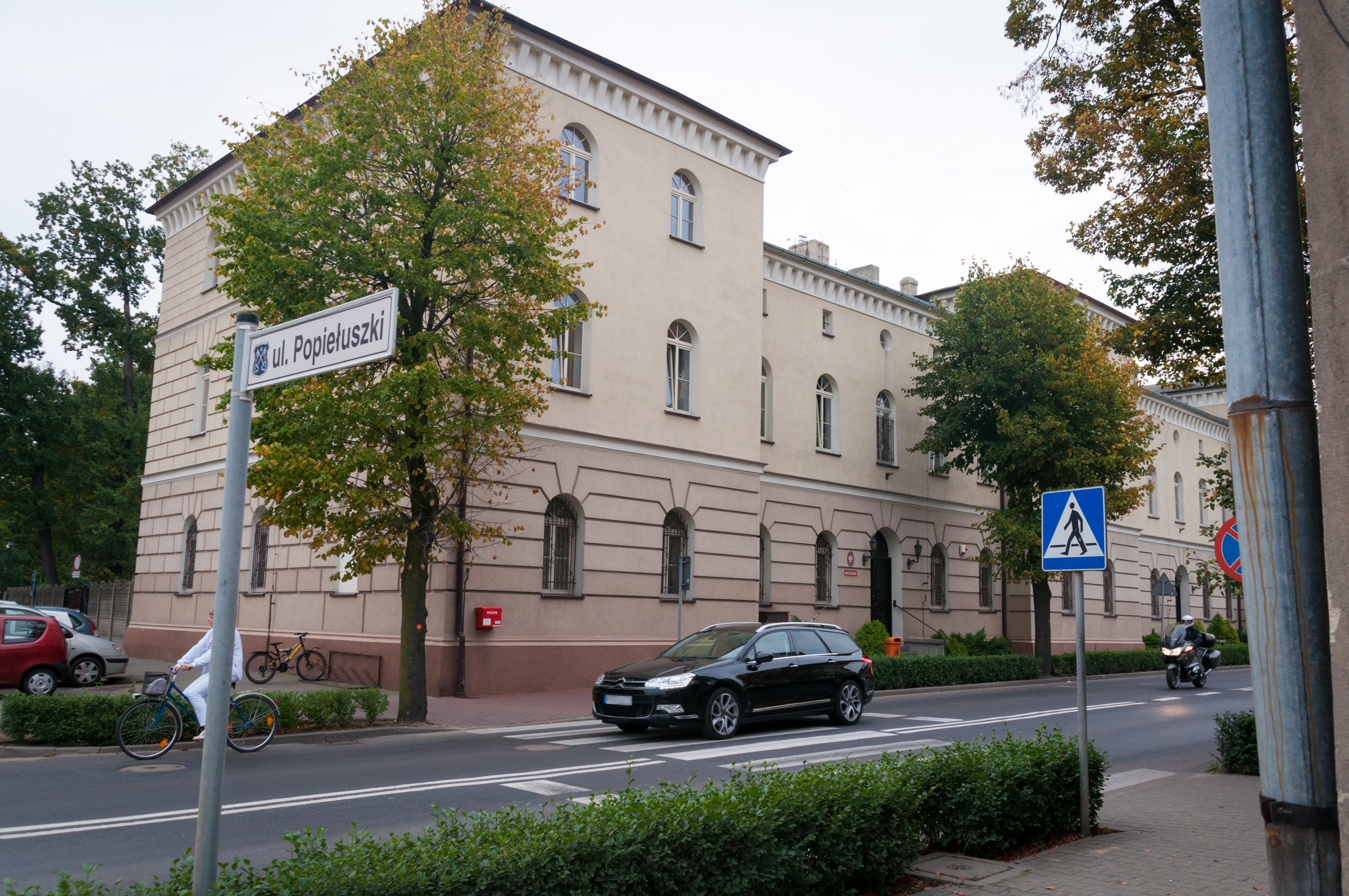
District court

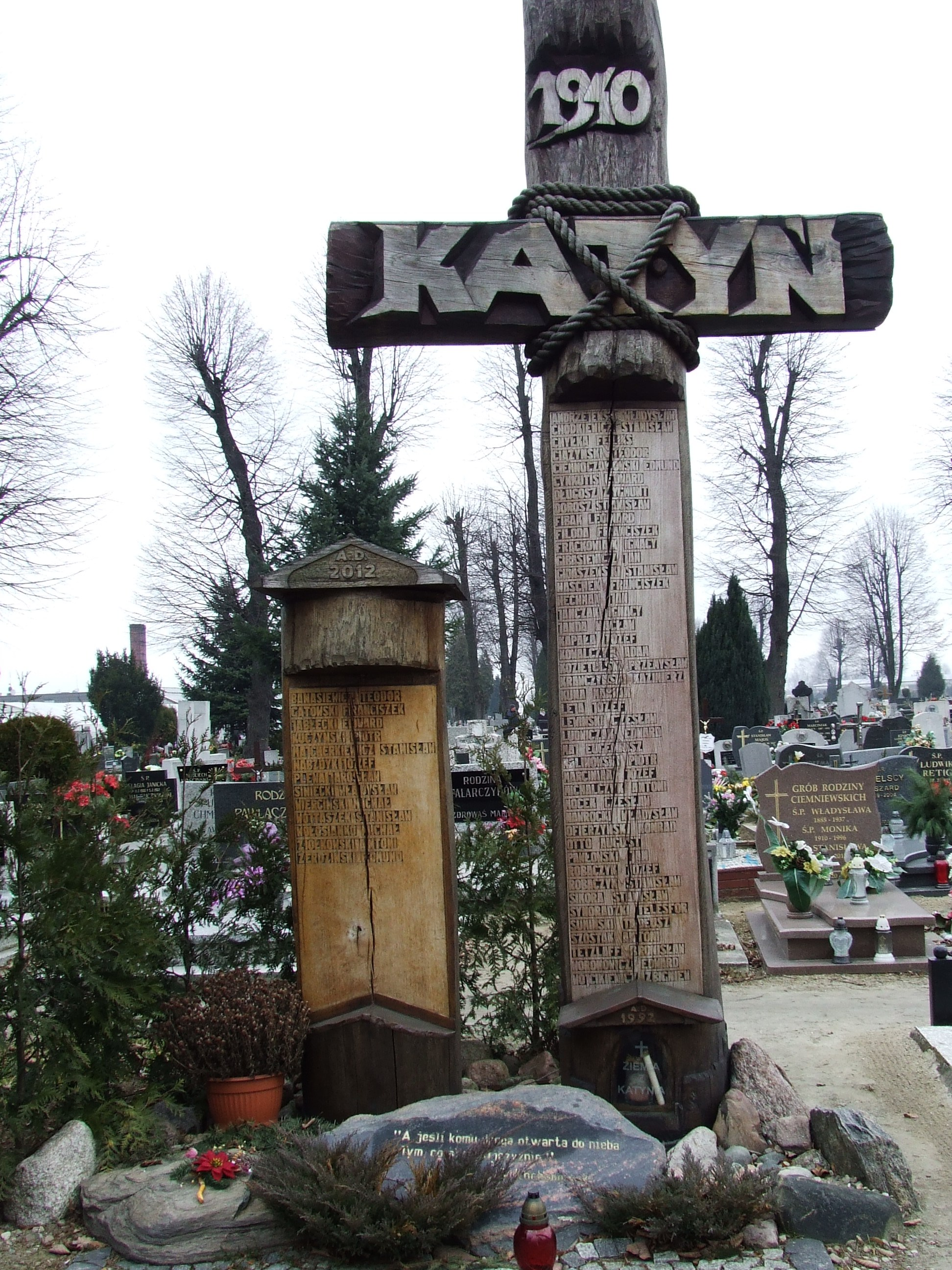
Katyn massacre memorial at the local cemetery
