= Leibovitz =

Leibovitz is a surname. Notable people with the surname include:

- Annie Leibovitz (born 1949), American portrait photographer
- Dan Leibovitz (born 1973), American basketball coach
- Liel Leibovitz (born 1976), Israeli journalist
- Lynn Leibovitz (born 1959), American judge
- Tahl Leibovitz (born 1975), American para table tennis player

== See also ==
- Leibovitz v. Paramount Pictures Corp., a 1998 US copyright fair use case
- Surnames from the name Leib
