= Liebowitz =

Liebowitz is a surname. It may refer to:

== People ==
- Jack Liebowitz (1900–2000), American accountant and publisher, co-owner of Detective Comics
- Michael Liebowitz, psychiatrist and researcher specializing in anxiety disorders
- Richard Liebowitz, copyright lawyer
- Ronald D. Liebowitz (born 1957), president of Middlebury College
- Shimen Liebowitz, American extortionist
- Sidney Liebowitz, better known as Steve Lawrence (born 1935), American singer
- Simon J. Liebowitz (1905–1998), New York politician and judge

== Fictional characters ==
- Fawn Liebowitz, a fictional character mentioned in the movie National Lampoon's Animal House

== See also ==
- Surnames from the name Leib
