= Leibovitch =

Leibovitch or Leybovitch is a Jewish surname. Notable people with the surname include:

- Ilan Leibovitch, an Israeli politician who served as a member of the Knesset
- Keren Leibovitch, an Israeli champion Paralympic swimmer
- Naum Leybovich Prokupets, a Moldovan-born Soviet sprint canoer
- Richard Leibovitch, a Canadian-American finance expert

== See also ==
- Surnames from the name Leib
