= Maya Leibovich =

Israeli rabbi

- 'מאיה ליבוביץ
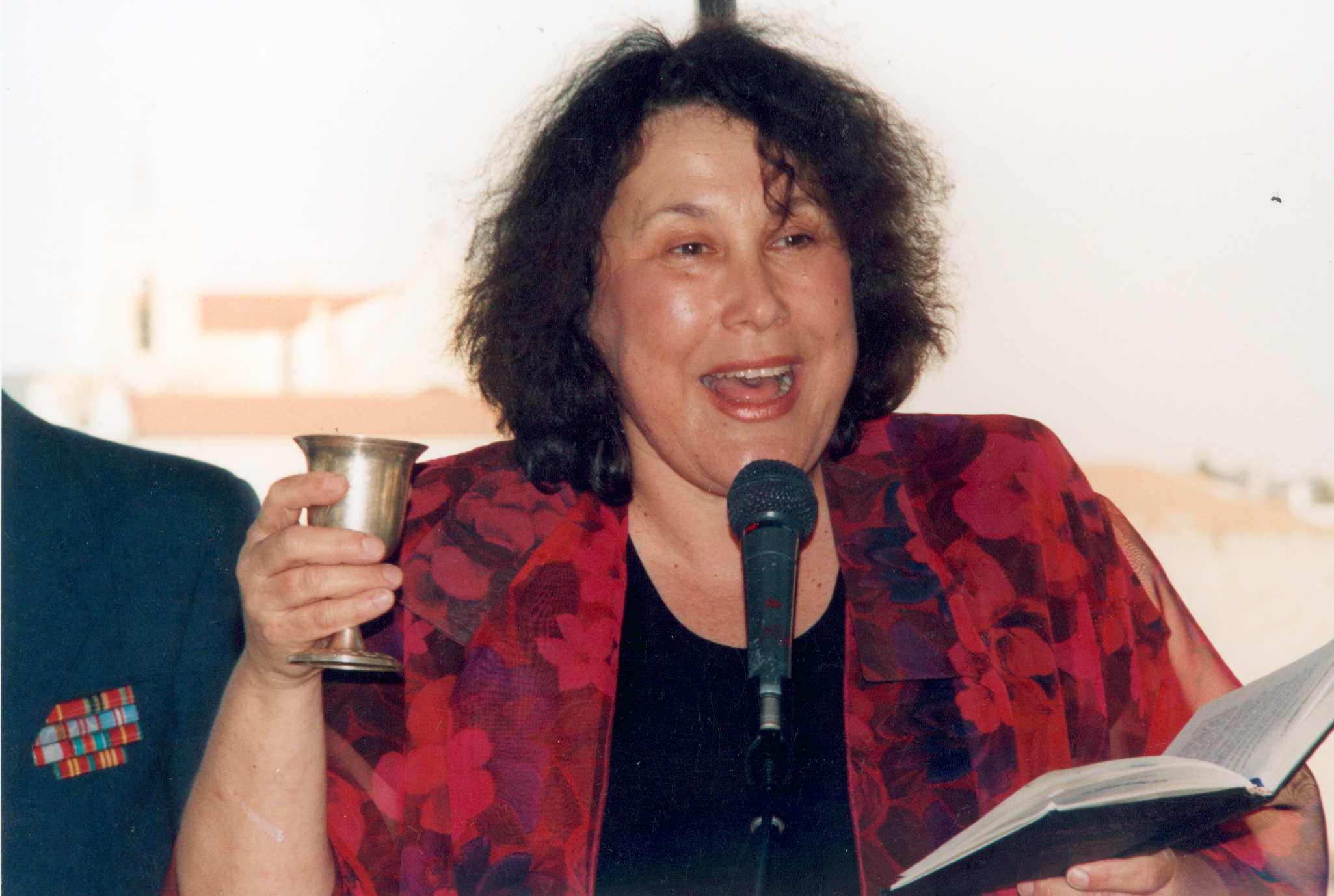
- Maya Leibovich

Personal life
- Born: Israel

Religious life
- Religion: Judaism
- Ordination: 1993

Maya Leibovich (Hebrew: 'מאיה ליבוביץ) is the first native-born female rabbi in Israel; she was ordained in 1993 at the Hebrew Union College-Jewish Institute of Religion in Jerusalem.

== Life ==
Her parents were Holocaust survivors.

She became the rabbi of Mevasseret Zion, and in 1996 applied for a lot to build a new synagogue in as her congregation was growing. The kindergarten that belonged to her community was burned down with a firebomb while the request was pending, but after Leibovich spoke with the mayor of Mevasseret and brought a delegation of Reform rabbis from the United States to back her at a council meeting, the council approved a plot of land for the synagogue, which was built.

Leibovich is also the editor of the Mahzor HaKavanah Sh’Balev, as well as the Siddur Ha’avodah Sh’Balev, which are the mahzor and siddur of the Reform Jewish movement in the former Soviet Union.

Rabbi Leibovich was the 2014 Summer guest rabbi at Temple B'nai Israel of Petoskey, Michigan.
