= Leyb ben Oyzer =

- Died: 1727

Leyb ben Oyzer or Yehuda Leib ben Ozer Rosencranz (Rosenkrantz), or Leib ben Rabbi Oizers (died 1727) was an 18th-century shamash ha-kehilla (beadle or sexton of the congregation), trustee, and secretary or notary, of the Jewish community in Amsterdam. He is the author of the Bashraybung fun Shabsai Tsvi, a Yiddish chronicle written in 1718 about the messianic Sabbateanism movement.

== Overview ==
Both an analysis of the failure of the movement and a cautionary tale, Oyzer's chronicle highlights the Ashkenazi role in the Sabbatean movement and the reaction of the Jewish community.

Oyzer says he interviewed the personal contemporaries of Shabbetai Zvi for research for his chronicle. Oyzer also compiled Ma'asim Nora'im (Horrible Acts), a manuscript which started with an abbreviated Toledot Yeshu, Gezeyros Yeshu, before going into the Sabbatean chronicle. The chronicle was published in excerpts by Jacob Emden in 1752 in his Torat ha-Qena'ot. The influence of Oyzer through Emden can be felt in Isaac Bashevis Singer's Satan in Goray. Oyzer wrote that the messianic enthusiasm in Europe stemmed from, according to him, "the Jews in this bitter exile, love to hear good tidings of comfort and salvation ... especially in Poland where evil and exile are exceedingly great, and every day brings new persecution and harassment." It is one of the few sources which consists of an overarching story tying together the movement of Sabbateanism. His chronicle is also the source for information about the early life of Shabbetai's wife Sarah Ashkenazi.

Oyzer was an important figure in his community and carried out a number of tasks for the elders of the congregation. Starting in 1708 he was entrusted with his role in the congregation. He started his work as a historian in 1711 after the Sabbatean prophecies of that year failed to materialize. He is also the author of a Hanukkah song called Ezkerah Rahamekha be-Shiruve-Simha.
