= Judah Aryeh ben Zvi Hirsch =

18th century French Hebraist

Judah Aryeh Loeb ben Zvi Hirsch of Carpentras (Hebrew: יהודה אריה לייב בן צבי הירש מקארפינטראץ, romanized: Yehuda Aryeh Leib ben Tsevi Hirsh mi-Karpintrats; fl. early 18th century) was a French Hebraist.

== Biography ==
Judah was born in Krotoschin, and lived at Avignon and Carpentras. He was the author of Ohole Yehudah, a Hebrew dictionary, in which special attention is paid to proper names and their etymology, and Geza' Yehudah, a short concordance. In his introduction to the former work he mentions two other works of his: Pene Aryeh and Ḥeleḳ Yehudah, both on the Pentateuch. The grammatical essay which preceded the Ḥeleḳ Yehudah was published with a German translation under the title Yesod leshon ha-ḳodesh. A Hebrew manuscript in the Bodleian Library contains a grammatical poem, beginning, and a commentary by Judah, to which are added the paradigms of the verbs, with a Hebrew-German translation, and some grammatical rules.

== Publications ==
- Ohole Yehudah (in Hebrew). Jessnitz: Yisrael Avraham. 1719.
- Geza' Yehudah (in Hebrew). Offenbach. 1732.
- Yesod leshon ha-ḳodesh (in Hebrew). Wilmersdorf: Hirsh ben Ḥayim mi-Fiyorda. 1724.
