= Aryeh Leib of Shpola =

Hasidic leader in Ukraine (1725–1811)

Aryeh Leib of Shpola or Yehuda Leib of Shpola (1725-1811) was a Hasidic Rebbe and was known as a popular miracle-worker and faith healer based in Shpola, Ukraine. He was also known as the Shpoler Zeide (Yiddish: "the Grandfather of Shpola"). He studied under the Baal Shem Tov and The Mezrticher Maagid. Yehuda Leib was associated with the third generation of Hasidism in the Ukraine; he is also known as Reb Leib Sara's, although some speculate about this. He was a fierce opponent of Nachman of Breslov, criticizing the new chassidish movement.

== His Birth ==
After his parents, Baruch and Rochel, hosted the Baal Shem Tov (before he was known), he revealed himself to them and blessed them with a child that would be righteous and told him to name him Yehuda Leib and said he would be by the bris of their son. Soon they gave birth to him. At the bris the parents didn't see him in the crowd so asked for all the guest to form a line and each person to give their own blessing to the child. After a while, they saw the Baal Shem Tov who put his hand on the baby's heart and blessed the child saying "I am an ignorant man, and I do not know how to say fancy blessings in Hebrew. But I remember how my father used to explain a verse in the Torah: 'And Abraham was old (zaken).' The Hebrew word for father is av, and the Hebrew word for grandfather is zaken. This verse tells us that Avraham was the grandfather of us all. I bless the child that he be a grandfather to the people of Israel, just like Avraham.” The crowd roared in good-natured laughter at the crude homily of the strange peasant, who so readily admitted his ignorance, but the parents took it with pride, knowing the Baal Shem Tov was a holy man. The nickname stuck and from then on, he was known as the Shpoler zeide, Shpole being the city he lived, and zeide being Yiddish for “grandfather.” The Shpoler Zeide once recounted about the day of his bris to his good friend Rabbi Shneur Zalman of Liadi, also known as the Alter Rebbe, saying "He (the Baal Shem Tov) placed his holy hand on my heart and ever since, I have felt warm."

== His Life ==
Reb Yehuda Leib grew up and ended up learning under the Mezrticher Maagid in the city of Mezritch. Not much is known about his time he spent there as a student of the Maggid. After the Maggid's passing, all of his approximately 120 students had a meeting in which they all were to different locations around Europe and the Eretz Yisrael to spread the relatively new teachings of Chassidus, in which Reb Yehuda Leib ended up living in Shpola. He had a very mysterious presence to him making not so much to be known about him, yet he was known for his love for every jew no matter what, like a grandfather (being another reason why he was called Zeide).

The Dancing Bear

The Shpoler Zeide is widely known for his great passion and enthusiasm ("chayus" in Hebrew) in all he did especially in his dancing, in which it was his custom that every Friday night. Once, one of his colleagues asked him how he learnt to dance as brilliantly as he does? He smiled and said the following story. In Russia there was a Jew who used to rent a tavern from a squire to make a living. One winter he had bad business, and was not able to pay the squire. The squire, being a wicked man, threw him in jail and said he will not release him until the debt is paid. That next week was the squire's birthday and he was thinking that he would get the Jew to dress up in a bearskin costume and compete with him in a dancing competition threatening death if he lost. At that time the Shpoler Zeide would wonder around from city to city and would try to inspire and help everyone he met in any way he could. He heard that in this specific town there was a Jew who owned a tavern and went to visit him. He went there and found out what happened to the Jew. He immediately went, got the guards drunk and switched places with the Jew. The day of the party came and the Shpoler Zeide in his bearskin was dancing with all his might against the squire. Eventually the Shpoler Zeide saw the squire was getting tired, so he tripped him and starting beating him. There were pleas to get him to stop, but he kept on going. He said he'll only stop if all the debt was waved and given ownership of the tavern. Fearing his life, the squire begrudgingly agreed and wrote right then and there that the tavern is now the Jew's. "Now you're probably wondering how I was able to outdance the squire who was Cossack a trained dancer." the Shpoler Zeide ended off, "when I was in jail Eliyahu Hanavi revealed himself to me in honor of the great Mitzvah I did by exchanging myself for the Jew and he taught me how to dance."

Chassidic Melodies-Nigunim

The Shpoler Zeide is known mostly for two Niggunim.

- Hupp Cossack - A niggun which starts a little slower but then speeds up later and ends off with saying the words "Hupp Cossack chitibitibum" over and over in a very joyous tune. It is officially the song played when he competed against the Cossack in the bearskin. It is often sung by festive events such as weddings and holidays.
- Kol Byaar - A much slower more serious Niggun speaking of a discussion between wayward children and his father in a mix of Hebrew, Yiddish, Russian, and Ukrainian. It starts with a wordless tune of sorrow and yearning and then speaks about how in the forest a voice can be heard of a father yearning and crying out for his children and then the wordless tune again. The second stanza speaks of the father asking for his children saying "My children, My children, where have you gone that you have forgotten Me?" and then the wordless tune again. The third stanza is saying ow the father is pleading with his children to return home saying "My children, my children, return to my home for I cannot dwell here alone." and again the wordless tune. The forth stanza is the children responding "Our father, our father, how can we return? For the guard is standing by the door." and again the wordless tune. (some then add a fifth stanza of the father answering not to worry either because you can defeat him, or about how Mashiach is almost here)

Shpoler Zeide's Se'udah

In 1793, the Shpoler Zeide was invited to be the Mohel or Sandek for a Bris on the other side of the Ros River in Boguslav. Traveling by sled, the Shpoler Zeide safely crossed the river, but on his return, the ice broke and the sled was in danger of sinking. The Shpoler Zeide saw a terrible decree against him in Heaven and offered a guarantee of a place in Gan Eden to whoever took his place. His Gabbai, Yollek (Yoel), bravely stepped forward and drowned, sacrificing his own life to save the Shpoler Zeide. On that evening, The Shpoler Zeide delayed Kabbolas Shabbos as he awaited Yollek's arrival in Gan Eden. After a long time, the elders informed him of the late hour, and he responded that Yollek was not yet in Gan Eden. However, after a brief moment, the Shpoler Zeide declared Yollek had arrived and signaled to begin davening. The following year, the Shpoler Zeide instructed his family and all his descendants to make an annual Seuda on the 19th of Shevat to thank the Almighty for the miracle and not to have waiters to personally involve everyone like it is by a family meal and invite poor people to the celebration (or to give money for the poor at the event) which is still practiced to this day.

== His Passing ==
The Shpoler Zeide's yahrzeit (date of passing) is 6 Tishrei. He was 87 years old. He is interred in Shpole.
