= Laura M. Labovich =

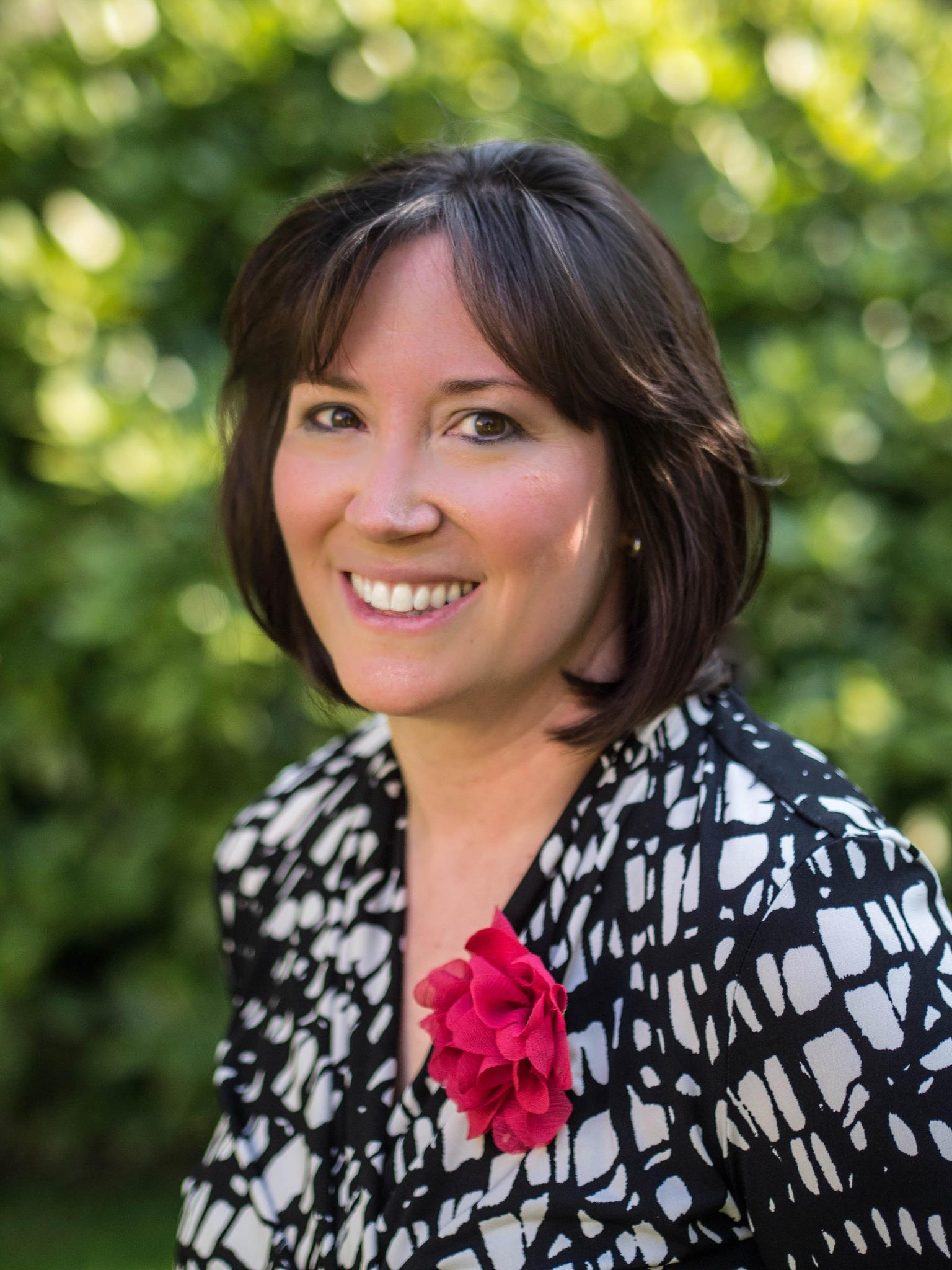
- Born: 1972 (age 53–54); Royal Oak, Michigan
- Education: Michigan State University
- Occupations: Author, Job Search Expert, Speaker
- Awards: CDI innovator Award (2012)

Laura M. Labovich (/ləˈboʊvɪtʃ/ lə-BOH-vitch; born 1972) is an author, national job search expert, speaker and chief executive officer of a boutique outplacement firm in Washington D.C. She is the co-author of 100 Conversations for Career Success(2012), and the author of the Pearson Workforce Education online course, the Ultimate job Search Course(2014).

== Early life ==
Labovich was born in Royal Oak, Michigan and raised in Farmington Hills, Michigan.

== Education ==
Labovich graduated from Michigan State University in 1994 with a Bachelor of Arts Degree in Employment Relations, with majors in Economics, Psychology and Sociology, and a Masters in Labor Relations and Human Resources from Michigan State University in 1999.

== Career ==
Labovich started her career as a receptionist at Walt Disney World in the Casting Department. Labovich was promoted to casting representative where she recruited nationwide for the highly competitive Walt Disney World College Program, led the recreation recruiting and staffing efforts for both Disney’s Typhoon Lagoon and Disney’s Blizzard Beach water parks, and staffed up Disney’s Animal Kingdom for its inaugural launch. Labovich went on to America Online, where she developed and launched AOL’s college internship program, hiring more than 100 MBA interns in its first year, and coached hundreds of employees from entry-level to executive on how to fit in, stand out, and move up in the company and in their careers.

In 2006, Labovich founded The Career Strategy Group, through which she offers career coaching, social media training and help with resumes.

== Selected publications ==
She co-authored 100 Conversations for Career Success. The book has been listed as top career book in 2013 in Forbes online.

== Awards and distinctions ==
Labovich was awarded CDI Innovator Award in 2012. She has also been featured in various television programs, industry trade journals, magazines, newspapers and radio programs.
