= Aryeh Leib ben Moses Zuenz =

Polish rabbi and scholar

Aryeh Leib ben Moses Zuenz (c. 1768–1833) was a rabbi and scholar of the 18th and 19th centuries who lived in Pińczów, and later in Plotzk commonly named "Maharal miTzintz". He died on the 3rd of Iyar.

== Works ==
He was the author of the following works:

- Ya'alat Chen (Zolkiev, 1802), sermons on different parashiyyot
- Get Mekushshar (Warsaw, 1812), compendium to that part of Maimonides' Yad which treats of divorce
- Magen ha-Elef, called also Shem Chadash (ib. 1817), on the regulations of the ritual codex referring to the Passover festival (to this work are appended notes on the Machatzit ha-Shekel of Samuel ha-Levi Kolin)
- She'elot u-Teshubot Gur Aryeh Yehudah (Zolkiev, 1827), compendium of the four ritual codices:
  - Chiddushim (Warsaw, 1830), treating of the shechitah and terefah
  - Simchat Yom-Tob (ib. 1841), complete commentary on the tractate Betzah
  - She'elot u-Teshubot Meshibat Nefesh (ib. 1849), responsa on the ritual codices
  - Chiddushim (ib. 1859), compendium of the ritual codex Yoreh De'ah
- Birkat ha-Shir (n. p., n. d.), a Passover Haggadah together with commentary
- Melo ha-'Omer, commentary on the Pentateuch and the Five Megillot
- Tib Chalitzah and Tib Kiddushin (n. p., n. d.), collections of responsa on the ceremony of chalitzah as observed in modern times, and on marriage contracts.

TheTzadik's call: before his death the Maharal of Tzintz promised to be an advocate to everyone who published his books. See also the words of the Gedolei Yisrael about the veracity and the validity of his certified promise.

== Jewish Encyclopedia bibliography ==
- Fürst, Bibl. Jud. s.v. "Zinz";
- Benjacob, Otzar ha-Sefarim, pp. 94, 96, 175, 208, 227, 296, 376, 591, 592, 594, 636.
