= Leib Sarah's =

Leib Sarah's (Aryeh Leib the son of Sarah) (1730–1791) was a Chassidic Rebbe and a disciple of the Baal Shem Tov. he (1730–1791) was held in high esteem by the Baal Shem Tov. One of the "hidden righteous," he spent his life wandering from place to place to raise money for the ransoming of imprisoned Jews. (It has been speculated that he is the same person as the Shpoler Zeide, however that is doubtful as their parents had different names.)

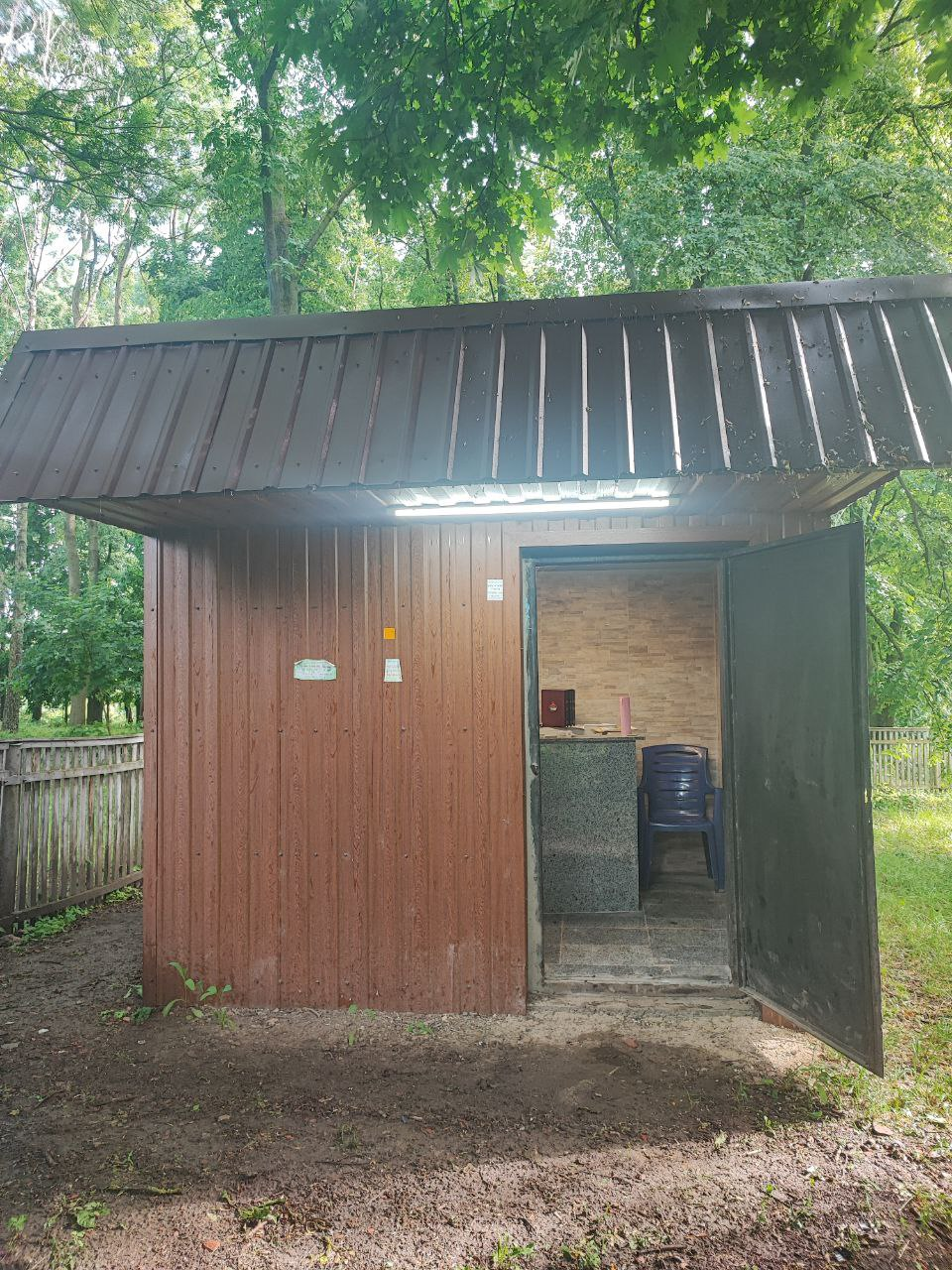
Rabbi Leib Sarah's Ohel in Yaltushkiv, Ukraine

Fortunate is one who dies with the name of God on his lips. He is a true tzadik

— Leib Sarah's
