= Gorka (disambiguation) =

Gorka is a given name and a surname.

Gorka may also refer to:

== Places ==
=== Poland ===
- Górka (disambiguation), a number of villages
- Gorka, a town in the county of Kreis Koschmin

=== Russia ===
- Gorka, Tver Oblast, a village
- Gorka, Vladimir Oblast, a rural locality
- Gorka, Gryazovetsky District, Vologda Oblast, a rural locality
- Gorka, Kichmengsko-Gorodetsky District, Vologda Oblast, a rural locality
- Gorka, Krasavinskoye Rural Settlement, Velikoustyugsky District, Vologda Oblast, a rural locality
- Gorka, Lipetskoye Rural Settlement, Verkhovazhsky District, Vologda Oblast, a rural locality
- Gorka, Mayskoye Rural Settlement, Vologodsky District, Vologda Oblast, a rural locality
- Gorka, Minkovskoye Rural Settlement, Babushkinsky District, Vologda Oblast, a rural locality
- Gorka, Mishutinskoye Rural Settlement, Vozhegodsky District, Vologda Oblast, a rural locality
- Gorka, Naumovsky Selsoviet, Verkhovazhsky District, Vologda Oblast, a rural locality
- Gorka, Roslyatinskoye Rural Settlement, Babushkinsky District, Vologda Oblast, a rural locality
- Gorka, Staroselskoye Rural Settlement, Vologodsky District, Vologda Oblast, a rural locality
- Gorka, Termengsky Selsoviet, Verkhovazhsky District, Vologda Oblast, a rural locality
- Gorka, Toropovskoye Rural Settlement, Babayevsky District, Vologda Oblast, a rural locality
- Gorka, Vepsskoye natsionalnoye Rural Settlement, Babayevsky District, Vologda Oblast, a rural locality
- Gorka, Yudinskoye Rural Settlement, Velikoustyugsky District, Vologda Oblast, a rural locality
