= Gorka =

Gorka is both a given name and a surname, the Basque form of the given name George. Notable people with the name include:

== Given name ==
- Gorka Aguinagalde (born 1966), Spanish actor
- Gorka Arrizabalaga (born 1977), Spanish cyclist
- Gorka Aulestia Txakartegi (born 1932), Basque literary historian
- Gorka Azkorra (born 1983), Spanish footballer
- Gorka Brit (born 1978), Spanish footballer
- Gorka Elustondo (born 1987), Spanish footballer
- Gorka Etxeberria (born 1972), Spanish football manager
- Gorka Fraile (born 1978), Spanish tennis player
- Gorka García (born 1975), Spanish footballer
- Gorka Gerrikagoitia (born 1973), Spanish cyclist
- Gorka González (born 1977), Spanish cyclist
- Gorka Gorosabel (born 2006), Spanish footballer
- Gorka Guruzeta (born 1996), Spanish footballer
- Gorka Iraizoz (born 1981), Spanish footballer
- Gorka Iturraspe (born 1994), Spanish footballer
- Gorka Izagirre (born 1987), Spanish cyclist
- Gorka Kijera (born 1986), Spanish footballer
- Gorka Laborda (born 1989), Spanish footballer and manager
- Gorka Landaburu (born 1951), Spanish journalist
- Gorka Larrea (born 1984), Spanish footballer
- Gorka Larrucea (born 1993), Spanish footballer
- Gorka Luariz (born 1992), Spanish footballer
- Gorka Maneiro (born 1975), Spanish politician
- Gorka Márquez (born 1990), Spanish dancer
- Gorka Otxoa (born 1979), Spanish actor and comedian
- Gorka Pérez (born 1995), Spanish footballer
- Gorka Pintado (born 1979), Spanish footballer
- Gorka Rivera (born 2004), Spanish footballer
- Gorka Santamaría (born 1995), Spanish footballer
- Gorka Sorarrain (born 1996), Spanish cyclist
- Gorka Unda (born 1987), Spanish footballer
- Gorka Urtaran (born 1973), Basque nationalist politician
- Gorka Verdugo (born 1978), Spanish cyclist

== Surname ==
- Gorka (surname)

== See also ==
- Górka (disambiguation), a number of villages in Poland
  - Gorka, a town in the county of Kreis Koschmin, Poland
- Gorkha Kingdom
- Gurkha
- Gorka (uniform), a Russian combat uniform
- FC Energiya-TEC-5 Druzhny, a Belarusian football club founded as FC Belarus Maryina Gorka
- Gorkamorka, a tabletop wargame
- USS Walter S. Gorka (APD-114), originally classified (DE-604), a United States Navy high-speed transport in commission from 1945 to 1947
- George (disambiguation)
- Gorakhpur division, Uttar Pradesh, India
  - Gorakhpur district, within Gorakhpur division
  - Gorakhpur, administrative headquarters of the division and district
