= Molokovo =

Molokovo (Russian: Молоково) is the name of several inhabited localities in Russia.

== Kostroma Oblast ==
As of 2010, one rural locality in Kostroma Oblast bears this name:

- Molokovo, Kostroma Oblast, a village in Prigorodnoye Settlement of Nerekhtsky District

== Moscow Oblast ==
As of 2010, two rural localities in Moscow Oblast bear this name:

- Molokovo, Leninsky District, Moscow Oblast, a selo in Molokovskoye Rural Settlement of Leninsky District
- Molokovo, Orekhovo-Zuyevsky District, Moscow Oblast, a village in Sobolevskoye Rural Settlement of Orekhovo-Zuyevsky District

== Perm Krai ==
As of 2010, one rural locality in Perm Krai bears this name:

- Molokovo, Perm Krai, a village in Permsky District

== Pskov Oblast ==
As of 2010, two rural localities in Pskov Oblast bear this name:

- Molokovo, Dedovichsky District, Pskov Oblast, a village in Dedovichsky District
- Molokovo, Opochetsky District, Pskov Oblast, a village in Opochetsky District

== Smolensk Oblast ==
As of 2010, one rural locality in Smolensk Oblast bears this name:

- Molokovo, Smolensk Oblast, a village in Barsukovskoye Rural Settlement of Monastyrshchinsky District

== Tver Oblast ==
As of 2010, three inhabited localities in Tver Oblast bear this name.

Urban localities

- Molokovo, Molokovsky District, Tver Oblast, an urban-type settlement in Molokovsky District

Rural localities

- Molokovo, Sandovsky District, Tver Oblast, a village in Sobolinskoye Rural Settlement of Sandovsky District
- Molokovo, Staritsky District, Tver Oblast, a village in Staritsa Rural Settlement of Staritsky District

== Vologda Oblast ==
As of 2010, three rural localities in Vologda Oblast bear this name:

- Molokovo, Cherepovetsky District, Vologda Oblast, a village in Musorsky Selsoviet of Cherepovetsky District
- Molokovo, Totemsky District, Vologda Oblast, a village in Pyatovsky Selsoviet of Totemsky District
- Molokovo, Vologodsky District, Vologda Oblast, a village in Veprevsky Selsoviet of Vologodsky District

== Yaroslavl Oblast ==
As of 2010, one rural locality in Yaroslavl Oblast bears this name:

- Molokovo, Yaroslavl Oblast, a village in Babayevsky Rural Okrug of Danilovsky District
