= Gorka Landaburu =

Spanish journalist

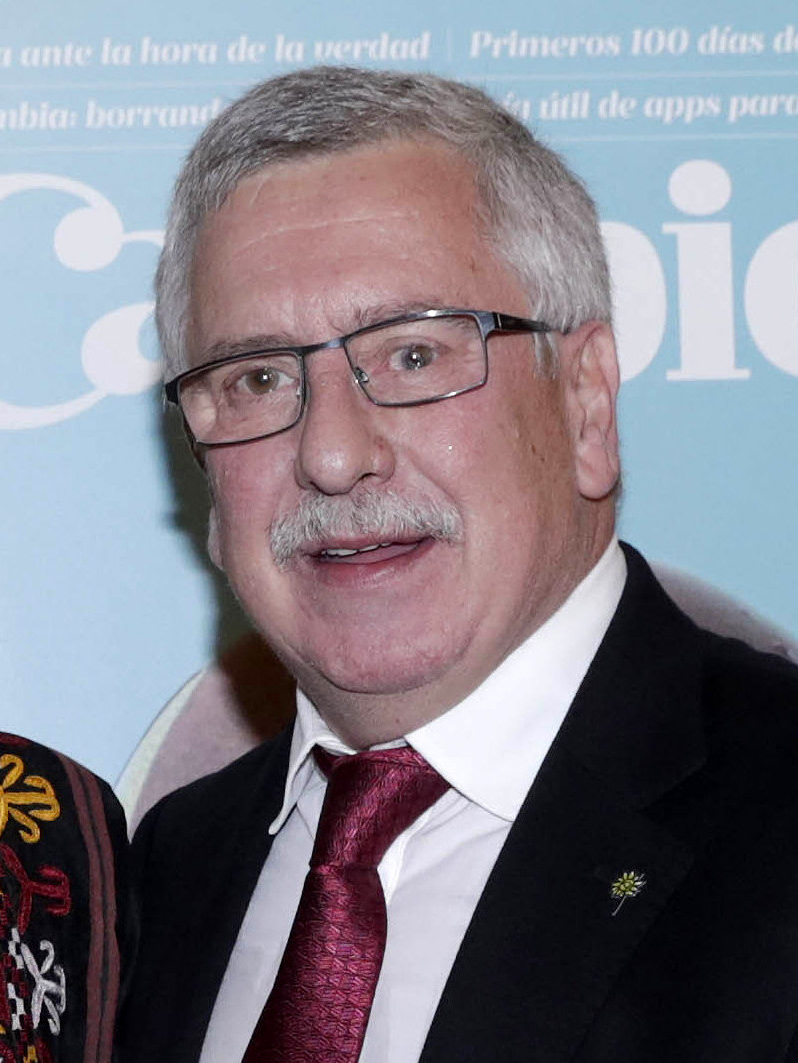
- Born: 11 October 1951 (age 75); Paris, France
- Occupation: Journalist
- Organization: Fundación Víctimas del Terrorismo
- Political party: PSOE
- Other political affiliations: Partido Socialista de Euskadi (PSE)
- Father: Francisco Javier de Landaburu

Gorka Landaburu (born in Paris on 11 October 1951) is a Spanish journalist. He has worked in various media and has been director and vice-president of the editorial board of the weekly Cambio 16 and the magazine Aldaketa Hamasei. He is the brother of the journalist Ander Landaburu, editor of the newspaper El País in the Basque Country. Throughout his career, he has distinguished himself for his opposition to all types of totalitarianism, both as an opponent of Franco's dictatorship and of ETA terrorism, which carried out an attack on him in 2001.

== Education ==
His father, Francisco Javier de Landaburu Fernández, was a PNV deputy during the Second Republic and vice-chairman of the Basque Government under Franco during his exile in Paris, where Gorka was born. It was also in Paris where he studied journalism. He returned to Spain in 1972 and worked as a French teacher in several schools.

== Professional career ==
He is a journalist with a career in the French media, such as Radio France, and in Spain, where he was correspondent for Canal Sur in the Basque Country and radio collaborator with Luis del Olmo in Las mañanas de Onda Cero. More recently, he has been director of the weekly Cambio 16 and Aldaketa Hamasei (Cambio 16 in Basque). He is also vice-president of the editorial board of Cambio 16, following the incorporation of Jorge Neri as president, and director of the Espacio de Información General news agency. He also participates as a commentator in television programmes such as 59 segundos on RTVE (Spanish National Television).

== Political commitment ==
A member of the PSOE since 1993, his opposition to violent nationalism and terrorism in the Basque Country has marked his career and been the focus of much of his work.

In 2005, Landaburu opposed the court-ordered closure of the newspaper Egunkaria, accused of collaborating with ETA. He has worked with the coordinator of Gesto por la Paz and is president of the Basque Group of Victims of Terrorism. In February 2006 he signed the manifesto "Sí en nuestro nombre, sí a que se busque la paz" ("Yes in our name, yes to the search for peace"), which defended dialogue between the Spanish government and the terrorist group.

== Terrorist attack ==
Gorka Landaburu received a parcel from a magazine he subscribed to at his home in Zarauz (Guipúzcoa) on 15 May 2001. The parcel bomb, sent by the terrorist group ETA, contained 150 grams of Titadyne dynamite, which exploded when he opened it, causing serious injuries to his face and abdomen and the amputation of a phalanx of the index finger of his right hand and a phalanx of all the fingers (except the thumb) of his left hand. His home has also been the target of attacks by violent groups on several occasions, and he has been forced to have bodyguards for several years. He is a member of the Victims of Terrorism Foundation.
