= Cambio16 =

Spanish current affairs magazine

- Categories: News magazine
- Frequency: Monthly
- First issue: 1 September 1971; 54 years ago
- Company: Grupo 16
- Country: Spain
- Based in: Madrid
- Language: Spanish
- Website: www.cambio16.com

Cambio 16 is a Spanish language monthly current affairs magazine published in Madrid, Spain, by "Group 16".

== History and profile ==
Cambio 16 was first published as a weekly in September 1971, and founded by the Spanish journalist Juan Tomás de Salas, and played an important media role during the Spanish political transition from the Francoist State to democracy. The editors originally wanted to name it Cambio, but the government insisted on a longer title before allowing it to be registered, so it was changed to Cambio 16 in honor of the magazine's sixteen founders. The founders were those who focused on change in Spain. Grupo 16, the owner of the weekly, also launched Diario 16, Motor 16 as well as the station Radio 16.

The headquarters of Cambio 16 is in Madrid. The magazine is similar to Time and Newsweek in terms of its content. It also publishes issues in Catalonia under the name Canvi Setze and in the Basque Country as Aldaketa Hamasei.

The first director of Cambio 16 was Juan Tomás de Salas from 1972 until 1976 when he was replaced by José Oneto who ran the magazine until 1986. Then Ricardo Utrilla took over in 1986, Enrique Badía in 1988, Luis Díaz Güell in 1989 and de Salas once again in 1991 until 1994, followed by Román Orozco from 1994 until 1996. Gorka Landáburu took over in 2003 until present.

Cambio 16 has a center-progressive and mainstream political stance. The US Department of State described the magazine as a centrist publication in 2000.

Cambio 16 was suspended several times in the Francoist State until the approval of the new Spanish Constitution in 1978. It is a pioneer publication in investigative journalism in Spain together with now defunct newspaper Diario 16.

The early 1980s marked the first crisis for the medium, as the advent of democracy reduced readers' interest in political coverage and increased competition as newspapers and radio stations were free to provide political information.

In April 1989 the French publishing house Hersant (publisher of Le Figaro) bought 31% of Group 16. In October 1993, Jesús de Ramón Laca became the new majority shareholder of Grupo 16, replacing Juan Tomas de Salas as chairman, who, faced with debts estimated at 2,000 million pesetas and political pressure, was forced to sell his shares for zero pesetas in July 1994. The 1993 circulation of Cambio 16 was about 90,000 copies.

The company's economic crisis worsened and in September 1995 Laca reached a compromise with the businessman José Luis Domínguez to sell him the majority of the shares in the group, which until then controlled three publications: Cambio 16, Diario 16 and Motor 16.In August 1996, Dominguez was forced to continue firing.

In 1997, in the midst of an acute economic crisis, the magazine celebrated its 25th anniversary.15 The managers of Grupo 16 attempted to separate the financial problems of Diario 16 and the weekly Cambio 16, both of which had suspended payments since the end of 1995, in order to save the magazine.

In 1998, the Andalusian group ESA-EBC Editorial (now EIG Multimedia S.R.L.) became the new owner of Cambio16 with Manuel Domínguez Moreno as Chairman of the Editorial Board. After Juan Tomas de Salas died of cancer on 22 August 2000, aged 62, the magazine was re-launched after going bankrupt.

It was in the midst of this readjustment, in 2001, that Cambio 16's Basque delegate, Gorka Landaburu, was injured in an attack by the terrorist organisation ETA when he opened a parcel bomb, suffering serious injuries all over his body, losing part of his hands and the sight in his left eye. Despite this, Landaburu took over as director of the weekly in 2003.

In 2014, Francisco Neri and Jorge Neri joined the editorial board of EIG Multimedia, and in 2016 Landaburu was appointed as the new president of the EIG group and director of the weekly. To combat the decline of newspapers threatened by the arrival of digital media, a new editorial and business model is proposed: The content has been revamped. It now focuses on in-depth topics that encourage leisure reading. The design of the print and digital versions has also been revamped.

In September 2023, the Trademark Court of the European Union ruled that the trademark Diario16, which was being used by the company Multimedia Ediciones Globales, S.L., belongs to Grupo EIG Multimedia, the publisher of Cambio16. As a result, the company has been ordered to cease use, to cancel a number of domains, and to pay a fine.

== See also ==
- List of magazines in Spain
