= Gorka (surname) =

Gorka or Górka is a surname and may refer to:

- Benjamin Gorka (born 1984), German footballer
- John Gorka (born 1958), American folk musician
- Katharine Gorka, American national security analyst
- Magdalena Górka (born 1977), Polish cinematographer
- Mickey Gorka (born 1972), Israeli basketball player and coach
- Sebastian Gorka (born 1970), British-American national security advisor
- Walter H. Gorka (1922–1942), United States Navy sailor and Air Medal recipient, namesake of USS Walter S. Gorka

== See also ==
- Gorki
- Gorky
