= Gorka (uniform) =

Uniform of the Soviet and Russian Army

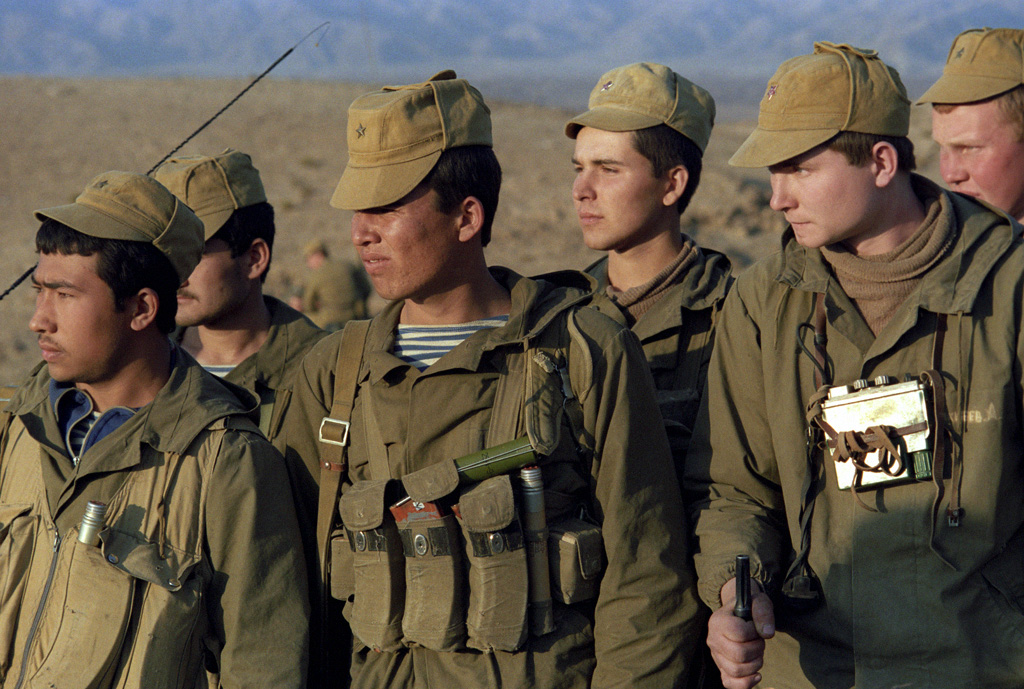
- Soviet special forces wearing the Gorka during the Soviet-Afghan War in 1988
- Type: Military uniform
- Place of origin: Soviet Union

Service history
- In service: 1980s–present
- Used by: See Users
- Wars: Soviet–Afghan War; First Chechen War; Second Chechen War; 1999 war in Dagestan; Insurgency in Ingushetia; Russo-Georgian War; Donbass War; Russo-Ukrainian War

Production history
- Variants: See Variants

The Gorka (Russian: горка, romanized: Gorka) is a Soviet and Russian military uniform originally designed for use in mountain warfare during the latter phases of the Soviet–Afghan War and saw continued use during many of the post-Soviet conflicts. The uniform is still actively used by the Russian Armed Forces, several countries of the Collective Security Treaty Organization, the Armed Forces of Ukraine, and Russian separatist forces in Ukraine, among others. The uniform is also used on the civilian market for hunting, mountain climbing, and outdoor recreation.

== Etymology ==
According to the Oxford Russian Dictionary, the word Gorka (горка) can be roughly translated as hill or hillock, it can also refer to a mountain. This is because the suit was originally designed to be worn in the mountains and other regions with inclement weather.

== History and design ==
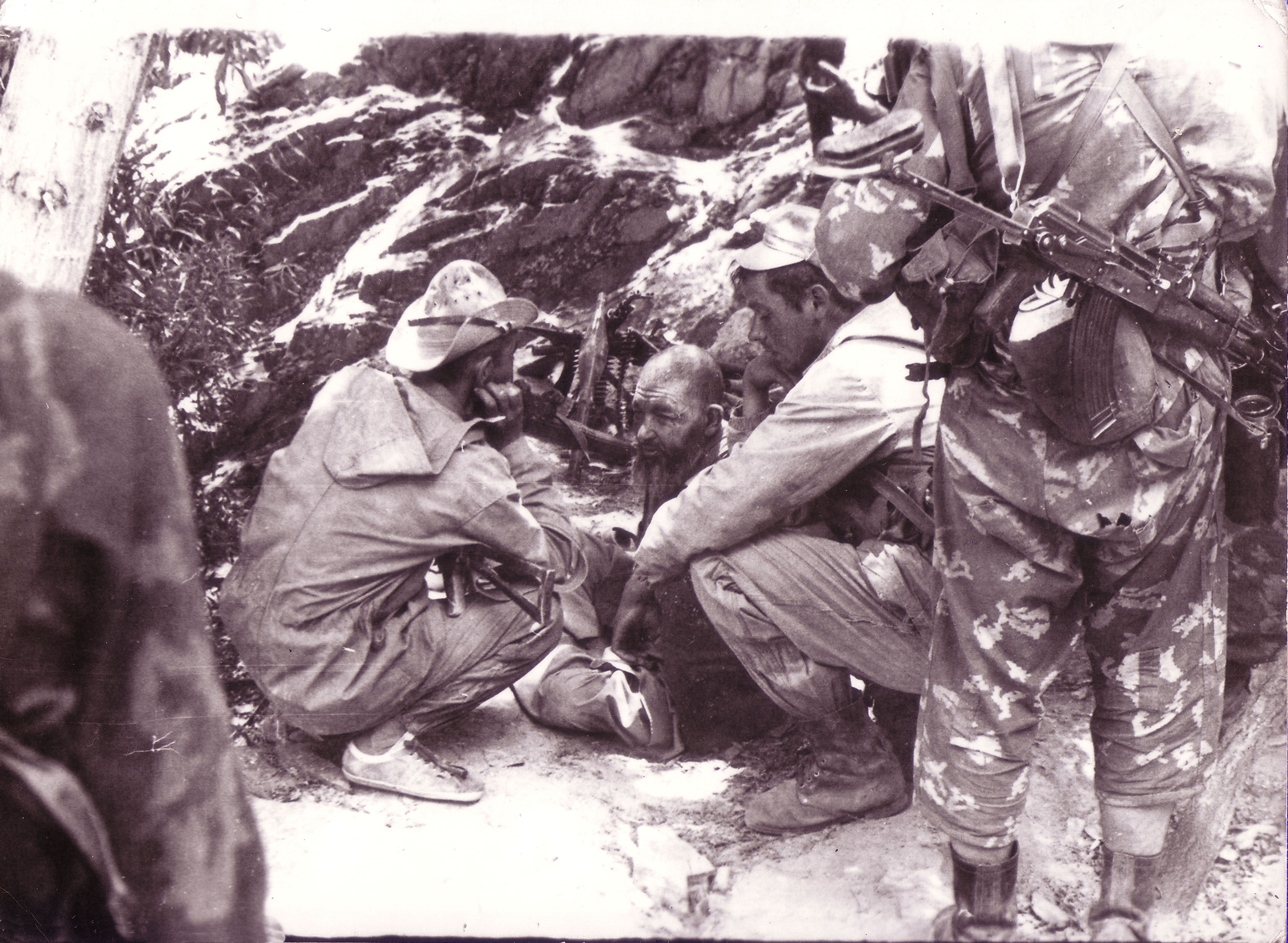
Spetsnaz troops interrogate a captured Mujahideen insurgent in 1986. The two soldiers in the middle are wearing second pattern Gorka suits

The Gorka has its origins in the Soviet–Afghan War where it was developed from civilian windproof smocks and mountaineering suits which provided the wearer protection from the elements, particularly against wind chill and light rain. The Gorka's robust tarpaulin fabric made the suit ideal for mountain warfare and early variants were utilized by specialist Soviet troops. According to Vlad Besedovskyy of Safar Publishing, the first two patterns of the Gorka were originally produced from 1981 to 1991 and came in two major variants, the First Pattern (early version) which was produced from 1981 to 1987 and the Second Pattern (later version) which was produced from 1987 to 1991.

The first pattern Gorka was constructed of water-repellent fabric and consisted of a button up hooded jacket with double breast pockets, side pockets, and a waistband cord. The trousers of the first pattern had two thigh pockets with suspenders similar to overalls and a reinforced crotch. Meanwhile, the second pattern Gorka jacket was simplified and consisted of a hood, inner clasp buttons, cut-in side pockets, and a hidden breast pocket on the interior of the jacket. The trousers of the second pattern featured outer thigh pockets, a reinforced crotch, and suspenders with elastic bands around the calf. Gorkas are commonly made out of tent fabric materials similar to ripstop with reinforcements. The most common modern-day variant of the Gorka is the Gorka 3 which is widely used by the Russian Armed Forces.

== Variants ==
The first two models of the Gorka uniform came in one color, khaki, as it was originally designed for the arid and desert regions of Afghanistan, however, many modern after-market versions of the Gorka come in a variety of camouflage patterns.

== Users ==
- Abkhazia - used by the Pyatnashka Brigade
- Belarus - used by the Armed Forces of Belarus
- Chechnya - used by Kadyrovites and the Special Battalions Vostok and Zapad
- Donetsk People's Republic - used by Donetsk separatists
- Kazakhstan - used by the Armed Forces of the Republic of Kazakhstan
- Luhansk People's Republic - used by Luhansk separatists
- Russia - used by the Russian Armed Forces
- Soviet Union
- Transnistria - used by the Armed Forces of Transnistria
- Ukraine - used by the Armed Forces of Ukraine

== Gallery ==
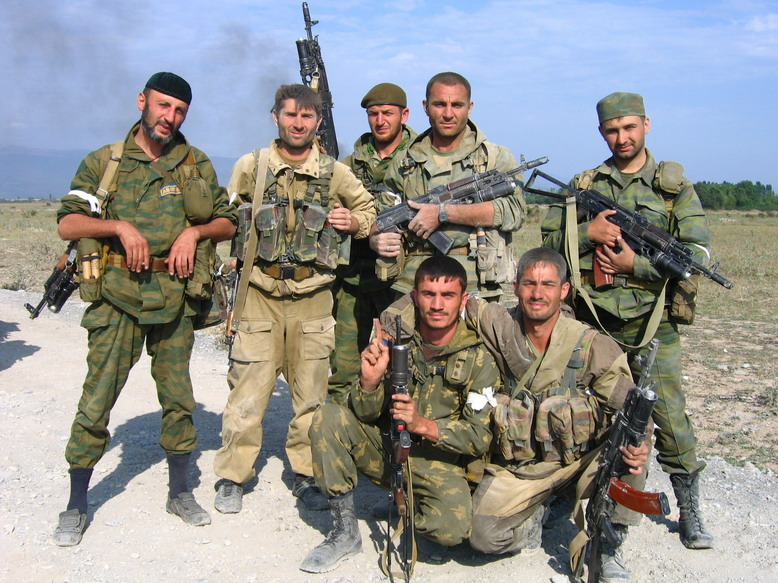
Chechen soldiers of the Special Battalions Vostok and Zapad during the Russo-Georgian War, several of which are wearing Flora camouflage Gorkas

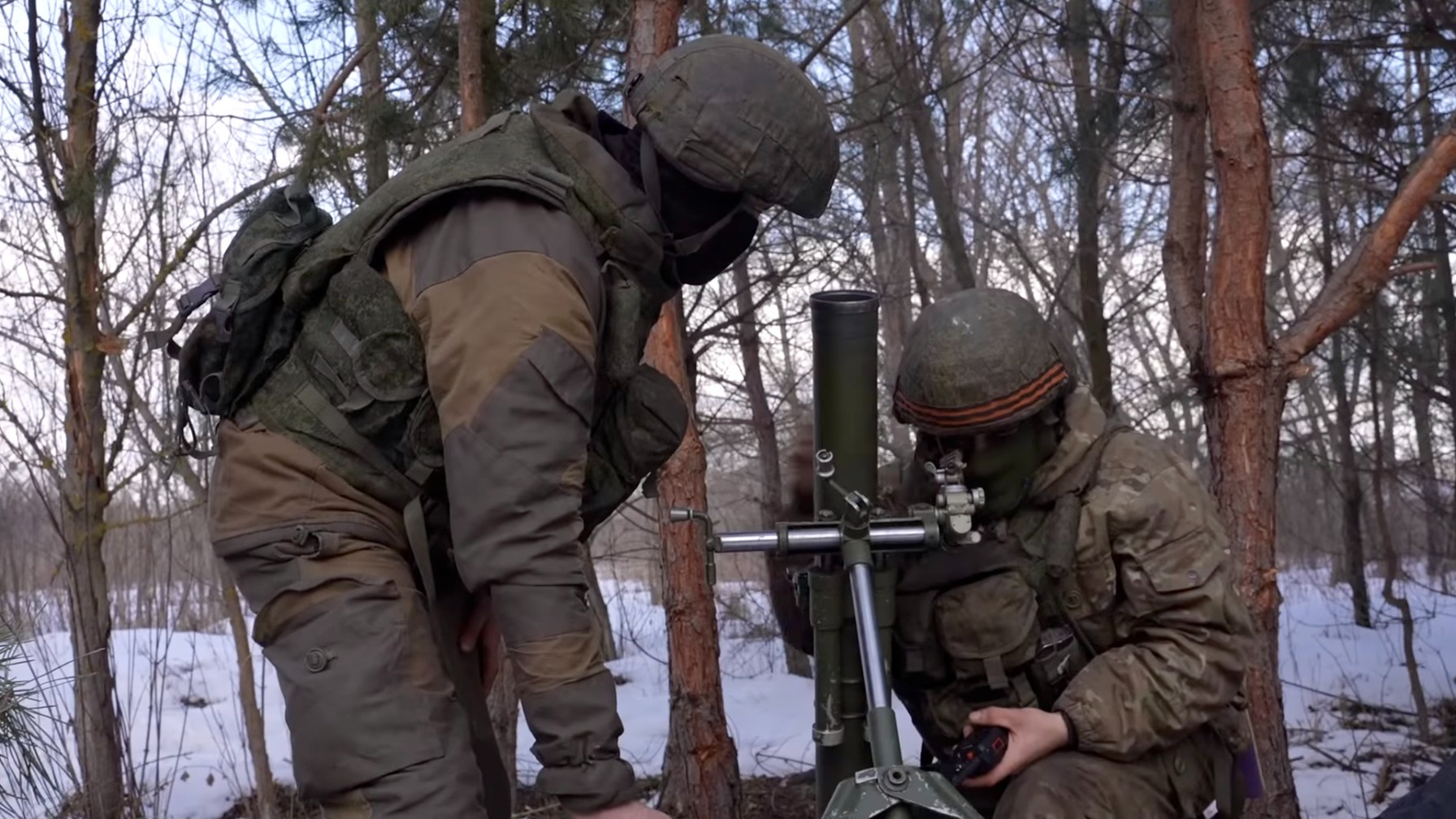
Russian troops in northeastern Ukraine in 2023, the soldier on the left is wearing a common Gorka 3 suit

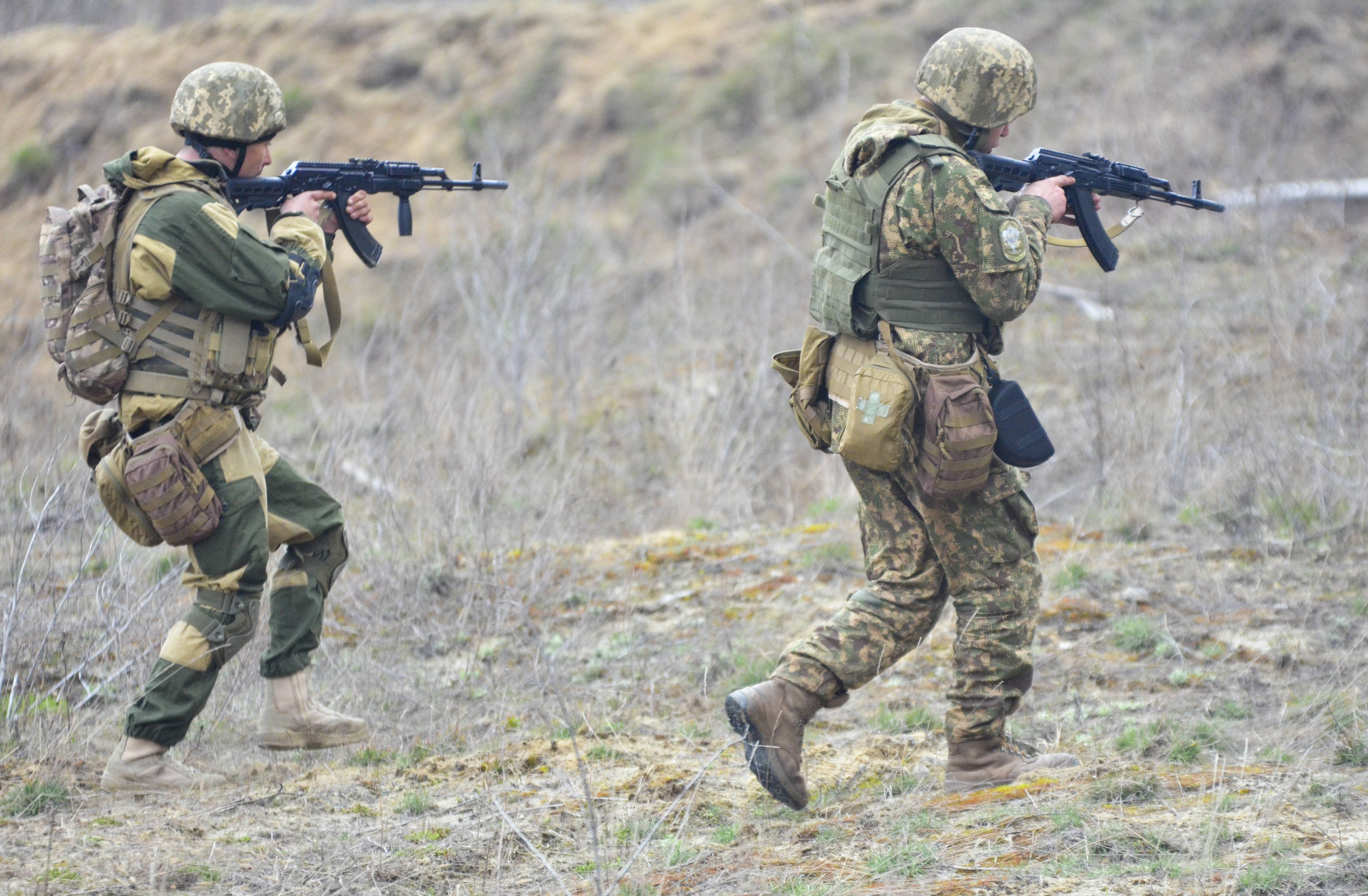
A soldier of the Armed Forces of Ukraine (left) wearing a Gorka during training

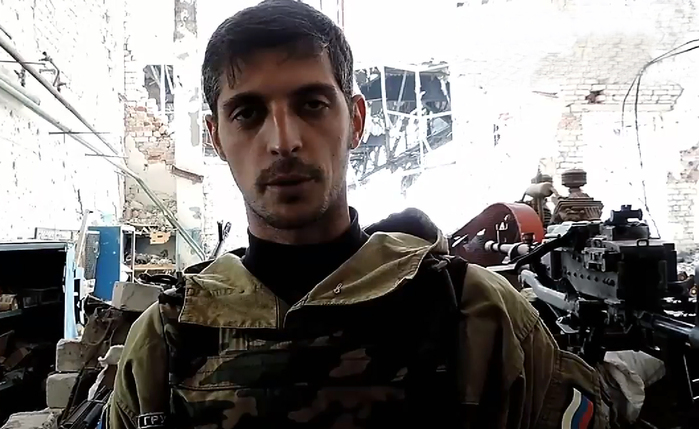
Mikhail Tolstykh aka "Givi" of the Somalia Battalion wearing a Gorka 3

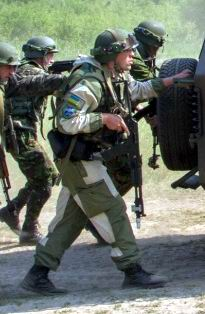
A soldier of the National Guard of Ukraine wearing a Gorka 3 suit

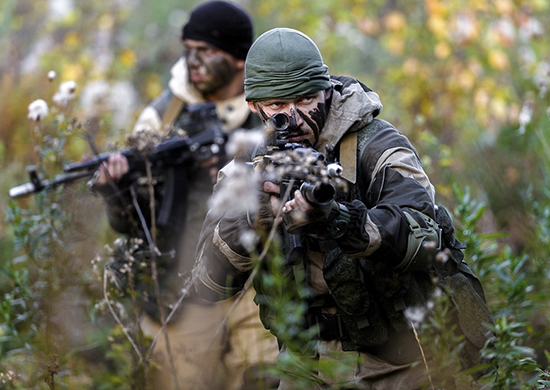
Russian special forces wearing Gorka 3 suits

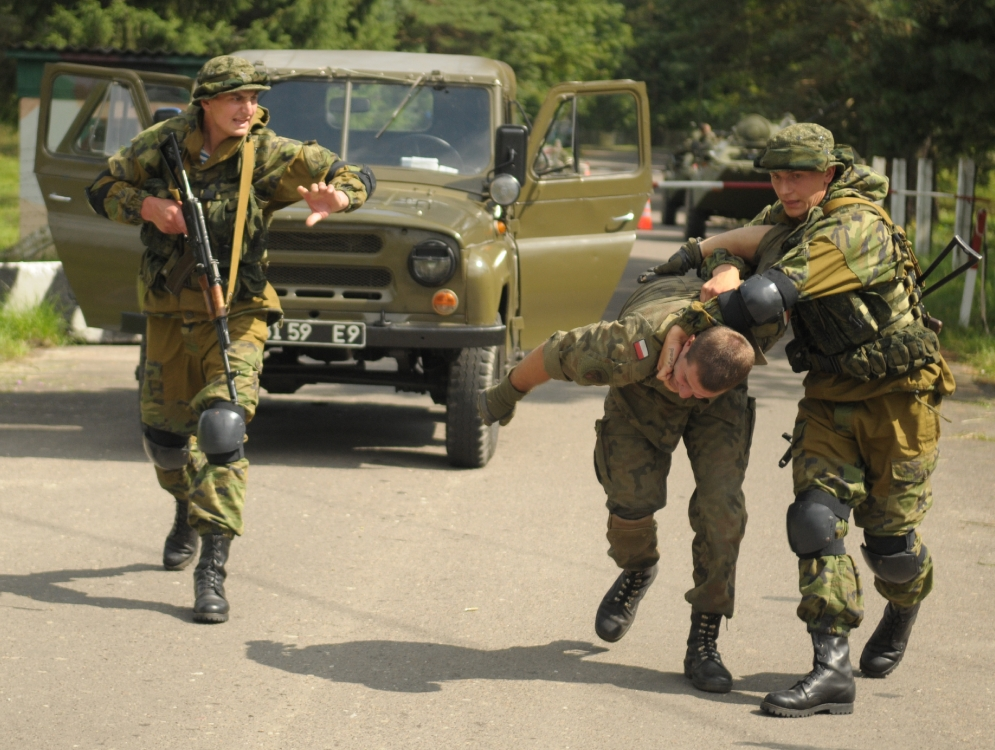
Spetsnaz GRU soldiers during training wearing U.S. Woodland camouflage Gorkas

A soldier of the Armed Forces of Belarus (right) wearing a U.S. Woodland Gorka

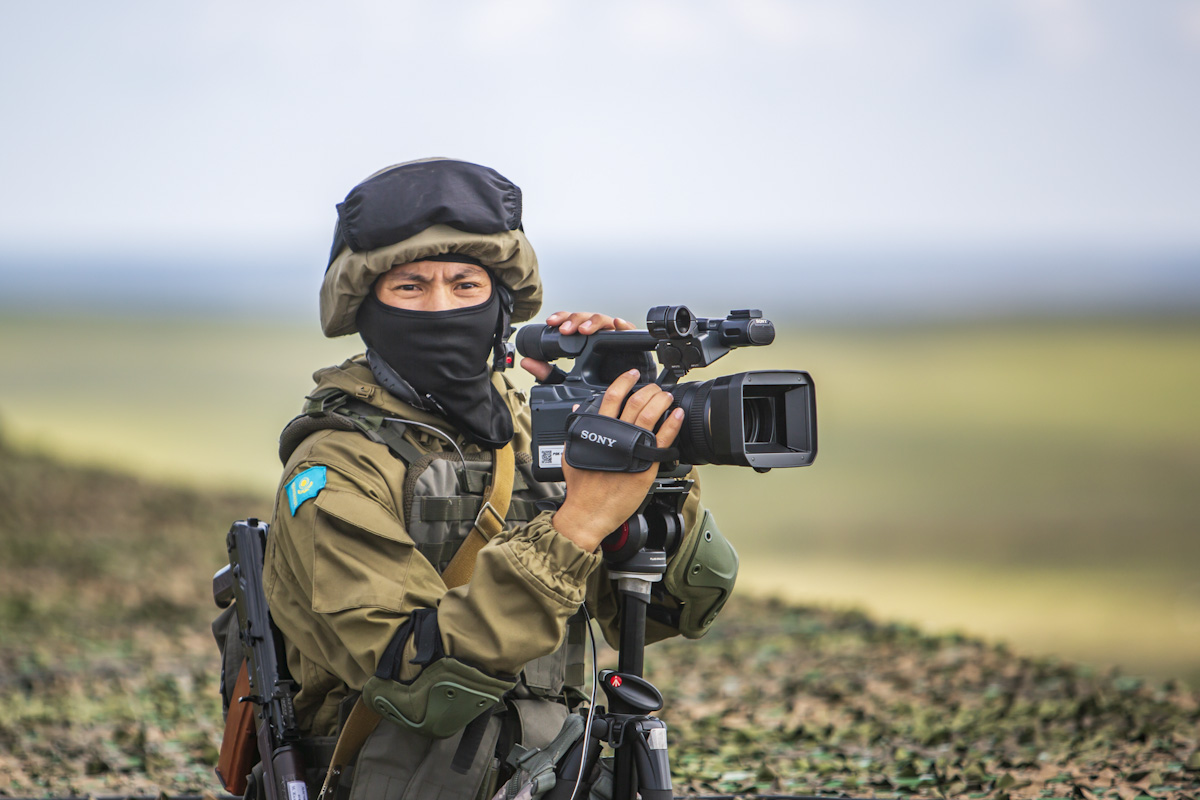
A Kazak soldier of the Armed Forces of the Republic of Kazakhstan during Peaceful Mission 2018

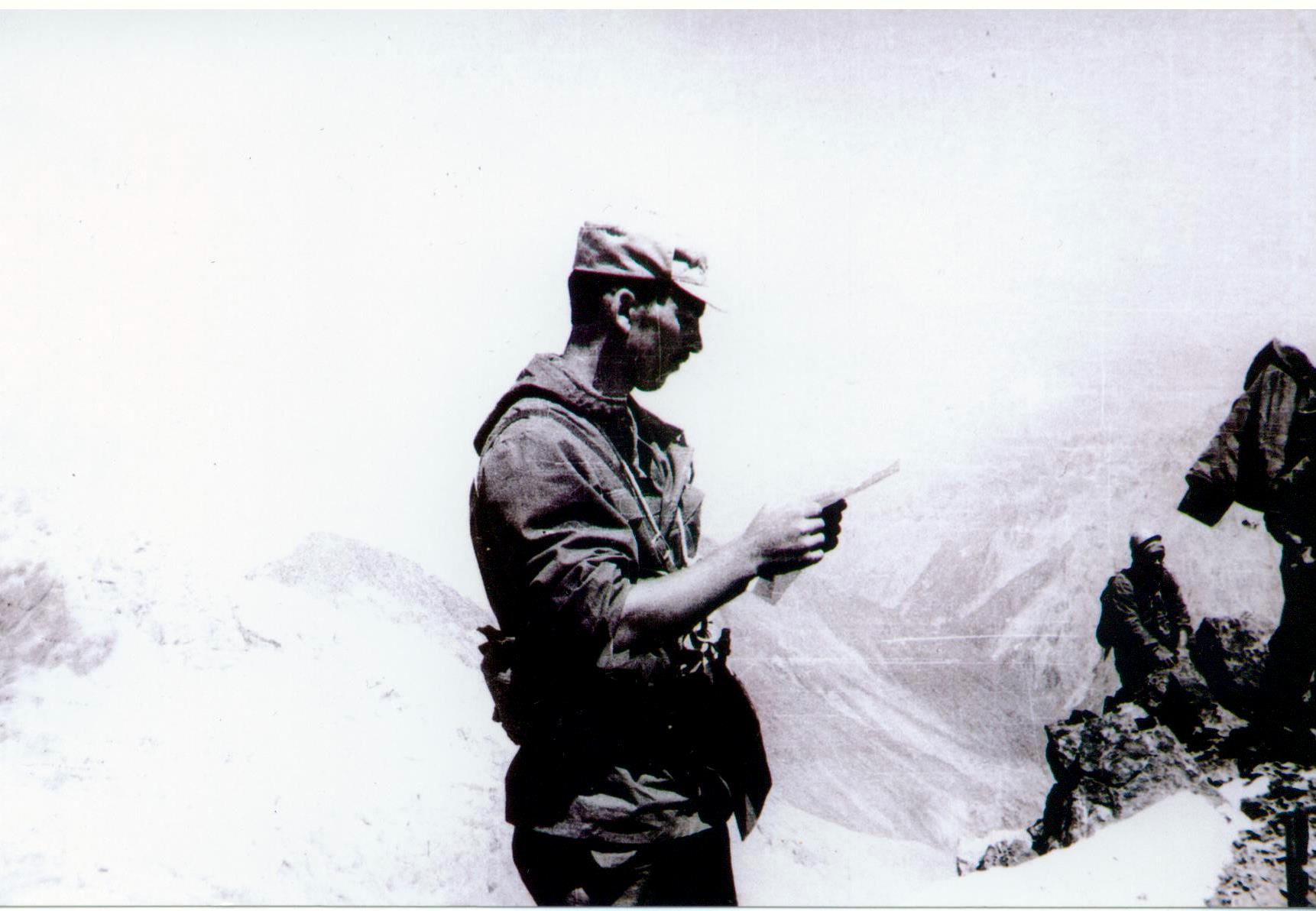
Sr. Lt. Leonid Khabarov wearing a Gorka in the Pamir Mountains during the Soviet-Afghan War

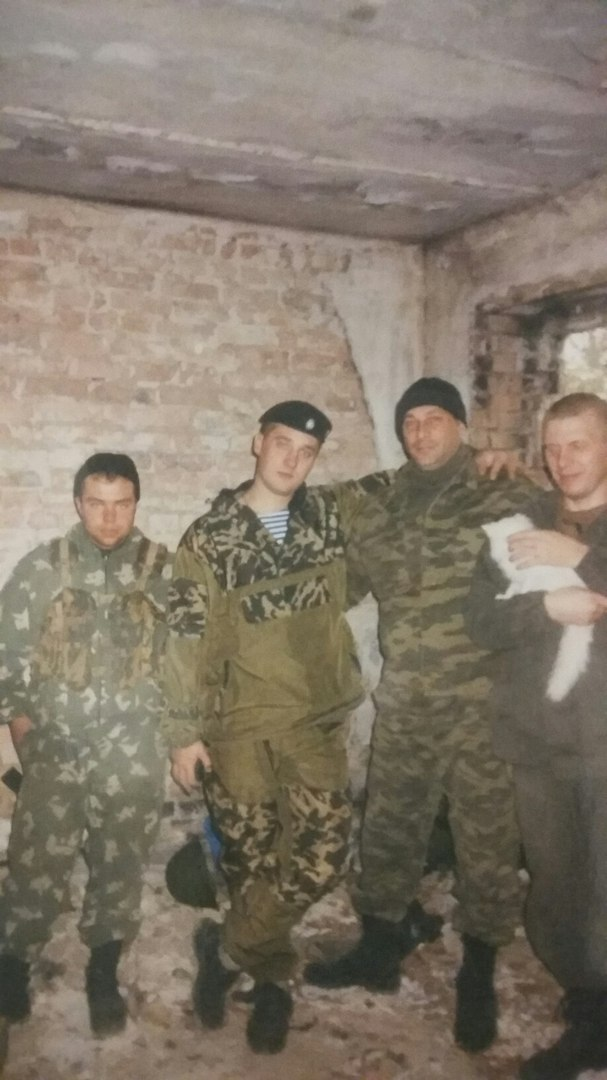
A Russian soldier (center) wearing a Barvikha camouflage Gorka during the Second Chechen War

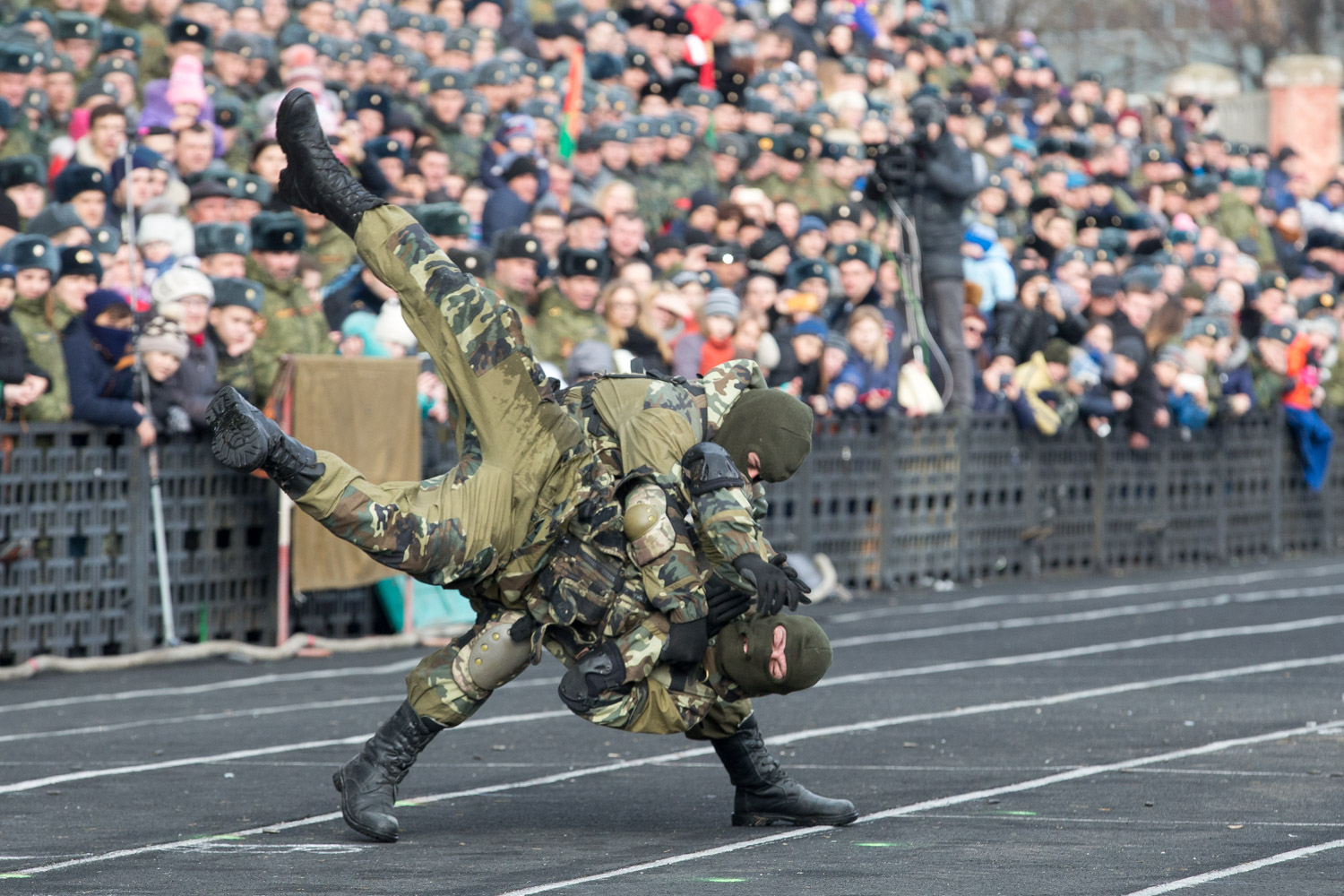
Transnistrian special forces wearing woodland Gorkas

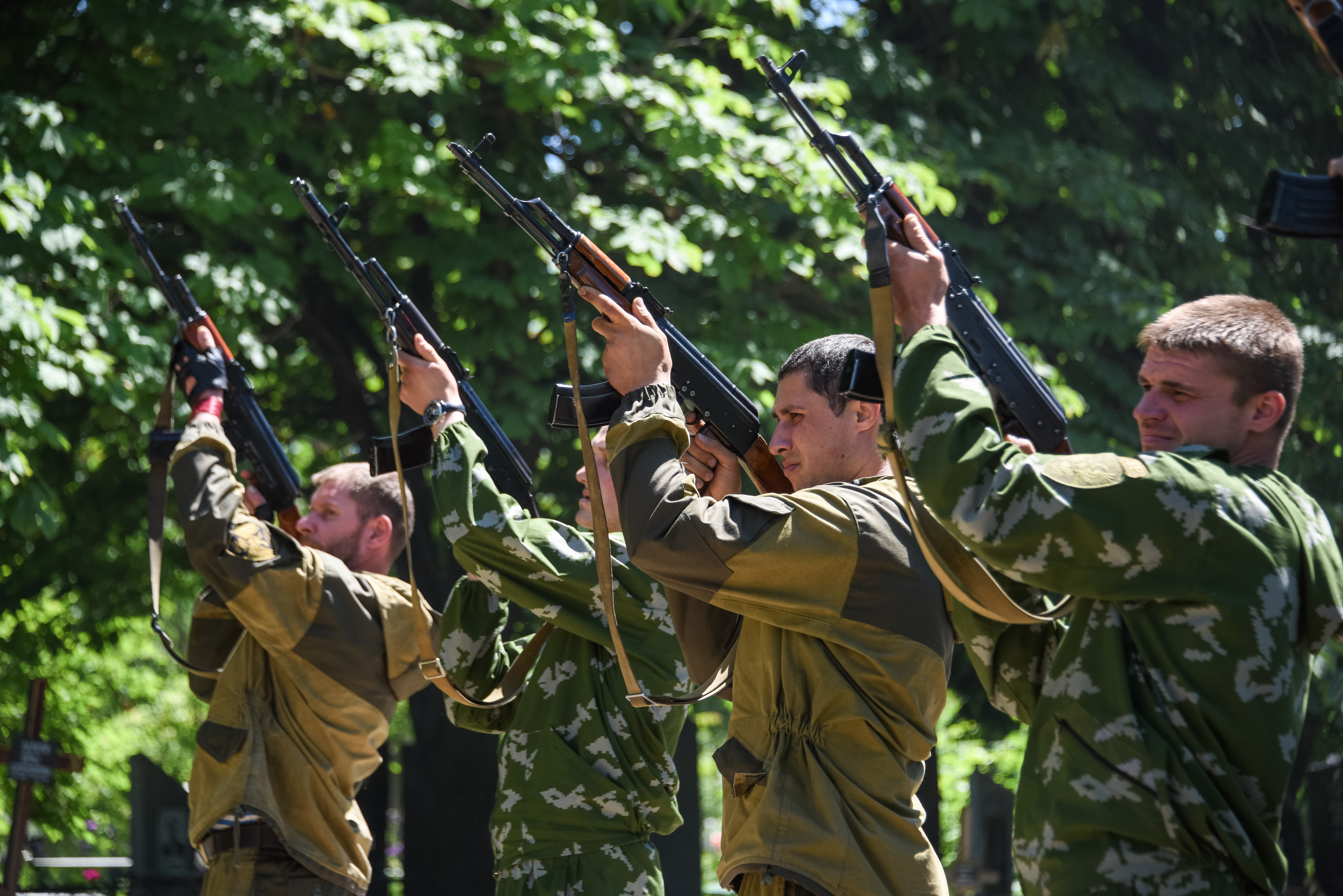
Pro-Russian rebels wearing Gorkas during a funeral near Donetsk

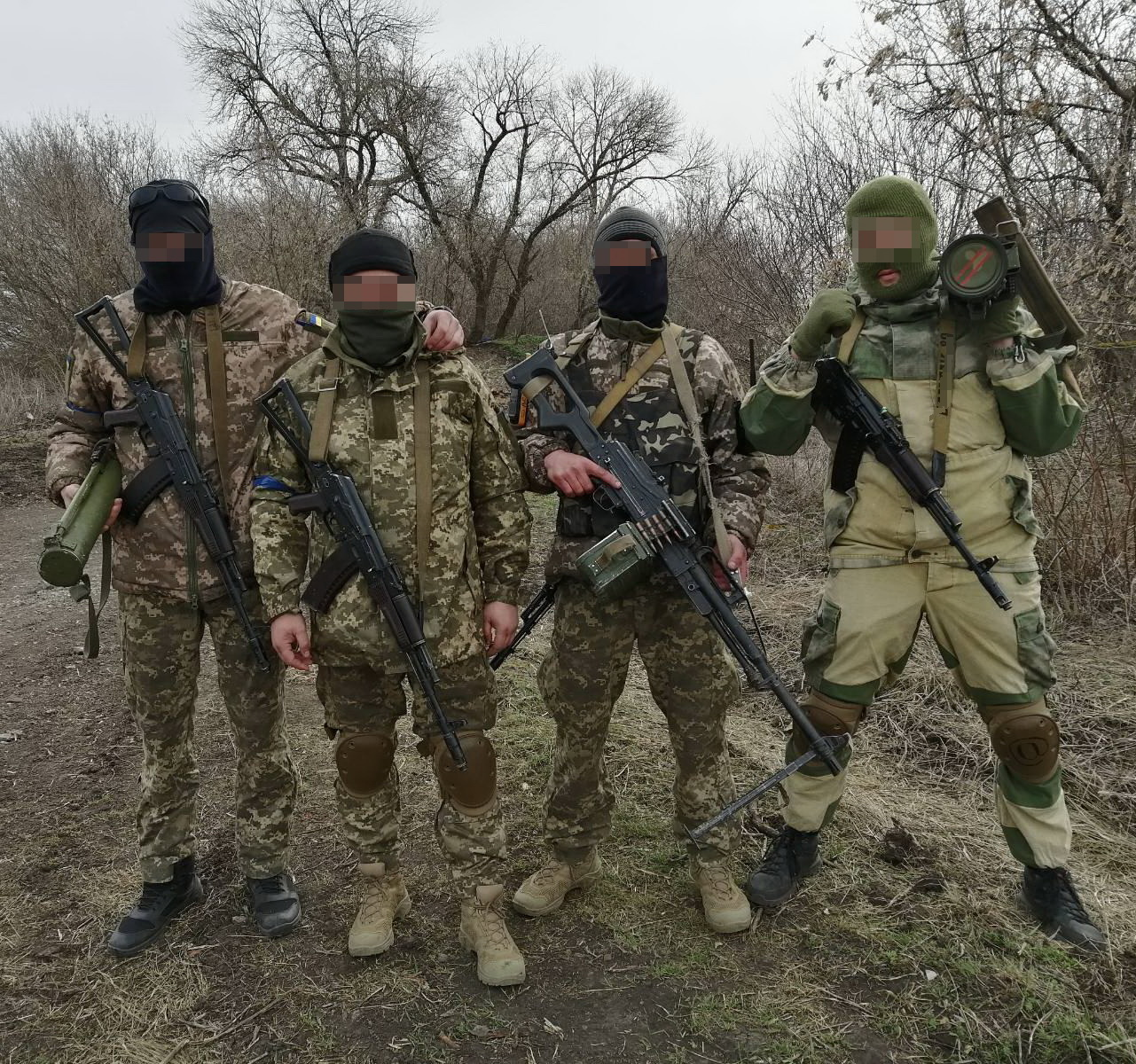
A soldier of the 3rd Heavy Mechanized Brigade wearing a Gorka (right)

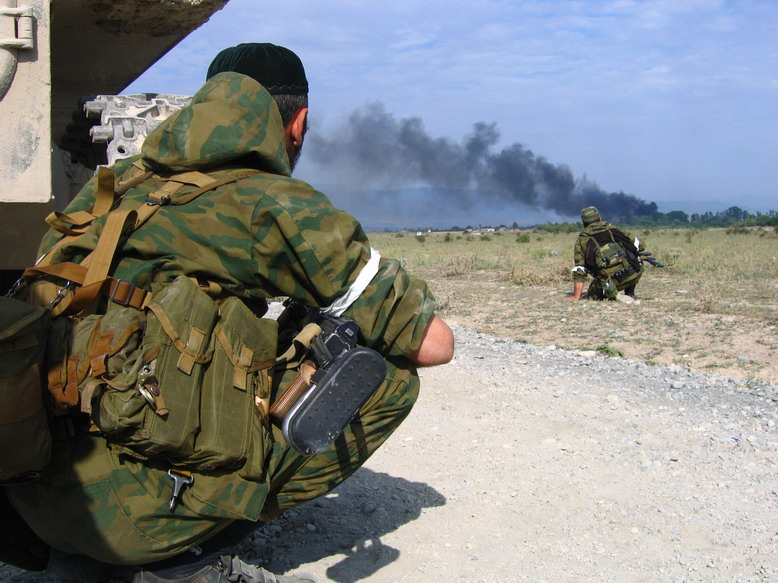
Soldier of the Vostok Battalion wearing a Flora Gorka

== In popular culture ==
The character Tachanka from Tom Clancy's Rainbow Six Siege wears a Gorka.

== See also ==
- VKPO uniform
- Extended Cold Weather Clothing System
- Battle Dress Uniform
- Windbreaker
- Anorak
- Windproof smock
