= Gorka, Tver Oblast =

Gorka Горка
- Village
- Location in Russia
- Coordinates: 58°17′16″N 36°45′57″E
- Country: Russia
- Federal subject: Tver Oblast
- Raion: Molokovsky District

Area
  - Total: 0.99 km^{2} (0.38 sq mi)

Population (2008)
  - Total: 58
  - Density: 59/km^{2} (150/sq mi)
- Postal code: 171685

Gorka (Russian: Горка) is a village along the Belaya River in Molokovsky District, Tver Oblast, Russia, formerly part of the abolished Molokosvky rural settlement municipality and located 17 kilometres north of the administrative center, Molokovo. According to Google Maps, Gorka has 7 small roads in its assigned area. According to the 2002 census, Gorka had 59 inhabitants, 31 men and 28 women, but this decreased to 58 inhabitants in 2008. Gorka has existed for over 162 years. In 1859 it had 22 households and 149 residents which increased in 1880 to 40 households and 253 residents but decreased in 1997 to 36 households and 93 residents.
