= Gorka, Staroselskoye Rural Settlement, Vologodsky District, Vologda Oblast =

Gorka Горка
- Village
- Location within Vologda Oblast Location within Russia
- Coordinates: 59°06′N 39°35′E
- Country: Russia
- Region: Vologda Oblast
- District: Vologodsky District
- Time zone: UTC+3:00

Gorka (Russian: Горка) is a rural locality (a village) in Staroselskoye Rural Settlement, Vologodsky District, Vologda Oblast, Russia. The population was 160 as of 2002.

== Geography ==
The distance to Vologda is 61 km, to Striznevo is 12 km. Yakovlevo, Isakovo, Dulovo are the nearest rural localities.
