= Molokovo, Totemsky District, Vologda Oblast =

Molokovo Молоково
- Village
- Location within Vologda Oblast Location within Russia
- Coordinates: 59°59′N 42°42′E
- Country: Russia
- Region: Vologda Oblast
- District: Totemsky District
- Time zone: UTC+3:00

Molokovo (Russian: Молоково) is a rural locality (a village) in Pyatovskoye Rural Settlement, Totemsky District, Vologda Oblast, Russia. The population was 6 as of 2002.

== Geography ==
Molokovo is located 7 km northwest of Totma (the district's administrative centre) by road. Ivoylovo is the nearest rural locality.
