= Gorka, Mayskoye Rural Settlement, Vologodsky District, Vologda Oblast =

Gorka Горка
- Village
- Location within Vologda Oblast Location within Russia
- Coordinates: 59°17′N 39°31′E
- Country: Russia
- Region: Vologda Oblast
- District: Vologodsky District
- Time zone: UTC+3:00

Gorka (Russian: Горка) is a rural locality (a village) in Mayskoye Rural Settlement, Vologodsky District, Vologda Oblast, Russia. The population was 26 as of 2002.

== Geography ==
The distance to Vologda is 28 km, to Maysky is 13 km. Semenkovo, Tretnikovo, Derevenka are the nearest localities, creek Mesha
