= Gorka, Krasavinskoye Rural Settlement, Velikoustyugsky District, Vologda Oblast =

Gorka Горка
- Village
- Location within Vologda Oblast Location within Russia
- Coordinates: 60°57′N 46°32′E
- Country: Russia
- Region: Vologda Oblast
- District: Velikoustyugsky District
- Time zone: UTC+3:00

Gorka (Russian: Горка) is a rural locality (a village) in Krasavinskoye Rural Settlement, Velikoustyugsky District, Vologda Oblast, Russia. The population was 14 as of 2002.

== Geography ==
The distance to Veliky Ustyug is 24 km.
