= Gorka, Gryazovetsky District, Vologda Oblast =

Gorka Горка
- Village
- Location within Vologda Oblast Location within Russia
- Coordinates: 58°49′N 40°12′E
- Country: Russia
- Region: Vologda Oblast
- District: Gryazovetsky District
- Time zone: UTC+3:00

Gorka (Russian: Горка) is a rural locality (a village) in Rostilovskoye Rural Settlement, Gryazovetsky District, Vologda Oblast, Russia. The population was 1 as of 2002.

== Geography ==
Gorka is located 8 km (5.0 mi) south of Gryazovets (the district's administrative centre) by road. Skomorokhovo is the nearest rural locality.
