= Górka =

Górka may refer to the following places:

- Górka, Lesser Poland Voivodeship (south Poland)
- Górka, Lubartów County in Lublin Voivodeship (east Poland)
- Górka, Podlaskie Voivodeship (north-east Poland)
- Górka, Gmina Tarnawatka, Tomaszów County in Lublin Voivodeship (east Poland)
- Górka, Łódź Voivodeship (central Poland)
- Górka-Zabłocie, village in eastern Poland
- Górka Jaklińska, village in southern Poland
- Górka Kościejowska, village in southern Poland
- Górka Lubartowska, village in eastern Poland
- Górka Pabianicka, village in central Poland
- Górka Powielińska, village in east-central Poland
- Górka Sobocka, village in south-west Poland
- Górka Stogniowska, village in southern Poland
- Górka Wieruszowska, village in central Poland
- Górka Wąsoska, village in south-west Poland
- Górka, Krotoszyn County in Greater Poland Voivodeship (west-central Poland)
- Górka, Leszno County in Greater Poland Voivodeship (west-central Poland)
- Górka, Oborniki County in Greater Poland Voivodeship (west-central Poland)
- Górka, Poznań County in Greater Poland Voivodeship (west-central Poland)
- Górka, Śrem County in Greater Poland Voivodeship (west-central Poland)
- Górka, Lubusz Voivodeship (west Poland)
- Górka, Pomeranian Voivodeship (north Poland)
- Górka, Gmina Ostróda in Warmian-Masurian Voivodeship (north Poland)
- Górka, West Pomeranian Voivodeship (north-west Poland)

== See also ==
- Gorka
