= Gorka, Naumovsky Selsoviet, Verkhovazhsky District, Vologda Oblast =

Gorka Горка
- Village
- Location within Vologda Oblast Location within Russia
- Coordinates: 60°44′N 42°18′E
- Country: Russia
- Region: Vologda Oblast
- District: Verkhovazhsky District
- Time zone: UTC+3:00

Gorka (Russian: Горка) is a rural locality (a village) in Nizhne-Vazhskoye Rural Settlement, Verkhovazhsky District, Vologda Oblast, Russia. The population was 3 as of 2002.

== Geography ==
The distance to Verkhovazhye is 17.2 km, to Naumikha is 19.1 km. Voronovskaya, Bezymyannaya, Zveglevitsy, Istopochnaya are the nearest rural localities.
