= Gorka, Mishutinskoye Rural Settlement, Vozhegodsky District, Vologda Oblast =

Gorka Горка
- Village
- Location within Vologda Oblast Location within Russia
- Coordinates: 60°29′N 41°09′E
- Country: Russia
- Region: Vologda Oblast
- District: Vozhegodsky District
- Time zone: UTC+3:00

Gorka (Russian: Горка) is a rural locality (a village) in Mishutinskoye Rural Settlement, Vozhegodsky District, Vologda Oblast, Russia. The population was 28 as of 2002.

== Geography ==
The distance to Vozhega is 61 km, to Mishutinskaya is 5 km. Lukyanovskaya, Klimovskaya, Pogorelka are the nearest rural localities.
