= Gorka, Kichmengsko-Gorodetsky District, Vologda Oblast =

Gorka Горка
- Village
- Location within Vologda Oblast Location within Russia
- Coordinates: 59°49′N 45°21′E
- Country: Russia
- Region: Vologda Oblast
- District: Kichmengsko-Gorodetsky District
- Time zone: UTC+3:00

Gorka (Russian: Горка) is a rural locality (a village) in Kichmengskoye Rural Settlement, Kichmengsko-Gorodetsky District, Vologda Oblast, Russia. The population was 22 as of 2002.

== Geography ==
Gorka is located 101 km southwest of Kichmengsky Gorodok (the district's administrative centre) by road. Fominsky is the nearest rural locality.
