= Oxford Russian Dictionary =

Bilingual dictionary of English and Russian

- Early 1992-1993 edition
- Language: English, Russian
- Series: Oxford dictionaries
- Publisher: Oxford University Press
- Media type: Book
- ISBN: 978-0-19-861420-3

The Oxford Russian Dictionary is a Russian–English and English–Russian bilingual dictionary published by Oxford University Press. It is one of the largest such dictionaries by termbase. The dictionary had several editions over the years, edited by Boris Unbegaun, Paul Falla, Marcus Wheeler, Colin Howlett and Della Thompson. Abridged editions titled Oxford Essential Russian Dictionary and Compact Oxford Russian Dictionary have been published as well.

== 1993 edition ==
The 1993 edition, with over 180,000 words and phrases, was compiled from the 1984 Oxford Russian–English Dictionary and Oxford English–Russian Dictionary.

== 1997 edition ==
The 1997 edition is an updated compilation of the 1972 Oxford Russian–English Dictionary and the 1984 Oxford English–Russian Dictionary.

== 2007 edition ==
The 2007 edition was updated with hundreds of new English and Russian words given language and culture changes in the previous few years. A review by The ATA Chronicle met the edition with some criticism, arguing that it provides fewer target terms than can be found in other dictionaries, such as Katzner's and the 2011 ABBYY Lingvo Comprehensive English-Russian Dictionary" and that "it also sometimes misses commonly used source terms".
