= Gorka, Termengsky Selsoviet, Verkhovazhsky District, Vologda Oblast =

Gorka Горка
- Village
- Location within Vologda Oblast Location within Russia
- Coordinates: 60°41′N 42°05′E
- Country: Russia
- Region: Vologda Oblast
- District: Verkhovazhsky District
- Time zone: UTC+3:00

Gorka (Russian: Горка) is a rural locality (a village) in Nizhne-Vazhskoye Rural Settlement, Verkhovazhsky District, Vologda Oblast, Russia. The population was 16 as of 2002.

== Geography ==
The distance to Verkhovazhye is 6.7 km, to Kukolovskaya is 5.4 km. Frolovskaya, Klykovo, Filinskaya are the nearest rural localities.
