= Molokovo, Perm Krai =

Molokovo Молоково
- Village
- Location within Perm Krai Location within Russia
- Coordinates: 57°56′N 56°37′E
- Country: Russia
- Region: Perm Krai
- District: Permsky District
- Time zone: UTC+5:00

Molokovo (Russian: Молоково) is a rural locality (a village) in Frolovskoye Rural Settlement, Permsky District, Perm Krai, Russia. The population was 29 as of 2010. There are 10 streets.

== Geography ==
Molokovo is located 31 km southeast of Perm (the district's administrative centre) by road. Simonki is the nearest rural locality.
