= Gorka, Vladimir Oblast =

Gorka Горка
- Settlement
- Location within Vladimir Oblast Location within Russia
- Coordinates: 56°14′N 38°47′E
- Country: Russia
- Region: Vladimir Oblast
- District: Kirzhachsky District
- Time zone: UTC+3:00

Gorka (Russian: Горка) is a rural locality (a settlement) and the administrative center of Gorkinskoye Rural Settlement, Kirzhachsky District, Vladimir Oblast, Russia. The population was 1,125 as of 2010. There are 20 streets.

== Geography ==
Gorka is located on the Sherna River, 15 km north of Kirzhach (the district's administrative centre) by road. Semyonovskoye is the nearest rural locality.
