= Jorge Neri =

Venezuelan-born Spanish lawyer and publisher

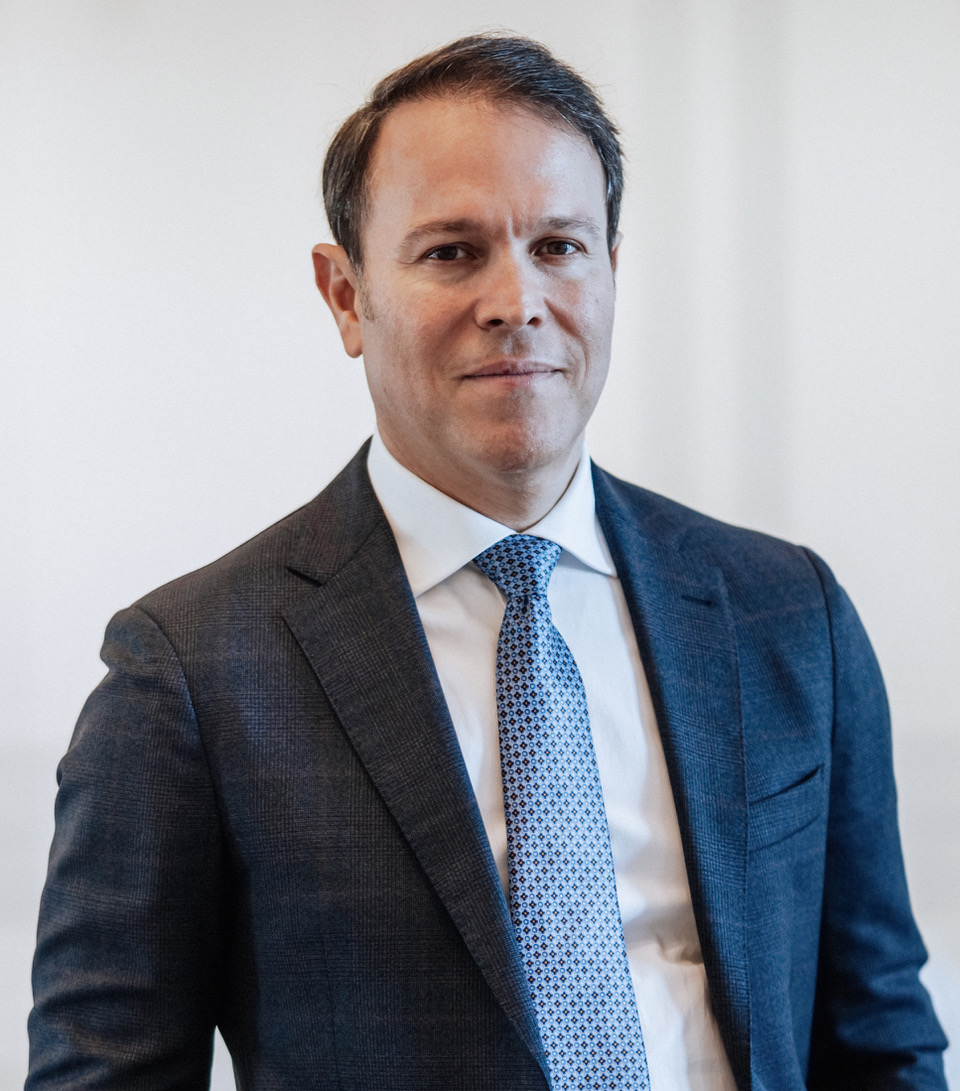
- Born: Caracas, Venezuela
- Education: Master's degree in Comparative Jurisprudence from New York University
- Alma mater: Law degree, Universidad Católica Andrés Bello
- Occupations: Lawyer and publisher
- Employer: Cambio 16
- Website: www.cambio16.com

Jorge Neri is a Venezuelan born lawyer, publisher, and businessman who is based in Spain. He is the editor and CEO of Cambio16, a platform for the transition to a sustainable economy of abundance. He has won several awards and recognition for his environmental activism, including the Green Cross at the United Nations Climate Change Conference.

== Early life and education ==
Jorge Neri received his law degree from the Universidad Católica Andrés Bello (1992). He obtained a Master's degree in Comparative Jurisprudence from New York University (1994), a degree in Business Management from the New York University Stern School of Business (1995) and a diploma in Business Negotiation (Oxford University, 2006).

== Career ==
Neri is a lawyer, publisher, and businessman based in Spain. Since 2013, he has been the editor and CEO of Cambio16, founded in 1971. At the helm of Cambio16, he has led the publication's transformation into a platform for sustainability with initiatives such as the "You Are My Hope" awards, the International Sustainability Congress, and Women For Hope. In 2023 he created the Fundación Cambiemos, a platform for personal, social and environmental change. The foundation was presented in Madrid in 2023 with the intervention of Sadhguru, Indian spiritual leader and environmental advocate, and Mario Alonso Puig, medical doctor and expert in emotional intelligence. In

In 2022, as part of the Venezuelan government's crackdown on independent journalism, with more than 400 media outlets shut down, the Venezuelan government issued an extradition order against Jorge Neri.

On 22 September 2025, Spain's National Court rejected the extradition request in a ruling, dismantling the political motivation behind the Venezuelan request, which was aimed at persecuting and silencing Neri, who for more than a decade has denounced the Maduro regime's systematic violations through Cambio16. The National Court also concluded that the charges in the extradition request did not constitute a crime.

As director of the magazine Cambio 16, he has been responsible for the promotion of environmental and humanist content and the creation of the "You are my hope" awards. I

== Recognition ==
Neri was named one of the 100 Most Committed Latinos to Climate Action in 2020, 2021, and 2025 by the Florida-based NGO Sachamama.

In 2020, Cambio16 received a World Jurist Association award in the category "Defence of Democracy".

In 2022, Neri received the Climate Positive Award from Green Cross UK at the 27th United Nations Climate Change Conference.
