= Gorka, Lipetskoye Rural Settlement, Verkhovazhsky District, Vologda Oblast =

Gorka Горка
- Village
- Location within Vologda Oblast Location within Russia
- Coordinates: 60°25′N 41°40′E
- Country: Russia
- Region: Vologda Oblast
- District: Verkhovazhsky District
- Time zone: UTC+3:00

Gorka (Russian: Горка) is a rural locality (a village) in Lipetskoye Rural Settlement, Verkhovazhsky District, Vologda Oblast, Russia. The population was 18 as of 2002.

== Geography ==
The distance to Verkhovazhye is 69.7 km, to Leushinskaya is 2 km. Leushinskaya, Ivonino, Svetilnovo, Sloboda are the nearest rural localities.
