= USS Walter S. Gorka =

1945 Crosley-class high speed transport

History

United States
- Name: USS Walter S. Gorka
- Namesake: Aviation Ordnanceman Third Class Walter S. Gorka (1922-1942), a U.S. Navy sailor and Air Medal recipient
- Builder: Bethlehem-Hingham Shipyard, Inc., Hingham, Massachusetts
- Laid down: 3 April 1945
- Launched: 26 May 1945
- Sponsored by: Mrs. Josephine B. Gorka
- Commissioned: 7 August 1945
- Decommissioned: January 1947
- Reclassified: From destroyer escort (DE-604) to high-speed transport (APD-114) while under construction
- Stricken: 1 June 1960
- Fate: Sold to Ecuador August 1961 for use as floating power plant
- Notes: Laid down as Rudderow-class destroyer escort USS Walter S. Gorka (DE-604)

General characteristics
- Class & type: Crosley-class high speed transport
- Displacement: 2,130 long tons (2,164 t) full
- Length: 306 ft (93 m)
- Beam: 37 ft (11 m)
- Draft: 12 ft 7 in (3.84 m)
- Speed: 23 knots (43 km/h; 26 mph)
- Troops: 162
- Complement: 204
- Armament: 1 × 5 in (130 mm) gun; 6 × 40 mm guns; 6 × 20 mm guns; 2 × depth charge tracks

USS Walter S. Gorka (APD-114), ex-DE-604, was a United States Navy high-speed transport in commission from 1945 to 1947.

== Namesake ==
Walter Stanley Gorka was born on 24 March 1922 in Windsor Locks, Connecticut. He enlisted in the United States Naval Reserve at Hartford, Connecticut, on 15 May 1940 and eventually attained the rate of aviation ordnanceman third class.

During Operation Torch, the Allied amphibious landings in North Africa, Gorka was a bombardier and gunner on a Grumman TBF Avenger torpedo bomber of Escort Scouting Squadron 27 (VGS-27) embarked on auxiliary aircraft carrier USS Suwannee. On 10 November 1942, Gorka went on an attack mission against a Vichy French submarine. French antiaircraft shot down Gorka's aircraft and he was killed. He was posthumously awarded the Air Medal.

== Construction and commissioning ==
Walter S. Gorka was laid down as the Rudderow-class destroyer escort USS Walter S. Gorka (DE-604) on 20 March 1945 by Bethlehem-Hingham Shipyard, Inc., at Hingham, Massachusetts. She was reclassified as a Crosley-class high-speed transport and redesignated APD-114 during construction, and was launched on 26 May 1945, sponsored by Mrs. Josephine B. Gorka. Walter S. Gorka was commissioned on 7 August 1945, with Commander R. G. Werner, USNR, .

== Service history ==
Walter S. Gorka was still fitting out when the surrender of Japan ended World War II on 15 August 1945. Following fitting out, she conducted shakedown training in Guantanamo Bay, Cuba, from 2 September 1945 to 27 September 1945 and subsequently carried some 140 officers and enlisted men from Guantanamo Bay to the United States.

Upon her arrival in the United States, Walter S. Gorka was ordered to remain in commission, in reserve, in the St. Johns River with the Florida Group of the Atlantic Reserve Fleet at Green Cove Springs, Florida. She served there as headquarters ship during the deactivation of several of her sister ships.

== Decommissioning and disposal ==
Walter S. Gorka herself was decommissioned at Green Cove Springs in January 1947, and remained there, inactive, until stricken from the Navy List on 1 June 1960. She subsequently was sold to the government of Ecuador for conversion and use as a floating power plant.
