= Kreis Meseritz =

Kreis Meseritz (1818 - 1939) Landkreis Meseritz (1939 - 1945)
- District
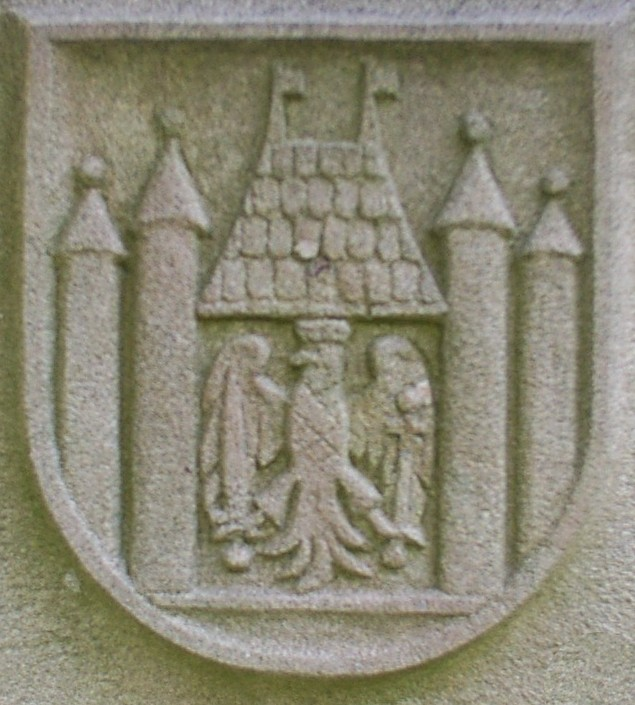
- Coat of arms

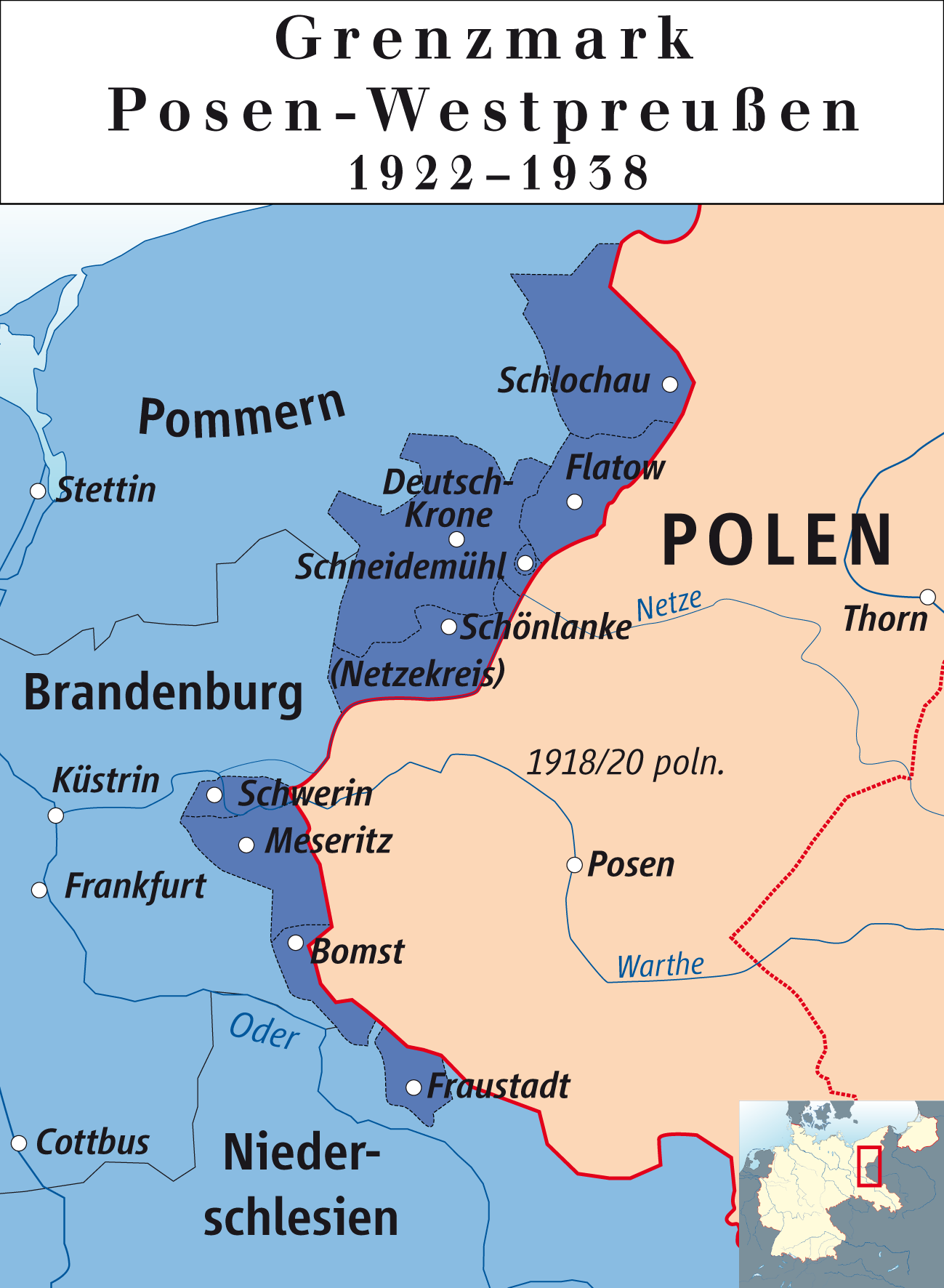
- Country: Germany
- State: Prussia, Kingdom (till 1918); Prussia, Free State (till 1945)
- Province: Posen Gr. Duchy (till 1848), then Posen Prov. (till 1920), then Posen-West Prussia (till 1938), then Brandenburg (till 1945)
- Founded: 1818
- Disbanded: 1945
- Capital: Meseritz

Area
  - Total: 706.49 km^{2} (272.78 sq mi)

Population (1944)
  - Total: 35,155
  - Density: 49.760/km^{2} (128.88/sq mi)
- Time zone: UTC+01:00 (CET)
  - Summer (DST): UTC+02:00 (CEST)

Meseritz district (1818 - 1920)

Meseritz district (1920 - 1945)

Kreis Meseritz (Landkreis Meseritz from 1939; Polish: Powiat międzyrzecki) was a district in Prussia, first in the southern administrative Region of Posen within the Grand Duchy of Posen (till 1848), then the Province of Posen (till 1920), then within the Province of Posen-West Prussia (till 1938) and at last as part of the administrative Region of Frankfurt within the Province of Brandenburg (till 1945). Its former territory presently lies in the eastern part of the Lubusz Voivodeship, a region of Poland, roughly resembling the extent of the present Międzyrzecz County.

== History ==
When the area later forming the territory of the Kreis Meseritz was first annexed to Prussia from 1793 to 1807 it formed the Meseritzer Kreis (Meseritz district) within the Province of South Prussia, then governed by the Departement der Kriegs- und Domänen-Kammer zu Posen (Department of the chamber of war and domains at Posen).

After being part of the Duchy of Warsaw, the area returned to Prussia as a result of the Congress of Vienna. The Kreis Meseritz came into existence on 1 January 1818 after separation from Kreis Birnbaum. In 1837 it measured 21.78 Prussian square miles (1,292.5 square kilometres (499.0 sq mi)). It consisted mostly of the rural territories around the town of Meseritz. It became part of the North German Confederation in 1867 and of the German Empire when it was founded in 1871.

After World War I, the administration had to be reorganized because the Region of Posen was split. Thus the eastern part of the district was handed over to Poland in 1920, according to the Versailles treaty. In 1920, the remaining district, measuring 706.49 square kilometres (272.78 sq mi), joined the newly founded Regierungsbezirk Schneidemühl, which became part of the Province of the Frontier March of Posen-West Prussia, established in 1922. Together with Kreis Bomst and Kreis Schwerin the Kreis Meseritz formed a western territorial exclave of Posen-West Prussia. When that province was dissolved in 1938, the bulk of its territory, anyway neighboring Pomerania, was merged into that province, whereas its western exclave including Meseritz became part of Brandenburg. In 1945, the Landkreis Meseritz was occupied by the Red Army and was integrated into Poland.

== Demographics ==
The district had a German majority population, with a significant Polish minority. After 1920, with the loss of the eastern part of the district to Poland, the remainder of the district in Germany had a Polish minority of 5.8% (including bilinguals), according to the 1925 census.

	Population	German		Polish / Bilingual / Other	
1831	33,066	27,578	83.4%	5,488	16.6%
1834	35,160	28,856	82.1%	6,394	17.9%
1900	49,822	39,456	79.2%	10,366	20.8%
1905	50,996	40,176	78.8%	10,820	21.2%
1910	53,306	41,059	77.0%	12,247	23.0%

== Civil registry offices ==
In 1905, these civil registry offices (German: Standesamt) served the following towns in Kreis Meseritz:

- Altvorwerk
- Bauchwitz
- Bentschen
- Betsche
- Brätz
- Friedenhorst
- Kurzig
- Kranz
- Lowin
- Meseritz
- Rogsen
- Tirschtiegel
- Paradies
- Weißensee
