= Nietoperek =

Village in Lubusz Voivodeship, Poland

- Village
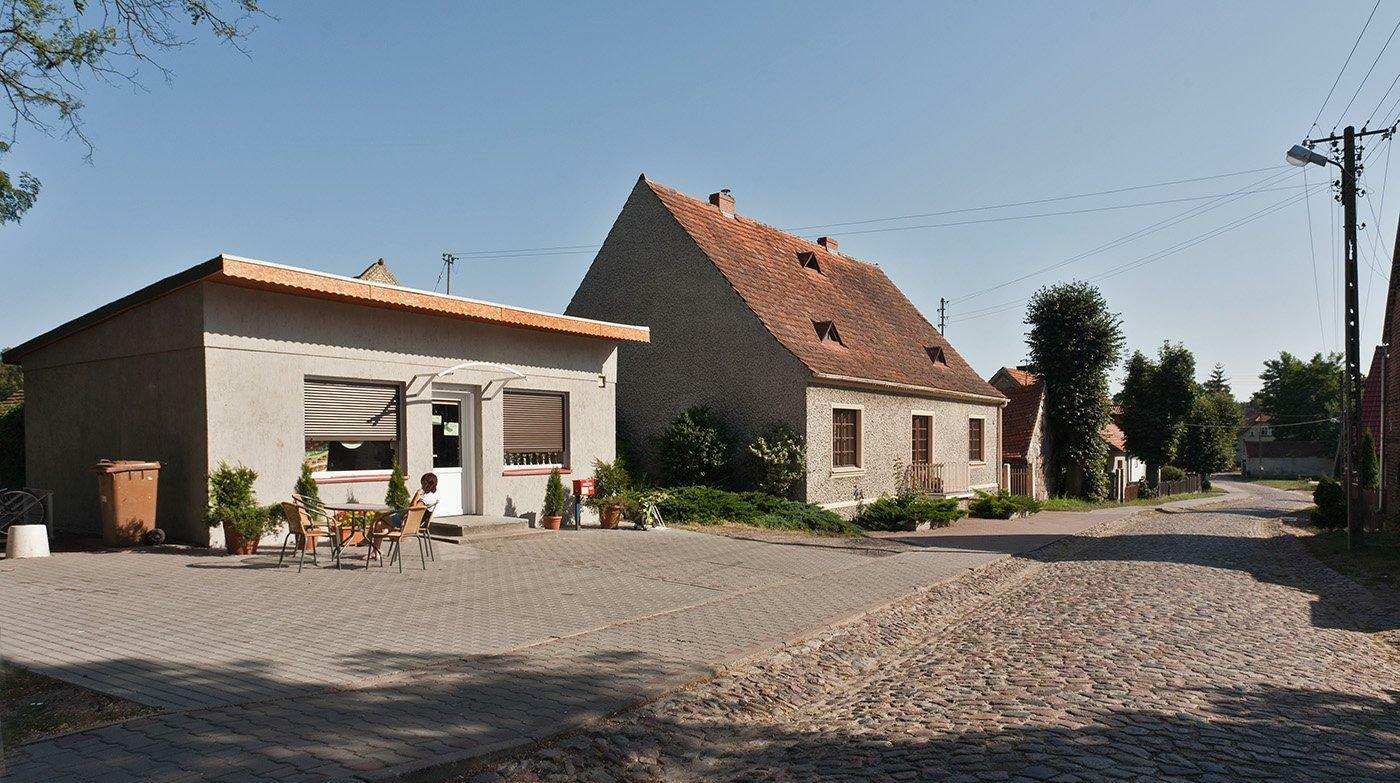

- Location within Poland
- Coordinates: 52°24′N 15°32′E
- Country: Poland
- Voivodeship: Lubusz
- County: Międzyrzecz
- Gmina: Międzyrzecz
- Elevation: 75 m (246 ft)
- Population (March 2011): 263

Nietoperek [ɲɛtɔˈpɛrɛk] is a village in the administrative district of Gmina Międzyrzecz, within Międzyrzecz County, Lubusz Voivodeship, in western Poland.

== Sports ==
- KS Inter Nietoperek – men's football club (Polish league level 8)

== See also ==
- Regenwurmlager
