= Kęszyca =

- Village
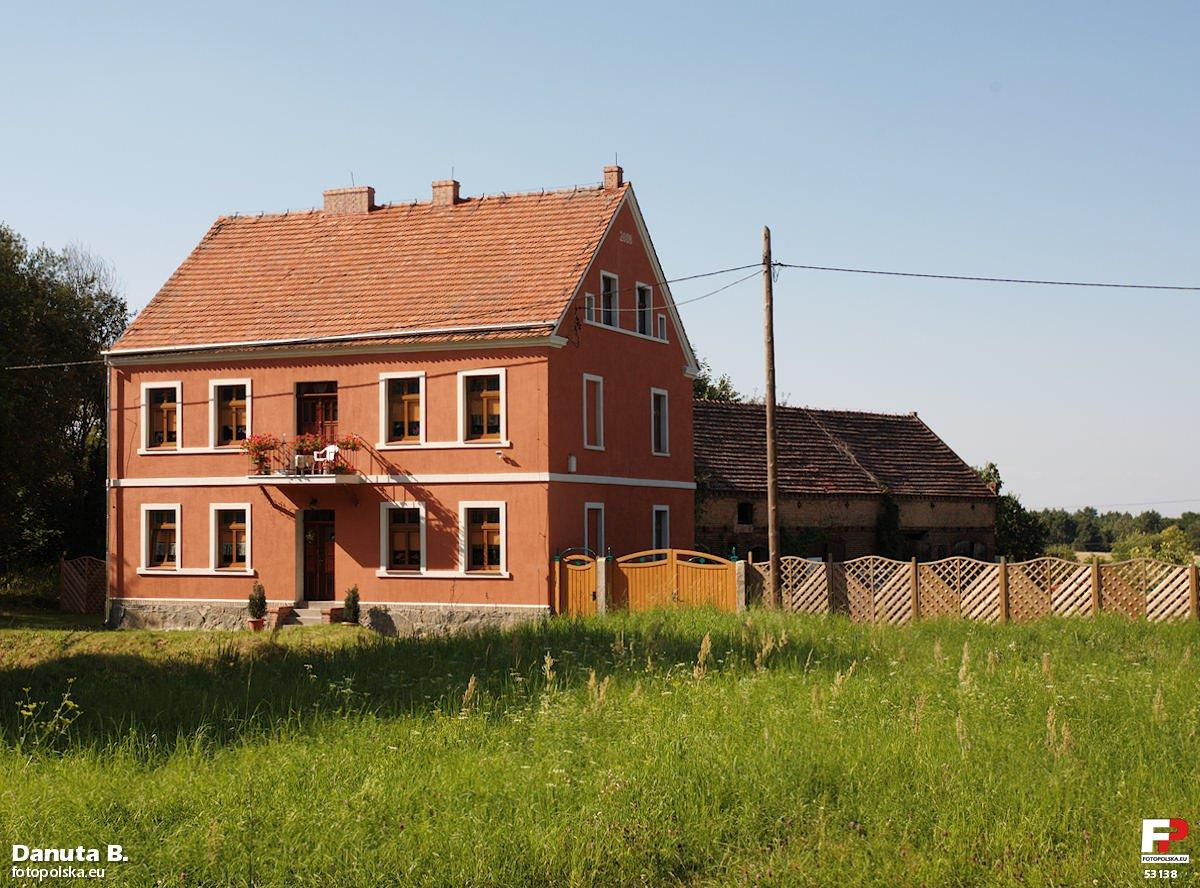

- Location within Poland
- Coordinates: 52°24′37″N 15°30′23″E
- Country: Poland
- Voivodeship: Lubusz
- County: Międzyrzecz
- Gmina: Międzyrzecz
- Population (March 2011): 106

Kęszyca [kɛ̃ˈʂɨt͡sa] is a village in the administrative district of Gmina Międzyrzecz, within Międzyrzecz County, Lubusz Voivodeship, in western Poland.

== Names ==
The earliest known mention of the place was in a 1328 document (19th century copy) under the name Gantzitz, 1390: Kanszyc, 1405: Kantzicz, Canshicze, 1423: Canszyca, 1443 Kaschycza, 1446 Chanzicze, 1452 Kasicza, 1458 Canszycza, 1462 Cashicze, 1467 Cansicze, 1468 Kanshicza, 1480 Kanszycze, 1499 Canszycze, Caszycza, 1508 Kanszycza, 1510 Canschicze, 1512 Cassicza, 1517 Kanzicze, Kashycze, 1519 Kansycza, 1565 Kesziczi, Kęsicza, Kęssiczi, 1944 Kainscht

== See also ==
- Regenwurmlager
