= Kaława =

- Village
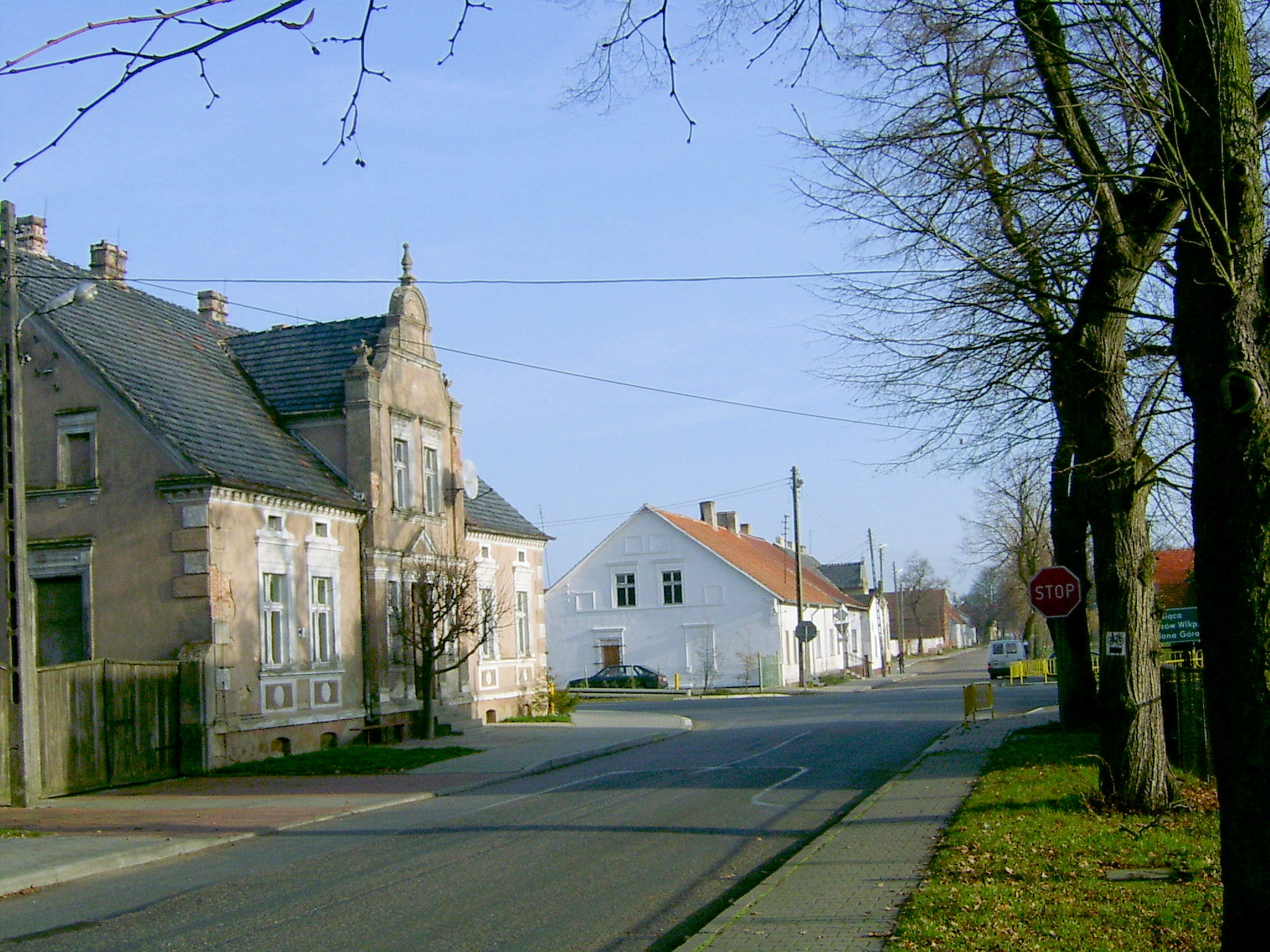
- Main road

- Location within Poland
- Coordinates: 52°22′N 15°31′E
- Country: Poland
- Voivodeship: Lubusz
- County: Międzyrzecz
- Gmina: Międzyrzecz
- Time zone: UTC+1 (CET)
  - Summer (DST): UTC+2 (CEST)
- Vehicle registration: FMI

Kaława [kaˈwava] is a village in the administrative district of Gmina Międzyrzecz, within Międzyrzecz County, Lubusz Voivodeship, in western Poland. It is located on National road 3, a component of European route E65, which today is upgraded as the Expressway S3 bypass road.

== History ==
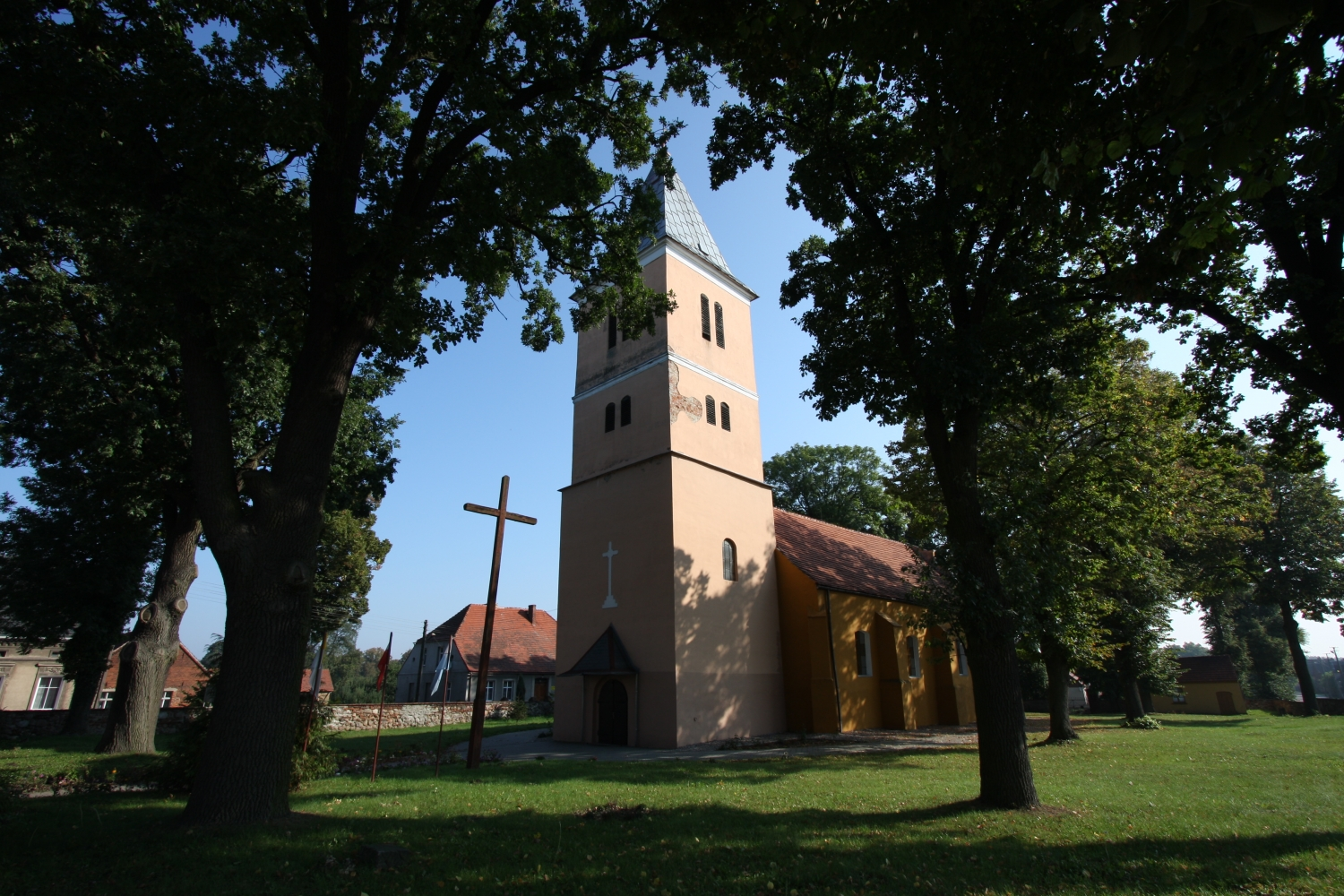
St Nicholas Church

As part of the region of Greater Poland, i.e. the cradle of the Polish state, the area formed part of Poland since its establishment in the 10th century. The village was mentioned in 1257 as a property of the Cistercian abbey of Gościkowo. The Gothic parish church was established by 1510. Kaława administratively located in the Poznań County in the Poznań Voivodeship in the Greater Poland Province. The church was plundered by the Swedish troops which Field Marshal Arvid Wittenberg led into Poland during the Second Northern War in 1655 and afterwards was rebuilt in a Baroque style.

In the 1793 Second Partition of Poland Kaława was annexed by the Kingdom of Prussia. After the successful Greater Poland uprising of 1806, it was regained by Poles and included within the short-lived Duchy of Warsaw, and after the duchy's dissolution in 1815, the village was reannexed by Prussia, and made part of Kreis Meseritz in 1818. In the 1930s the central parts of the German Festungsfront Oder-Warthe-Bogen military defence (Werkgruppe Scharnhorst) were laid out west of the village, they were overcome by Soviet Red Army forces during the Vistula–Oder Offensive on 29–30 January 1945. Following the war, Kaława became again part of Poland.

In 1975–98 the village belonged to Gorzów Voivodeship.
