= Karolewo, Lubusz Voivodeship =

Karolewo
- Village
- Location within Poland
- Coordinates: 52°25′40″N 15°40′22″E
- Country: Poland
- Voivodeship: Lubusz
- County: Międzyrzecz
- Gmina: Międzyrzecz
- Population: 16

Karolewo [karɔˈlɛvɔ] is a village in the administrative district of Gmina Międzyrzecz, within Międzyrzecz County, Lubusz Voivodeship, in western Poland.
