= Kuźnik, Lubusz Voivodeship =

Kuźnik
- Village
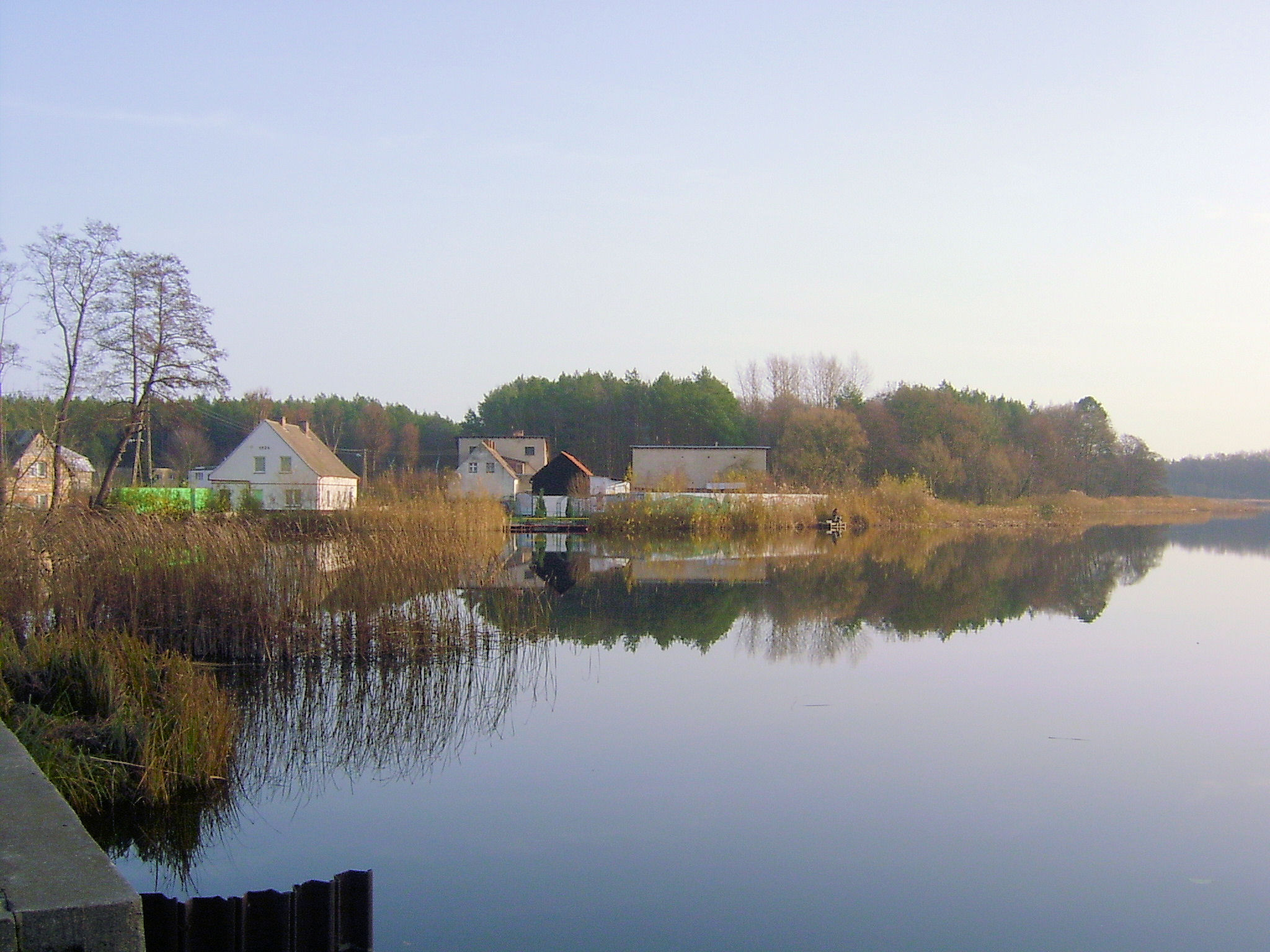

- Location within Poland
- Coordinates: 52°25′N 15°37′E
- Country: Poland
- Voivodeship: Lubusz
- County: Międzyrzecz
- Gmina: Międzyrzecz
- Population: 42

Kuźnik [ˈkuʑnik] is a village in the administrative district of Gmina Międzyrzecz, within Międzyrzecz County, Lubusz Voivodeship, in western Poland.
