= Rojewo, Lubusz Voivodeship =

Rojewo
- Village
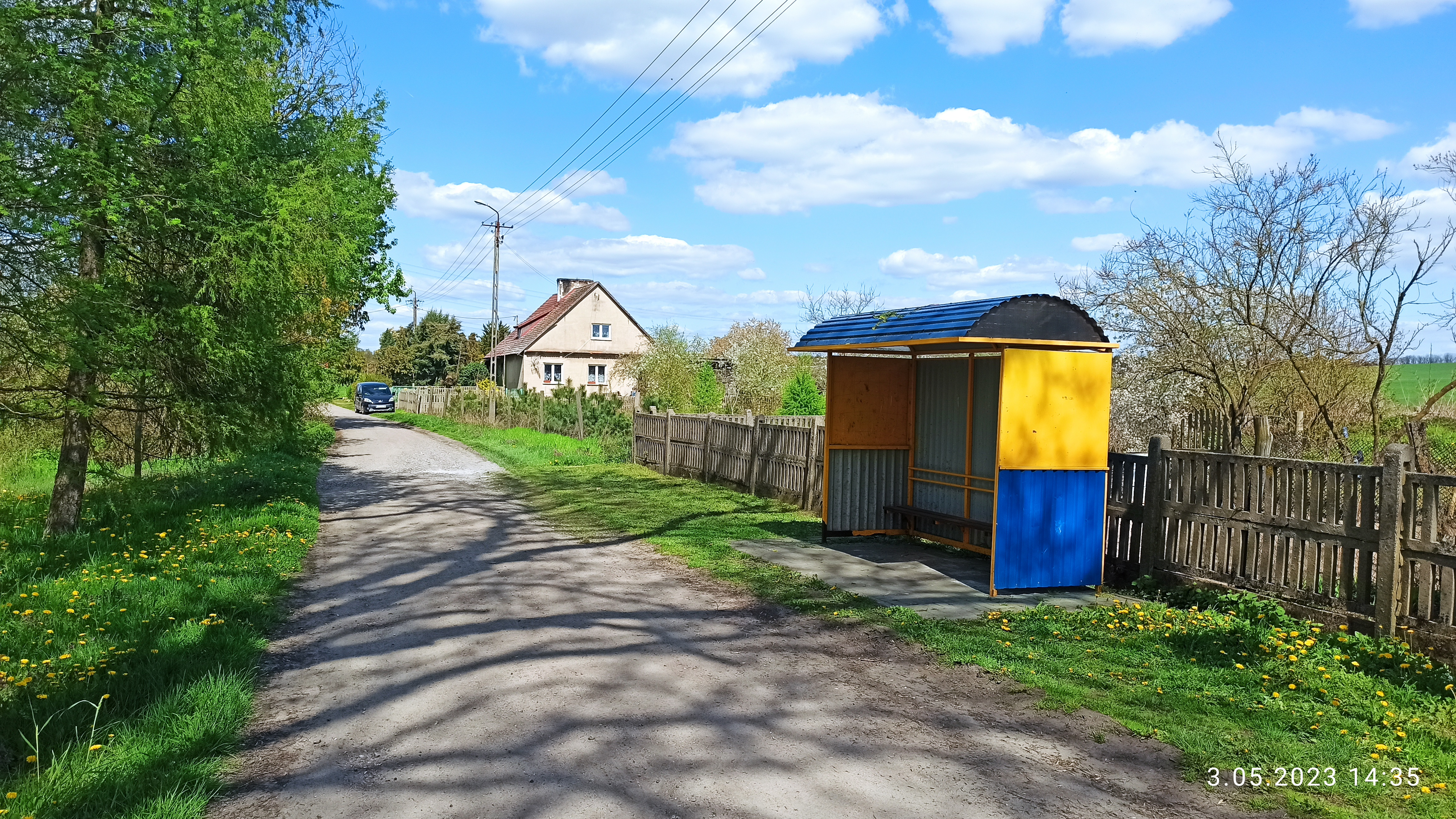

- Location within Poland
- Coordinates: 52°31′N 15°33′E
- Country: Poland
- Voivodeship: Lubusz
- County: Międzyrzecz
- Gmina: Międzyrzecz

Rojewo [rɔˈjɛvɔ] is a village in the administrative district of Gmina Międzyrzecz, within Międzyrzecz County, Lubusz Voivodeship, in western Poland.
