= Bobowicko =

- Village
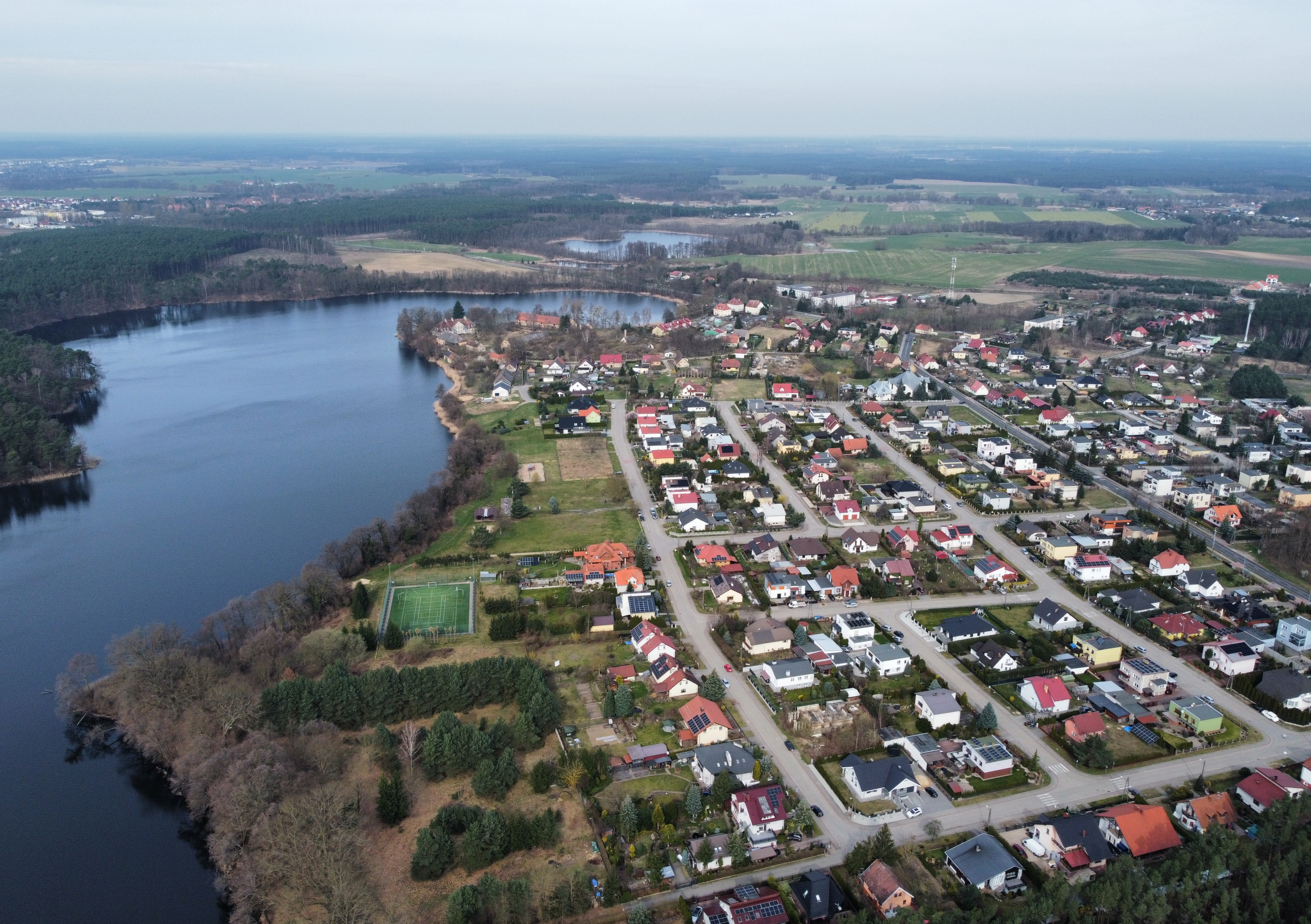
- Aerial view of Bobowicko

- Location within Poland
- Coordinates: 52°26′N 15°38′E
- Country: Poland
- Voivodeship: Lubusz
- County: Międzyrzecz
- Gmina: Międzyrzecz

Population (2008)
  - Total: 714
- Time zone: UTC+1 (CET)
  - Summer (DST): UTC+2 (CEST)
- Postal code: 66-300
- Vehicle registration: FMI

Bobowicko [bɔbɔˈvit͡skɔ] is a village in the administrative district of Gmina Międzyrzecz, within Międzyrzecz County, Lubusz Voivodeship, in western Poland.

Bobowicko was a private village, administratively located in the Poznań County in the Poznań Voivodeship in the Greater Poland Province of the Kingdom of Poland.

== Sports ==
- GKS Favor Bobowicko (founded in 1999) – men's football club (Polish league level 7)
