= Kolonia Nietoperek =

- Village
- Location within Poland
- Coordinates: 52°23′15″N 15°32′15″E
- Country: Poland
- Voivodeship: Lubusz
- County: Międzyrzecz
- Gmina: Międzyrzecz

Kolonia Nietoperek [kɔˈlɔɲa ɲɛtɔˈpɛrɛk] is a village in the administrative district of Gmina Międzyrzecz, within Międzyrzecz County, Lubusz Voivodeship, in western Poland.
