= Skoki, Lubusz Voivodeship =

Skoki
- Village
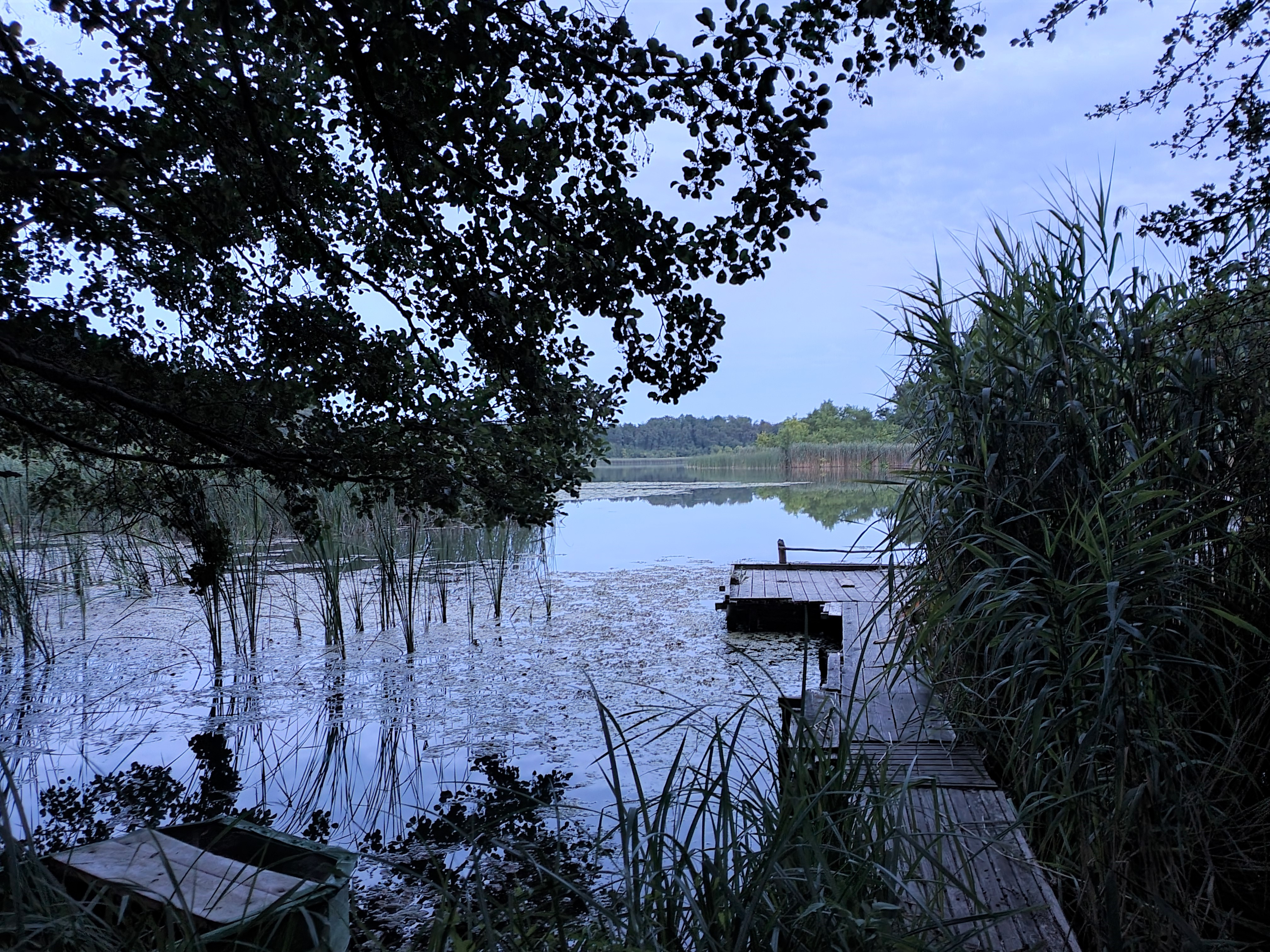

- Location within Poland
- Coordinates: 52°25′1″N 15°37′8″E
- Country: Poland
- Voivodeship: Lubusz
- County: Międzyrzecz
- Gmina: Międzyrzecz
- Population: 50

Skoki [ˈskɔki] is a village in the administrative district of Gmina Międzyrzecz, within Międzyrzecz County, Lubusz Voivodeship, in western Poland.
