= Szumiąca, Lubusz Voivodeship =

Szumiąca
- Village
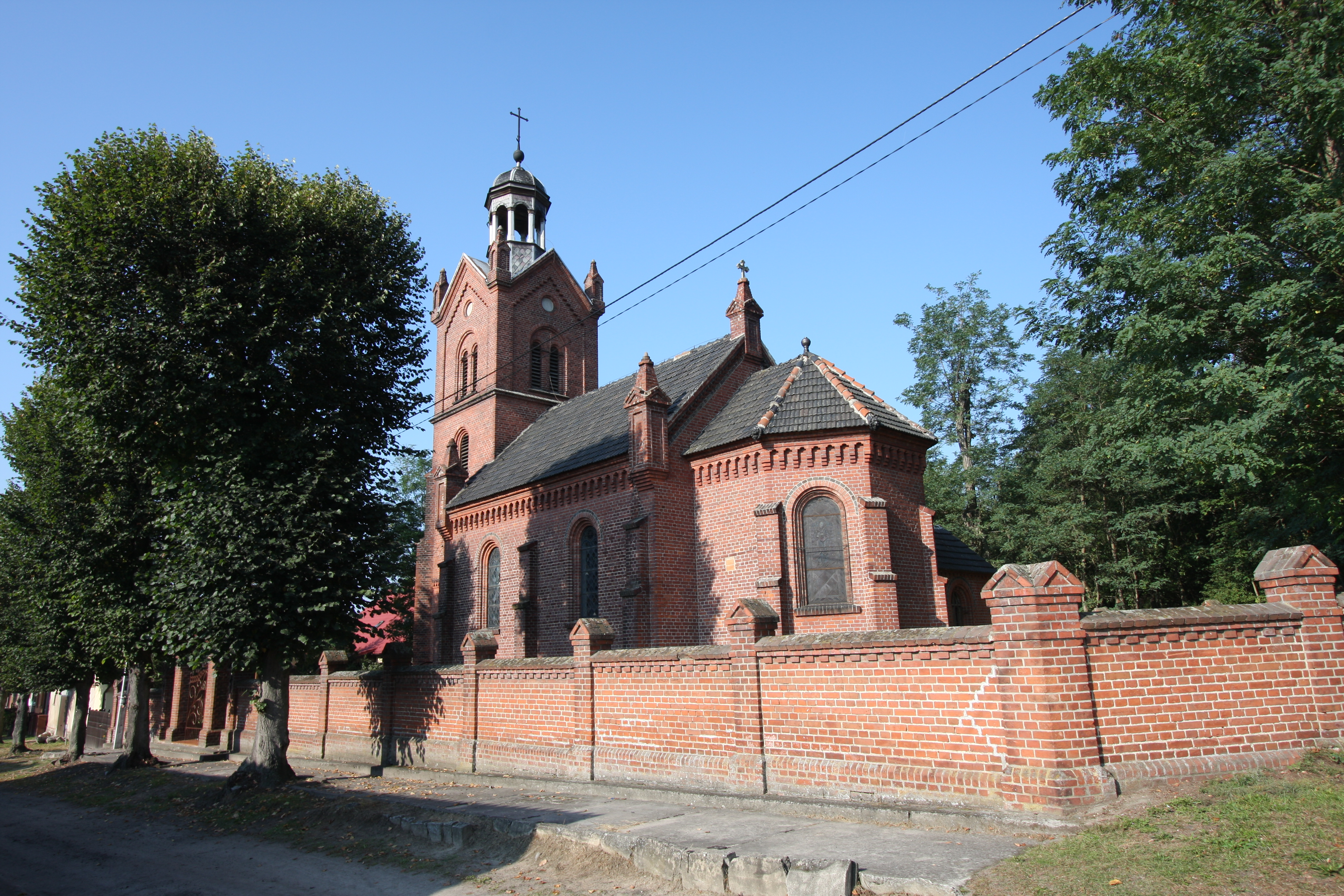
- Church of Saint Joseph

- Location within Poland
- Coordinates: 52°21′N 15°35′E
- Country: Poland
- Voivodeship: Lubusz
- County: Międzyrzecz
- Gmina: Międzyrzecz

Szumiąca [ʂuˈmjɔnt͡sa] (formerly German Schindelmühl) is a village in the administrative district of Gmina Międzyrzecz, within Międzyrzecz County, Lubusz Voivodeship, in western Poland.
