= Kęszyca-Kolonia =

- Village
- Location within Poland
- Coordinates: 52°26′7″N 15°31′48″E
- Country: Poland
- Voivodeship: Lubusz
- County: Międzyrzecz
- Gmina: Międzyrzecz
- Population: 10

Kęszyca-Kolonia [kɛ̃ˈʂɨt͡sa kɔˈlɔɲa] is a village in the administrative district of Gmina Międzyrzecz, within Międzyrzecz County, Lubusz Voivodeship, in western Poland.
