= Lubosinek =

- Village
- Location within Poland
- Coordinates: 52°27′N 15°35′E
- Country: Poland
- Voivodeship: Lubusz
- County: Międzyrzecz
- Gmina: Międzyrzecz

Lubosinek [lubɔˈɕinɛk] is a village in the administrative district of Gmina Międzyrzecz, within Międzyrzecz County, Lubusz Voivodeship, in western Poland.
