= Wojciechówek =

- Village
- Location within Poland
- Coordinates: 52°26′35″N 15°31′37″E
- Country: Poland
- Voivodeship: Lubusz
- County: Międzyrzecz
- Gmina: Międzyrzecz
- Population: 30

Wojciechówek (Polish pronunciation: [vɔjt͡ɕɛˈxuvɛk]) is a village in the administrative district of Gmina Międzyrzecz, within Międzyrzecz County, Lubusz Voivodeship, in western Poland.
