= Święty Wojciech =

- Village
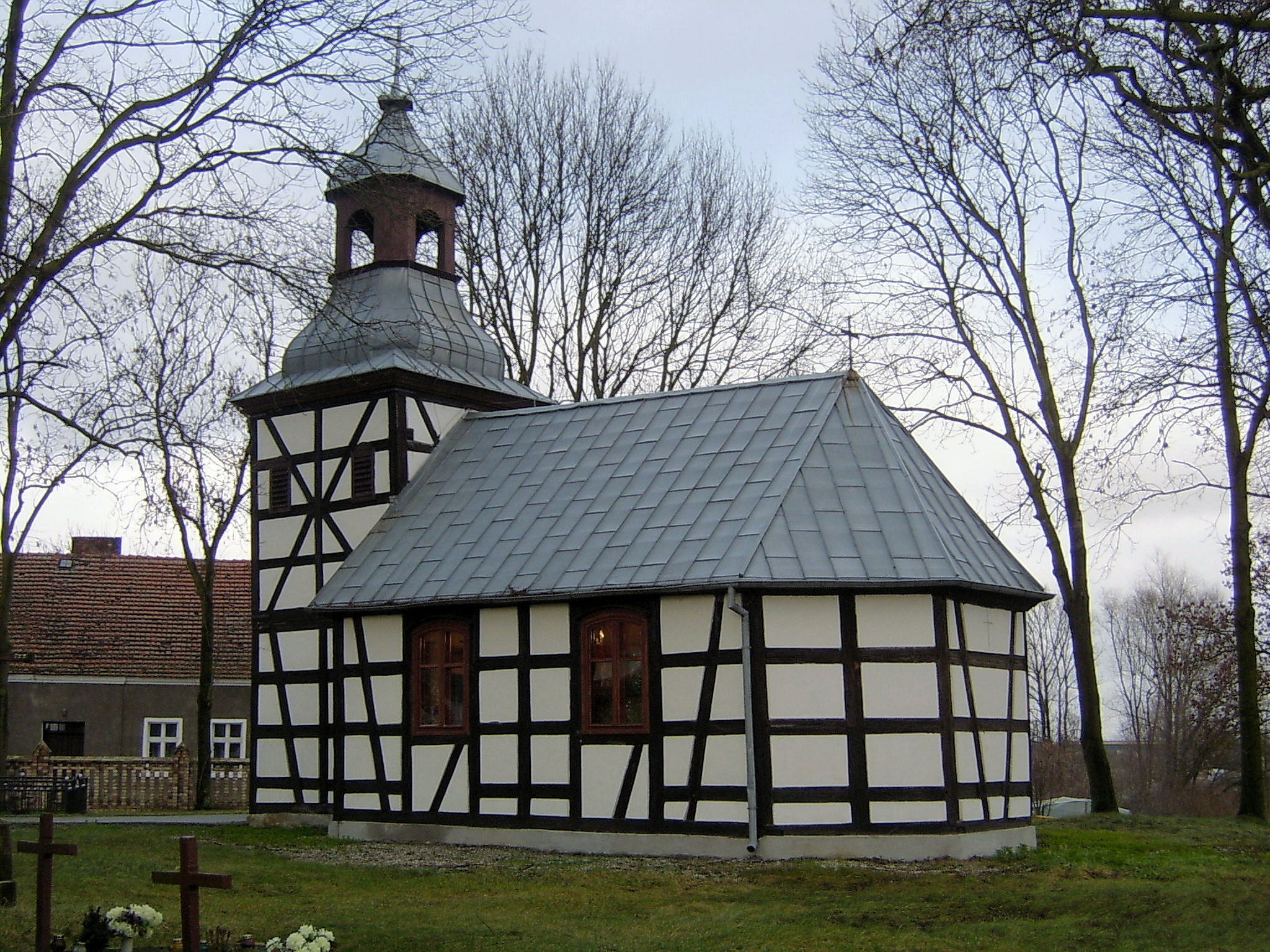
- Church of Saint Adalbert

- Location within Poland
- Coordinates: 52°26′N 15°33′E
- Country: Poland
- Voivodeship: Lubusz
- County: Międzyrzecz
- Gmina: Międzyrzecz

Population
  - Total: 200

Święty Wojciech (Polish: [ˈɕfjɛntɨ ˈvɔjt͡ɕɛx]) is a village in the administrative district of Gmina Międzyrzecz, within Międzyrzecz County, Lubusz Voivodeship, in western Poland.

It was probably the death place of Saint Five Martyred Brothers in the early 11th century.
