= Wyszanowo =

- Village
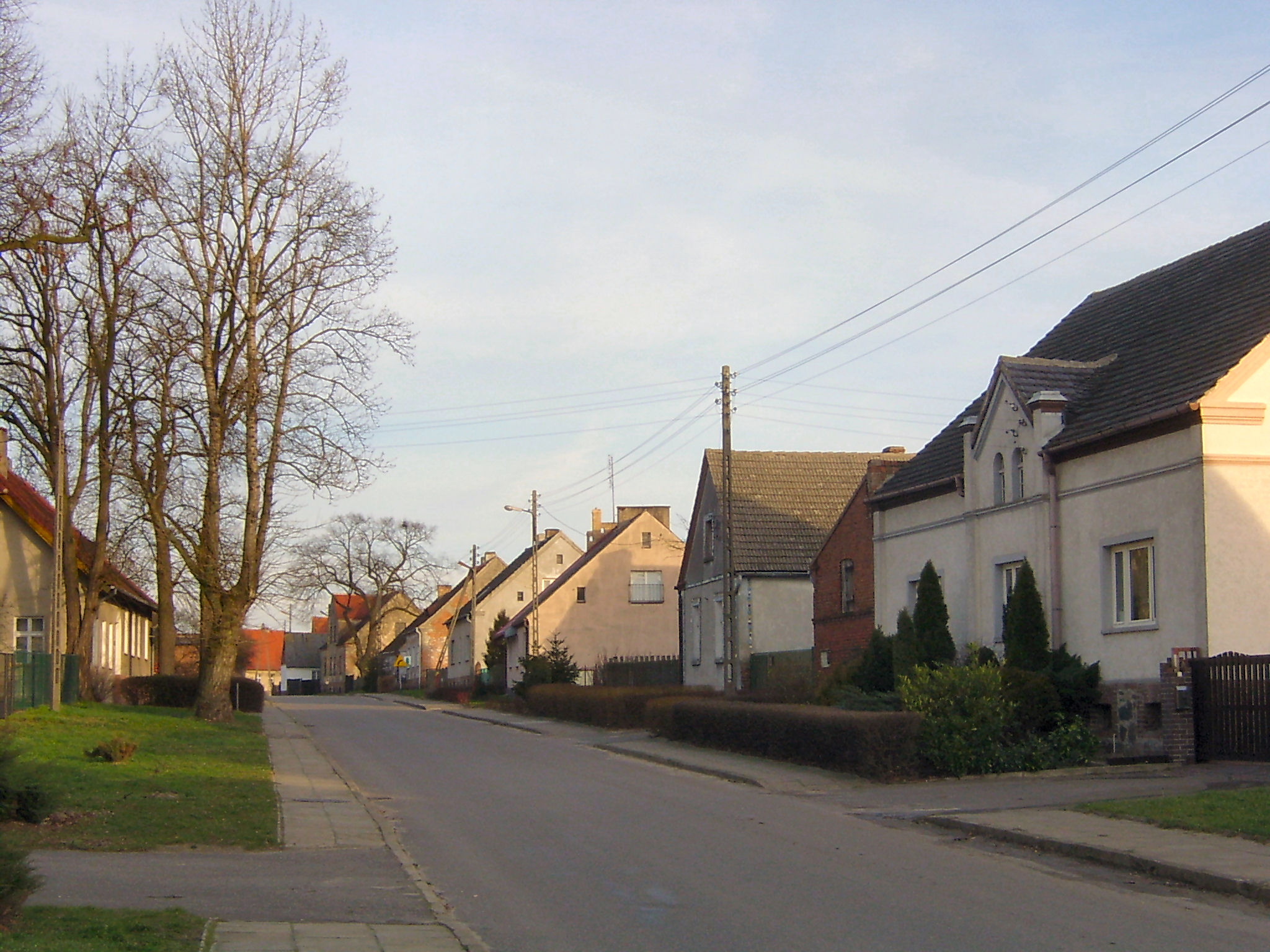

- Location within Poland
- Coordinates: 52°23′N 15°39′E
- Country: Poland
- Voivodeship: Lubusz
- County: Międzyrzecz
- Gmina: Międzyrzecz

Wyszanowo [vɨʂaˈnɔvɔ] (formerly German Wischen) is a village in the administrative district of Gmina Międzyrzecz, within Międzyrzecz County, Lubusz Voivodeship, in western Poland.
