= Łęgowskie =

- Settlement
- Location within Poland
- Coordinates: 52°25′N 15°34′E
- Country: Poland
- Voivodeship: Lubusz
- County: Międzyrzecz
- Gmina: Międzyrzecz
- Population: 16

Łęgowskie [wɛnˈɡɔfskʲɛ] is a settlement in the administrative district of Gmina Międzyrzecz, within Międzyrzecz County, Lubusz Voivodeship, in western Poland.
