= Brzozowy Ług =

- Village
- Location within Poland
- Coordinates: 52°29′17″N 15°34′5″E
- Country: Poland
- Voivodeship: Lubusz
- County: Międzyrzecz
- Gmina: Międzyrzecz
- Population: 30

Brzozowy Ług [bʐɔˈzɔvɨ ˈwuk] is a village in the administrative district of Gmina Międzyrzecz, within Międzyrzecz County, Lubusz Voivodeship, in western Poland.
