= Kolonia Żółwin =

- Village
- Location within Poland
- Coordinates: 52°29′3″N 15°37′4″E
- Country: Poland
- Voivodeship: Lubusz
- County: Międzyrzecz
- Gmina: Międzyrzecz

Kolonia Żółwin [kɔˈlɔɲa ˈʐuu̯vin] is a village in the administrative district of Gmina Międzyrzecz, within Międzyrzecz County, Lubusz Voivodeship, in western Poland.
