= Northern Group of Armed Forces =

Soviet Armed Forces formation

Review of the 6th Soviet Guards Vitebsk-Novgorod Mechanised Division, Northern Group of Forces, in Borne Sulinowo, Poland

The Northern Group of Armed Forces (Russian: Северная группа войск; Polish: Północna grupa wojsk) was the military formation of the Soviet Army (Russian Ground Forces starting 1992) stationed in Poland from the end of Second World War in 1945 until 1993 when they were withdrawn in the aftermath of the fall of the Soviet Union. Although officially considered Polish allies under the Warsaw Pact treaty, they were seen by many Poles as a Soviet occupation force. Jan Parys, the first civilian minister of defense of the Republic of Poland between 1991 and 1992, expressed this.

== History ==
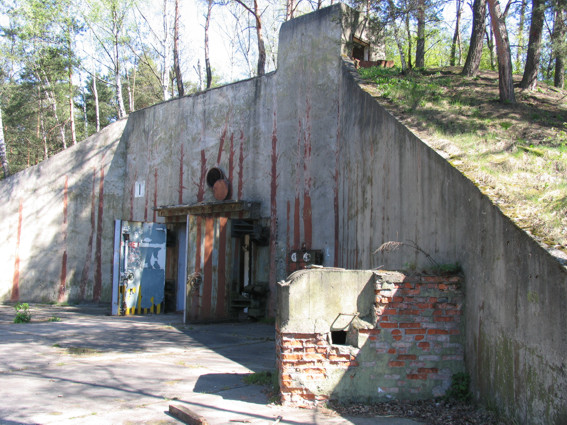
Former Soviet nuclear weapons warehouse Granit 2 near Szprotawa, Poland

=== Early years ===
Soviet forces entered Poland for the first time on 17 September 1939, and then again as they were advancing towards Nazi Germany in the course of the Red Army's Operation Bagration in the summer of 1944. Following the Vistula-Oder Offensive in early 1945, all of Poland was liberated from Nazi occupation by Soviet forces. While formal Polish sovereignty was almost immediately restored, the territory of Poland fell under de facto Soviet control as the Soviet military and security forces acted to ensure that Poland would be ruled by the Soviet-installed communist puppet government of Poland.

As the war ended, the structure of the Soviet military was reorganized from a war-time to a peace-time mode. Directive No. 11097 of 10 June 1945 created several new formations, known as Groups of Forces, equivalent to military districts, but used for command and administration of Soviet forces outside the Soviet Union itself. One of those new formations, at that time 300,000-400,000 strong, was to be stationed in Poland. It was mostly based on the 2nd Belorussian Front of General Konstantin Rokossovsky (formerly stationed around Mecklenburg and Brandenburg). With the exception of Szczecin (Stettin), which fell under the operational territory of the Western Group of Forces, the Northern Group of Forces was located entirely within the territory of Poland.

The Polish communist government, which largely owed its existence to the Soviets (see Polish Committee of National Liberation, 1946 Polish people's referendum, 1947 Polish legislative election), signed several agreements with the Soviet Union regulating the status and purpose of the Soviet troops.

In the early years, the Soviet forces aided the Polish communists in establishing their government and combating anti-communist resistance, such as the Polish cursed soldiers or the Ukrainian Insurgent Army (see Operation Vistula). Another major task of the Northern Group was to organize and transport war reparations from the former eastern territories of Germany attached to Poland after World War II (the so-called Recovered Territories) to the Soviet Union. These actions, often involving the complete stripping down of industrial facilities, sometimes also took place in traditionally Polish territories. This caused tensions between the Soviets and the Polish government, which intended to use the resources of those territories to rebuild Poland.

=== Cold War ===
By 1949 the Soviet Union had concluded twenty-year bilateral treaties of friendship, cooperation, and mutual assistance with Poland and several other countries, which usually granted the Soviet Union rights to a continued military presence on their territory. The Polish government, however, had no operational control over the Soviet forces. On December 17, 1956, as one of the agreements of the Polish October period, the Polish and Soviet governments signed the dedicated treaty that would finally fully regulate the Soviet military presence in Poland, the "Agreement on Legal Status of Soviet Troops Temporarily Stationed in Poland". According to the 1956 treaty (which was further developed by later, more specific amendments), the Soviet military in Poland was limited to 66,000 troops, although the Soviets never fully disclosed the actual number of personnel of the Northern Group to the Polish government, and the Polish government had no right to inspect the Soviet bases. The treaty also limited the number of Soviet bases in Poland to 39, while the actual number of bases reached 79. The Soviets also installed nuclear weapons in Poland, without informing the Polish government of that fact. The treaty's name declared the Soviet military presence to be temporary, while in fact the treaty did not contain any limitations to the duration of their stay, nor any provisions on their withdrawal. Until the 1956 agreement, the Soviet troops stationed in Poland were seen by some Poles as occupying Polish territory; even afterwards they were de facto exempt from any Polish oversight and their role of an 'allied force' stationed in the territory was viewed by many as a mere propaganda claim. The issue of Polish-Soviet military cooperation was further regulated the next year, and in the 1965 Polish-Soviet friendship treaty that reflected the Soviet domination of Polish military policy.

The Northern Group of Forces had several objectives. With the beginning of the Cold War, it was to act, together with other Groups of Forces, as a counterpart to the Western Allies (particularly the United States) forces in Europe. Later, in that regard it represented part of the Warsaw Pact forces, countering the NATO troops. Its second objective was much less stressed in public Soviet sources, but nonetheless crucial: it was to ensure the loyalty of the Polish communist government, and its Polish People's Army; a policy consistent with that of the Brezhnev Doctrine, and enforced during events such as the Hungarian Revolution of 1956 or the Prague Spring of 1968. Soviet forces were mobilized and actually advanced on Warsaw during Polish October in 1956, and there were threats that they could be similarly used before the martial law in Poland was introduced to stem the progress of the Solidarity movement in 1980. All of the objectives of the Northern Group were shared with the Group of Soviet Occupation Forces in Germany in the German Democratic Republic and to a lesser extent with the two Groups with a shorter history: the Central Group of Forces in Czechoslovakia (from 1968 on) and the Southern Group of Forces in Hungary and (only until 1958) Romania.

The presence of Soviet forces on Polish territory caused several problems, in addition to the war reparations issue. Although not supported by the Soviet High Command, excesses by individual soldiers of the Red Army led to mounting tensions between Soviet forces and the Polish population. Contemporary archives contained many reports of mugging, burglary, rape and murder attributed to Soviet soldiers in the immediate aftermath of the Second World War; even Polish Communists were uneasy, as in 1945 the future Chairman of the Polish Council of State, Aleksander Zawadzki, worried that "raping and looting of the Soviet army would provoke a civil war". In the early years, the Red Army appropriated any resources it needed from the Polish government with no thought of compensation, or treating Poles as their allies. For example, when the Northern Group commander, Konstantin Rokossovsky, decided that it should be headquartered in Legnica, he ordered all Poles, including communist officials who were organizing the city and provincial government, to vacate one third of the city within 24 hours, later requisitioning any of their private belongings (like furniture) left behind. This incident was perceived by contemporaries as a particularly brutal action, and rumors circulated exaggerating its severity. Later, Polish settlements in which Soviet garrisons were placed were inconvenienced in other ways, for example by being removed from all official maps or by the low flying Soviet jets, training at night. Approximately 600 Polish citizens died over the years 1945–1993 in crimes or accidents for which the Soviet soldiers were responsible. The Soviet army, which was subject to many financial privileges (reduced taxation, import tariffs, etc.), often refused to pay for municipal resources it consumed, particularly water, gas or electricity. On the other hand, Soviet units did also aid the locals with infrastructure projects, harvests, or during environmental disasters.

After the fall of communism in Poland in 1989, and with the signs of the fall of the Soviet Union, the new Polish government wanted the Soviet troops to leave Poland. By that time the Northern Group had already shrunk to 58,000 troops, but its military installations were still spread over about 700 square kilometres of Polish territory. After a new treaty in late 1991 and May 1992, and Poland's withdrawal from the Warsaw Pact, the Soviet agreed to withdraw military units by 1992 and support units by 1993. Soviet troops had already begun leaving Poland, with the first group exiting in 1991. All troops left Poland by the end of 1993, the last leaving on 18 September. Symbolically, Polish President Lech Wałęsa saw them off on 17 September, the anniversary of the Soviet invasion of Poland in 1939.

== Aftermath ==
The Soviet Army was stationed in Poland for 48 years; it is estimated that its stay cost the Polish state 62.6 billion złoty (in 1993 prices, approx. US$3.5 billion, not counting items removed from Polish territory after World War II); however, the Polish government decided to waive any claims to ensure a quicker evacuation of Soviet troops. The Soviets also claimed that any costs Poland incurred were balanced by the various aid (ex. infrastructure construction) provided over the years by the Soviet troops, as well as by the liberation from the Nazi occupation and later security.

In 1994 the Polish government passed legislation covering the use of the territories formerly used by the Soviet forces. Most of those territories have been put on sale by the Polish government. Some of the Soviet administered areas were subject to ecological contamination and pollution (by oil products, heavy metals, unexploded ordnance). They were also damaged by years of disrepair and poor maintenance.

== Structure ==
=== Post War ===
The Group was headquartered in Legnica, Lower Silesia, where Soviet military took over a third of the city as their extraterritorial enclave (although for six years the operational headquarters was in Świdnica). Other major Soviet military bases were located in Bagicz, Białogard, Brzeg, Borne Sulinowo (one of the two largest), Burzykowo, Chojna, Dębice, Kęszyca Leśna, Kluczewo, Kłomino, Nowa Sól, Oława, Przemków-Trzebień (may refer to the same base as Strachów/Pstrąże), Strachów (now - deserted town shown as Pstrąże on maps), Świdnica, Świętoszów, Świnoujście (military harbor), Szprotawa, Wschowa, Żagań. Those bases included 15 airfields, 1 large and 11 smaller ports,

In the late 1940s the NGF included:

- 43rd Army was stationed in the region Gdańsk - Świnoujście - Szczecinek; one of its corps was stationed on the Danish island of Bornholm. However, it was disbanded in the summer of 1946.
- 65th Army was stationed in the region Łódź - Poznań - Wrocław. It initially included 108th Rifle Division. 7th Red Banner Tank Army was created in 1946 from HQ, 65th Army and in 1947 was transferred to the Belorussian Military District. After the creation of 7th Tank Army, 18th Rifle Corps was transferred to the control of the Northern Group of Forces, where it remained from 12 June 1946 until it was disbanded in July 1952.
- 52nd Army was stationed in the region Kielce - Częstochowa - Kraków.
- 96th Rifle Corps was stationed in the region Łomża - Mława - Pułtusk.
- 3rd Guards Cavalry Corps was stationed in Lublin.
- 3rd Guards Tank Corps was stationed in Kraków.
- 5th Tank Corps was stationed in Białystok.
- 10th Tank Corps was stationed in Krotoszyn.
- 20th Tank Corps was stationed in Wrocław. This formation became the 20th Tank Division later in 1945.
- Elements of the Soviet 4th Air Army were also stationed in Poland: 8th Fighter Corps, Soviet 4th Air Assault Corps and Soviet 5th Bomber Corps.

Altogether the Northern Group of Forces had three ground and one air army, four tank corps (from July 1945 reorganized into tank divisions), 30 rifle divisions, 12 air divisions, one cavalry corps and 10 artillery divisions. The formation had a strength of around 300,000-400,000 soldiers stationed in Poland.

This large number of formations was quickly reduced as the post war demobilisation took place.

=== Mid 1950s ===
By 1955 the force had been reduced to the 18th, 26th, and 27th Rifle Divisions, the 20th Tank Division, and the 26th Mechanised Division – probably numbering no more than 100,000 troops.

=== 1980s and Early 1990s ===
Northern Group of Forces locations 1989

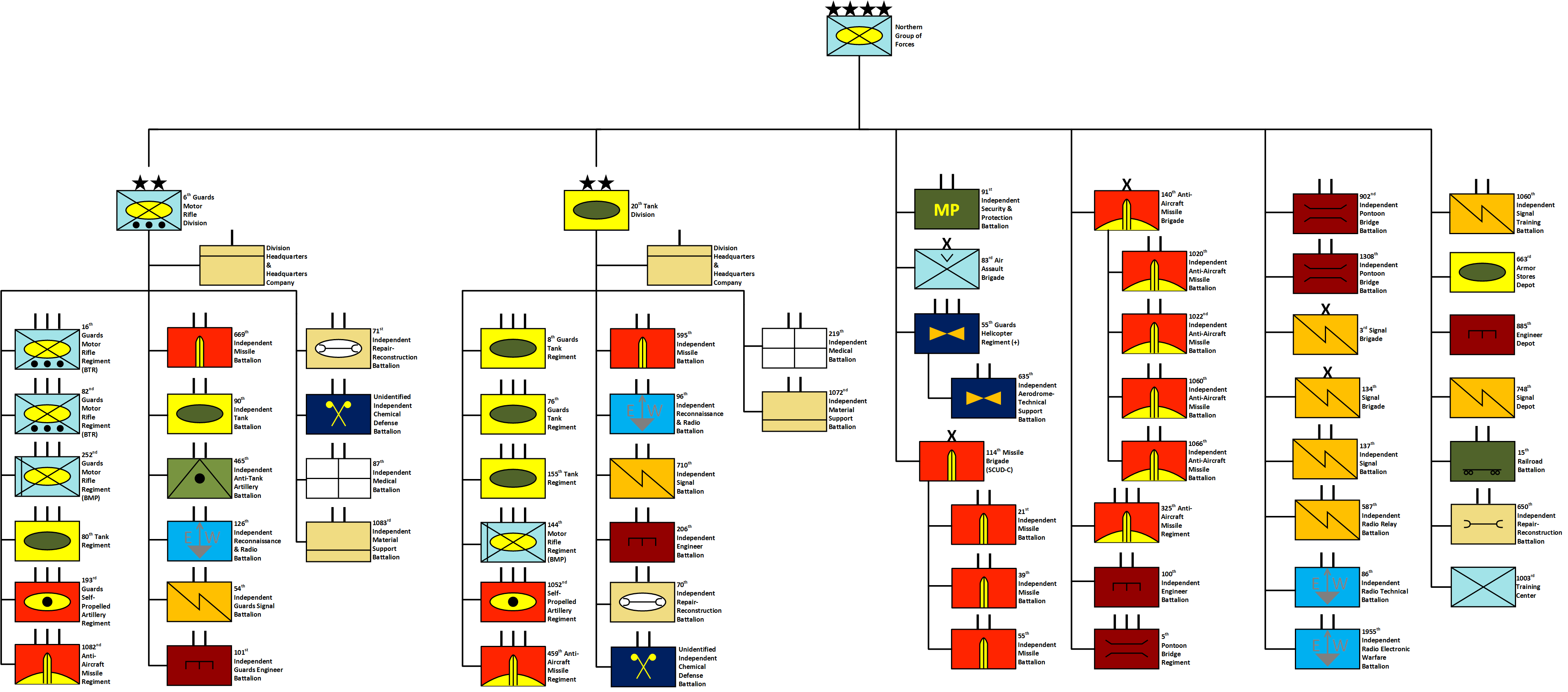
Northern Group of Forces as of 1988

The 83rd Separate Air Assault Brigade was formed at Białogard in 1986.

The 6th Guards Motor Rifle Division (1982-) and 20th Tank Division were the principal Soviet formations stationed in the Group in the 1980s and early 1990s. Air support was provided by the 4th Air Army.

- Northern Group of Forces, in Legnica
  - 6th Guards Motor Rifle Division, in Borne Sulinowo
  - 20th Tank Division, in Świętoszów
  - 83rd Separate Air Assault Brigade, in Białogard
  - 114th Operational-Tactical Missile Brigade, in Legnica
  - 140th Anti-Aircraft Missile Brigade, in Trzebień
  - 4th Air Army, in Legnica
    - 132nd Bomber Aviation Division, in Chernyakhovsk
    - 149th Bomber Aviation Division, in Szprotawa
    - 239th Fighter Aviation Division, in Klezewo near Stargard

In the 1990s, when the Group was preparing to leave Poland, it had the strength of approximately 56,000 soldiers, with 600 tanks, 400 artillery pieces and 200 planes.

The Northern Group had its own newspaper, the Znamia Pobiedy (Flag of Victory).

The Northern Group had nuclear weapons deployed in at least three bases in Poland with some 178 nuclear assets, growing to 250 in the late 1980s.

== Personnel ==
=== Soviet ===
Commanders of Northern Group of Forces

- June 1945 – October 1949: Marshal of the Soviet Union Konstantin Rokossovsky
- October 1949 – August 1950: colonel general Kuzma Trubnikov
- September 1950 – July 1952: lieutenant general Alexei Radziyevsky
- July 1952 – June 1955: lieutenant general Mikhail Konstantinov
- June 1955 – February 1958: army general Kuzma Galitsky
- February 1958 – March 1963: colonel general Georgy Khetagurov
- March 1963 – June 1964: colonel general Sergei Maryakhin
- June 1964 – October 1964: lieutenant general Alexander Rudakov
- October 1964 – June 1967: colonel general Gleb Baklanov
- June 1967 – November 1968: army general Ivan Shkadov
- December 1968 – May 1973: colonel general Magomed Tankayev
- June 1973 – July 1975: colonel general Ivan Gerasimov
- July 1975 – January 1978: colonel general Oleg Kulishev
- February 1978 – August 1984: colonel general Yuri Zarudin
- August 1984 – February 1987: colonel general Alexander Kovtunov
- February 1987 – June 1989: colonel general Ivan Korbutov
- July 1989 – June 1992: colonel general Viktor Dubynin
- June 1992 – September 1993: colonel general Leonid Kovalyov

=== Polish ===
Representative of Polish Council of Ministers

- June 1945 – 1946: colonel Antoni Alster

Delegates of Economical Committee of Council of Ministers

- December 1946 – July 1947: colonel Julian Tokarski
- July 1947 – May 1949: colonel Wojciech Wilkoński
- May 1949 – 1952: colonel Teodor Kusznierek
- 1952 – 1957: colonel Jan Kogut

Representatives of the Polish People's Army in the matter of stay of Soviet forces in Poland

- April 1957 – April 1968: brigadier general Leszek Krzemień (also known as Maks Wolf)
- April 1968 – November 1972: major general Czesław Jan Czubryt-Borkowski
- November 1972 – March 1977: major general Józef Stebelski
- April 1977 – 1986: major general Michał Stryga
- 1986 – December 1988: major general Zbigniew Ohanowicz
- January 1989 – October 1990: brigadier general Mieczysław Dębicki
- October 1990 – February 1995: brigadier general Zdzisław Ostrowski

== See also ==
- Central Group of Forces
- Southern Group of Forces
- Western Group of Forces
