= Wysoka, Międzyrzecz County =

Wysoka
- Village
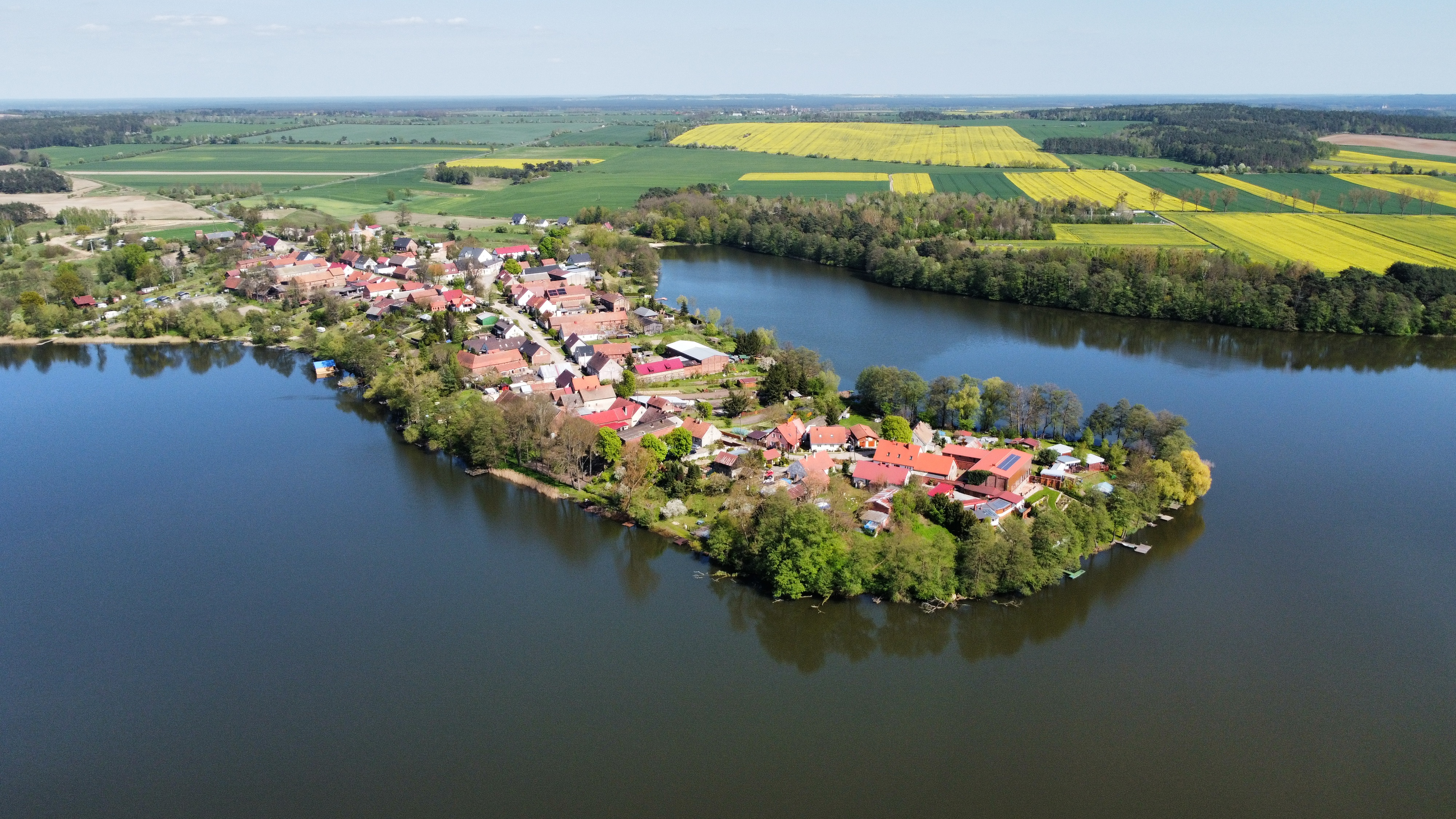
- Aerial view of Wysoka

- Location within Poland
- Coordinates: 52°22′N 15°27′E
- Country: Poland
- Voivodeship: Lubusz
- County: Międzyrzecz
- Gmina: Międzyrzecz
- Time zone: UTC+1 (CET)
  - Summer (DST): UTC+2 (CEST)
- Vehicle registration: FMI

Wysoka [vɨˈsɔka] is a village in the administrative district of Gmina Międzyrzecz, within Międzyrzecz County, Lubusz Voivodeship, in western Poland. It is situated on the shore of Paklicko Małe Lake.

Wysoka was a private church village, administratively located in the Poznań County in the Poznań Voivodeship in the Greater Poland Province of the Kingdom of Poland.
