= Zamostowo =

- Village
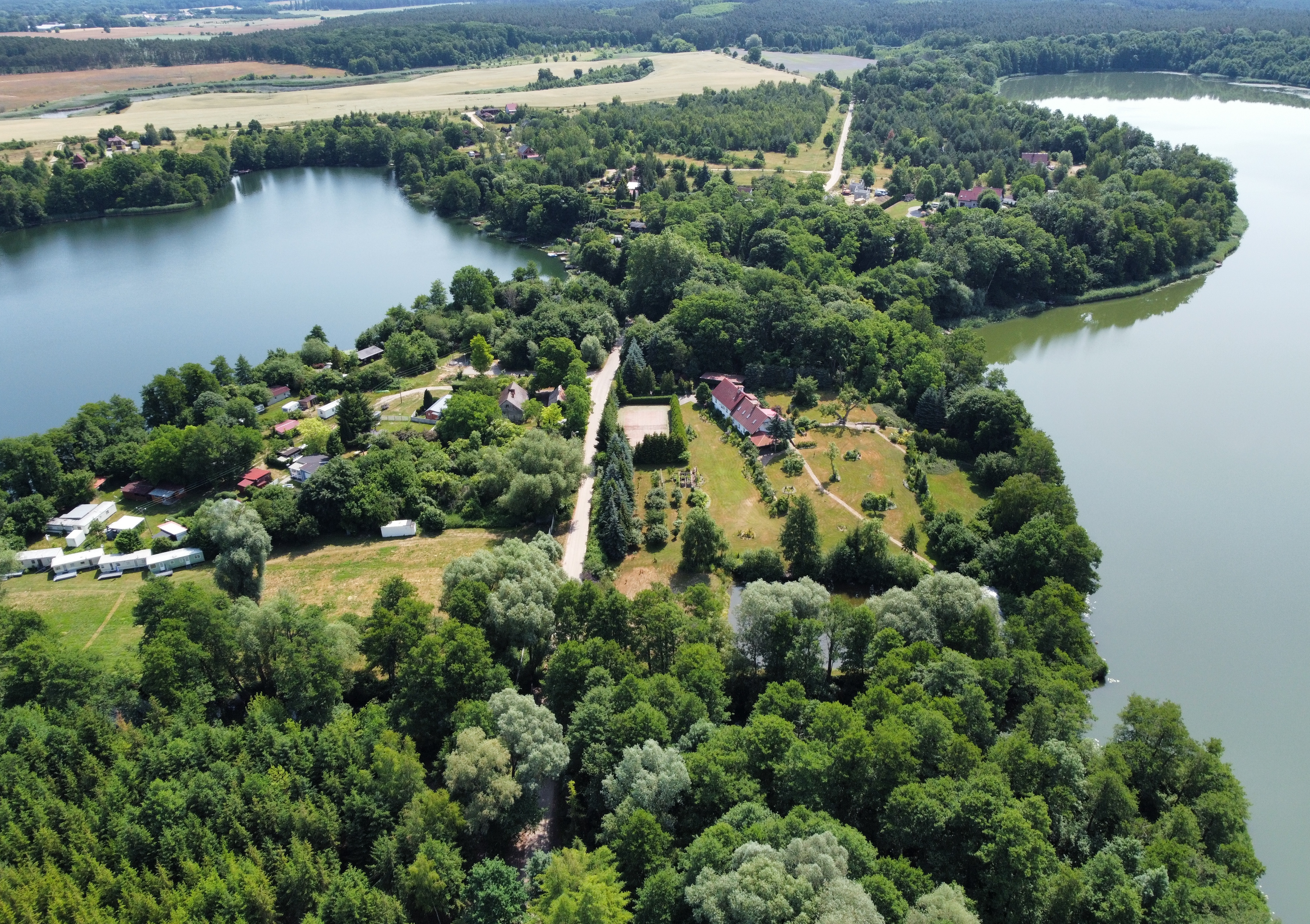
- Aerial view of Zamostowo

- Location within Poland
- Coordinates: 52°27′30″N 15°27′16″E
- Country: Poland
- Voivodeship: Lubusz
- County: Międzyrzecz
- Gmina: Międzyrzecz
- Time zone: UTC+1 (CET)
  - Summer (DST): UTC+2 (CEST)
- Postal code: 66-300
- Vehicle registration: FMI

Zamostowo [zamɔsˈtɔvɔ] is a village in the administrative district of Gmina Międzyrzecz, within Międzyrzecz County, Lubusz Voivodeship, in western Poland.

Zamostowo was a private village, administratively located in the Poznań County in the Poznań Voivodeship in the Greater Poland Province of the Kingdom of Poland.
