= Międzyrzecz-Wybudowanie =

- Village
- Location within Poland
- Coordinates: 52°26′28″N 15°33′10″E
- Country: Poland
- Voivodeship: Lubusz
- County: Międzyrzecz
- Gmina: Międzyrzecz
- Elevation: 51 m (167 ft)
- Population: 79 (2,008)

Międzyrzecz-Wybudowanie [mjɛnˈd͡zɨʐɛt͡ʂ vɨbudɔˈvaɲɛ] is a village in the administrative district of Gmina Międzyrzecz, within Międzyrzecz County, Lubusz Voivodeship, in western Poland.
