= Kęszyca Leśna =

- Village
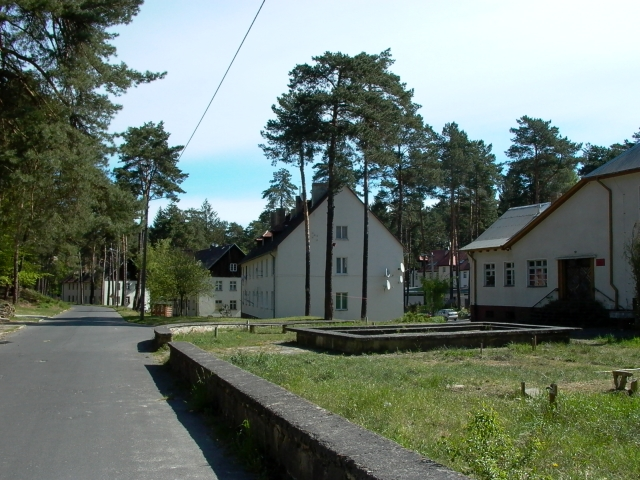

- Location within Poland
- Coordinates: 52°24′N 15°28′E
- Country: Poland
- Voivodeship: Lubusz
- County: Międzyrzecz
- Gmina: Międzyrzecz
- Elevation: 75 m (246 ft)
- Population (March 2011): 638

Kęszyca Leśna [kɛ̃ˈʂɨt͡sa ˈlɛɕna] is a village in the administrative district of Gmina Międzyrzecz, within Międzyrzecz County, Lubusz Voivodeship, in western Poland. It was a location of the Soviet military garrison, which left in 1993, and since 1994 it is an independent populated place.

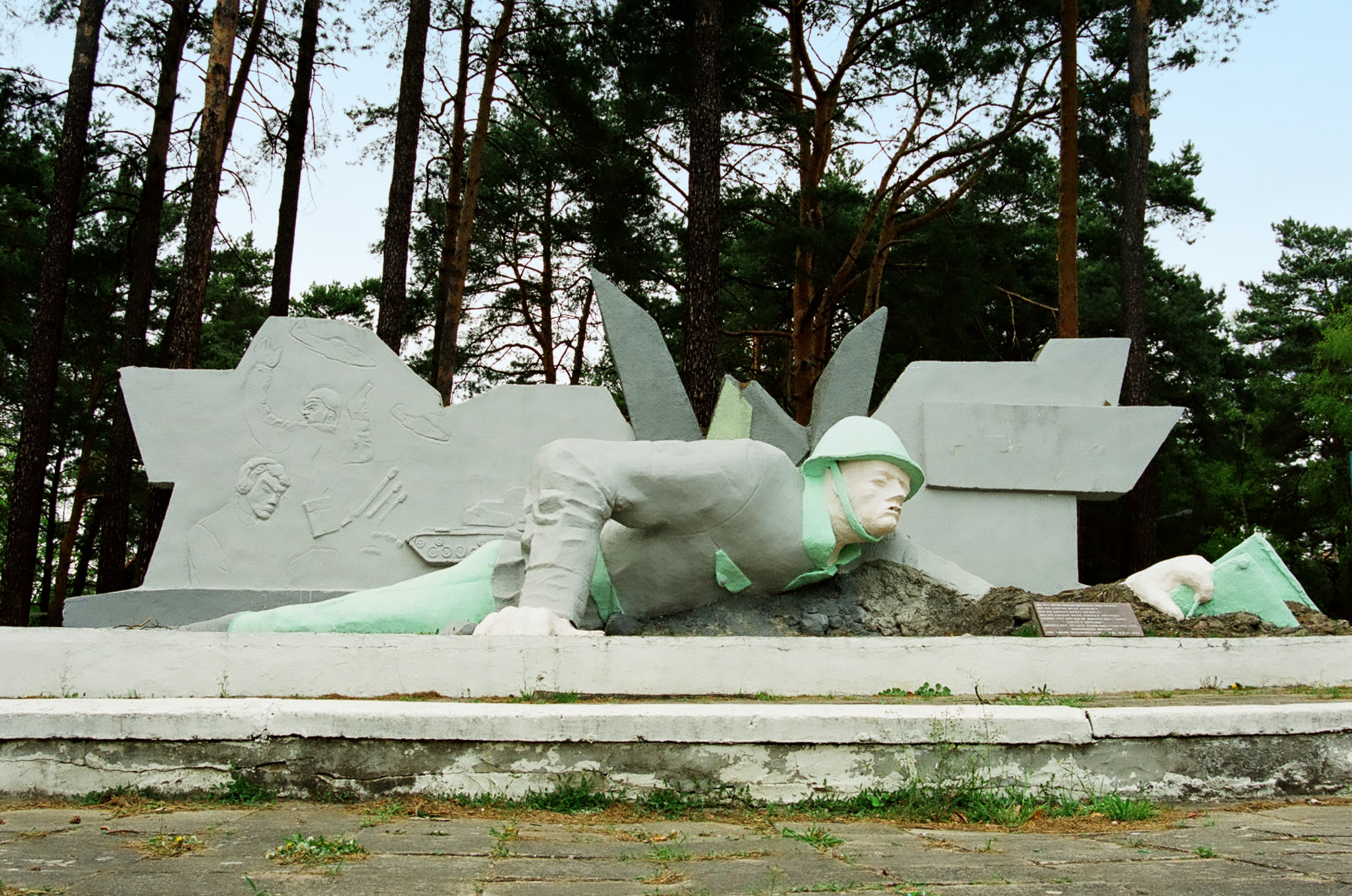
A soviet monument to a communications soldier

== See also ==
- Regenwurmlager
