= Pieski, Lubusz Voivodeship =

Pieski
- Village
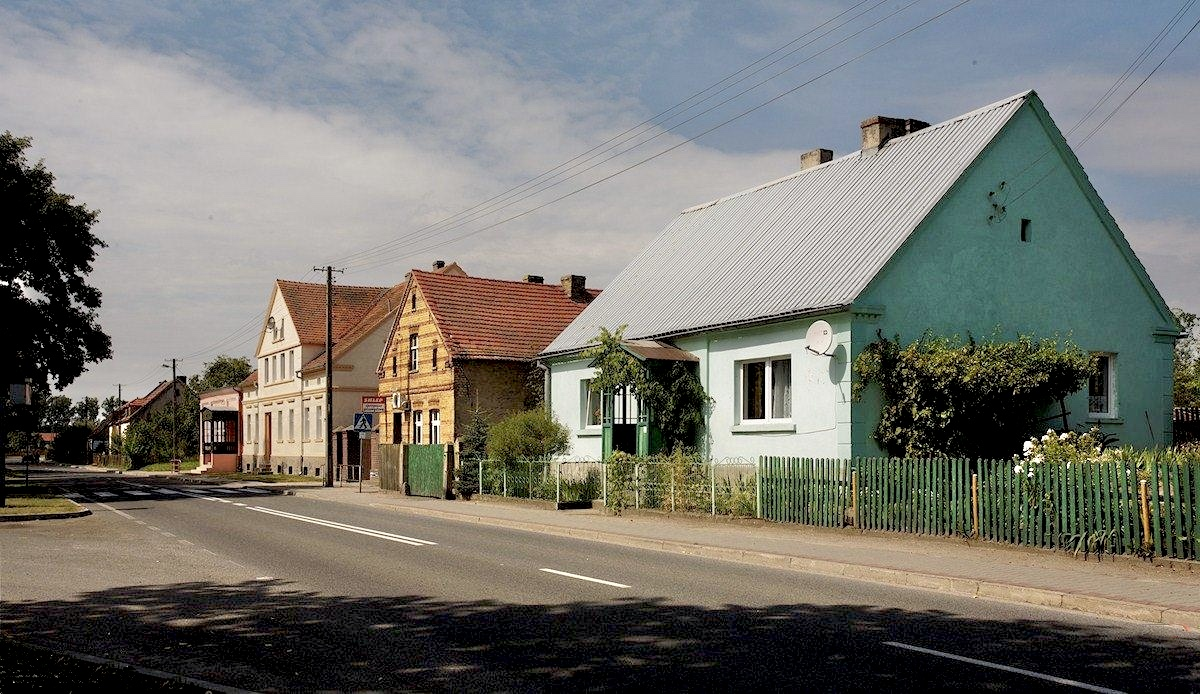

- Location within Poland
- Coordinates: 52°25′N 15°26′E
- Country: Poland
- Voivodeship: Lubusz
- County: Międzyrzecz
- Gmina: Międzyrzecz

Population (2008)
  - Total: 245
- Time zone: UTC+1 (CET)
  - Summer (DST): UTC+2 (CEST)
- Postal code: 66-306
- Vehicle registration: FMI

Pieski [ˈpjɛski] is a village in the administrative district of Gmina Międzyrzecz, within Międzyrzecz County, Lubusz Voivodeship, in western Poland.

Pieski was a private village, administratively located in the Poznań County in the Poznań Voivodeship in the Greater Poland Province of the Kingdom of Poland.

A bunker was built near the village, on the road toward Międzyrzecz, before World War II in 1935.

== Sports ==
- KS As Pieski – men's and women's football club (Polish league, level 7)
