= Marianowo, Lubusz Voivodeship =

Marianowo
- Settlement
- Location within Poland
- Coordinates: 52°28′28″N 15°40′28″E
- Country: Poland
- Voivodeship: Lubusz
- County: Międzyrzecz
- Gmina: Międzyrzecz

Marianowo [marjaˈnɔvɔ] is a settlement in the administrative district of Gmina Międzyrzecz, within Międzyrzecz County, Lubusz Voivodeship, in western Poland.
