= Głębokie, Międzyrzecz County =

Głębokie
- Village
- Location within Poland
- Coordinates: 52°29′18″N 15°32′35″E
- Country: Poland
- Voivodeship: Lubusz
- County: Międzyrzecz
- Gmina: Międzyrzecz
- Population: 8

Głębokie ([ɡwɛmˈbɔkʲɛ]; German: Glembuch) is a village in the administrative district of Gmina Międzyrzecz, within Międzyrzecz County, Lubusz Voivodeship, in western Poland.
