= Gorzyca, Lubusz Voivodeship =

Gorzyca
- Village
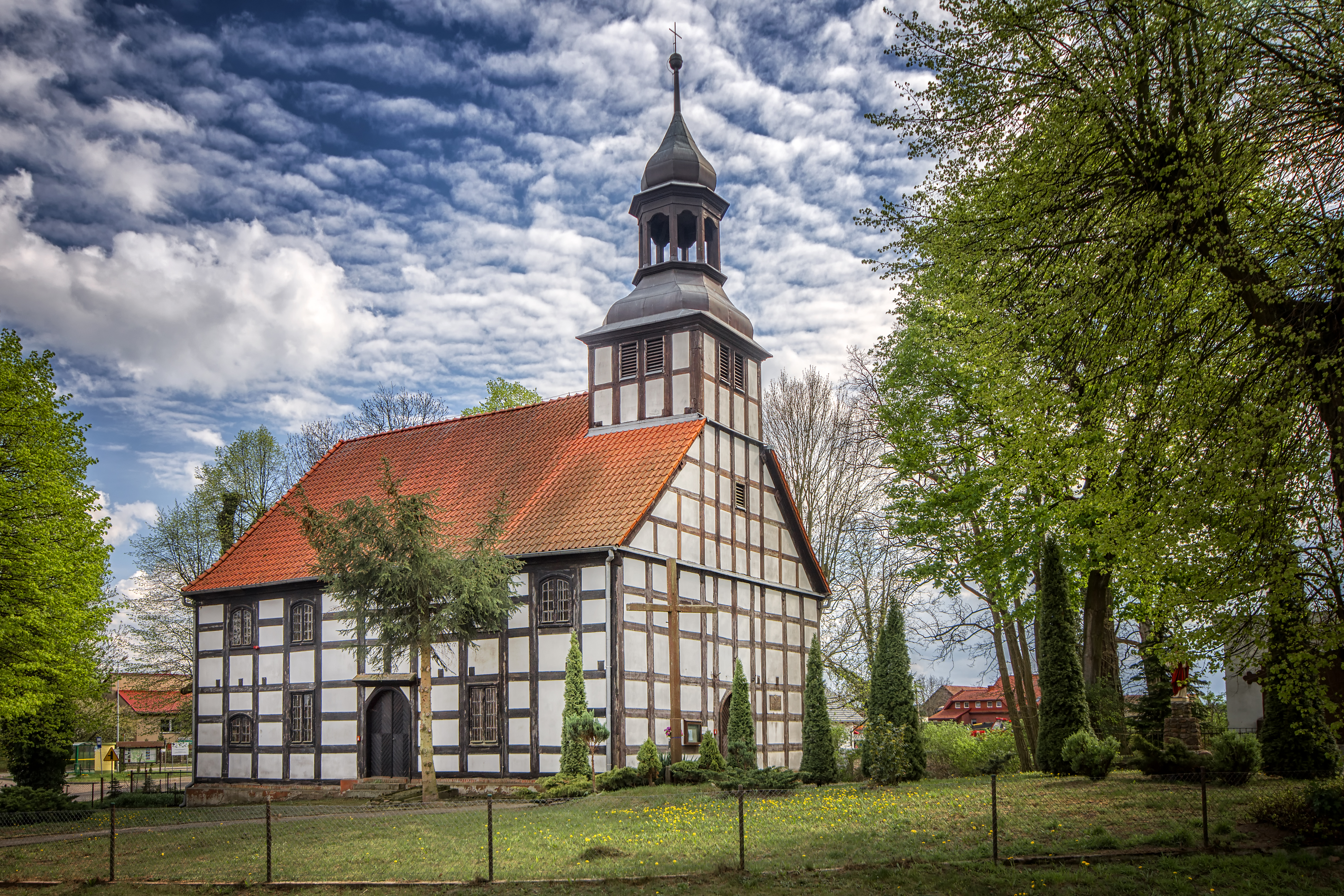
- Sacred Heart church in Gorzyca

- Location within Poland
- Coordinates: 52°27′N 15°29′E
- Country: Poland
- Voivodeship: Lubusz
- County: Międzyrzecz
- Gmina: Międzyrzecz

Population
  - Total: 320
- Time zone: UTC+1 (CET)
  - Summer (DST): UTC+2 (CEST)
- Postal code: 66-300
- Vehicle registration: FMI

Gorzyca [ɡɔˈʐɨt͡sa] is a village in the administrative district of Gmina Międzyrzecz, within Międzyrzecz County, Lubusz Voivodeship, in western Poland.

Gorzyca was a private village, administratively located in the Poznań County in the Poznań Voivodeship in the Greater Poland Province of the Kingdom of Poland.
