= Jagielnik =

Jagielnik may refer to the following places in Poland:

- Jagielnik, Lubusz Voivodeship
- Jagielnik, West Pomeranian Voivodeship
