= Kalawa =

Kalawa may refer to:

- Kalawa people, an ethnic group of Australia
- Calau, known in Lower Sorbian as Kalawa, a town in Germany
- Kalawa, a subdivision of Makueni County, Kenya
- Kaława, a village in Poland

== See also ==
- Kalawa Jazmee Records, a South African record label
