= Jagielnik, Lubusz Voivodeship =

Jagielnik
- Village
- Location within Poland
- Coordinates: 52°26′N 15°32′E
- Country: Poland
- Voivodeship: Lubusz
- County: Międzyrzecz
- Gmina: Międzyrzecz

Jagielnik (Polish pronunciation: [jaˈɡʲɛlɲik]) is a village in the administrative district of Gmina Międzyrzecz, within Międzyrzecz County, Lubusz Voivodeship, in western Poland.
