= Bukowiec, Lubusz Voivodeship =

Bukowiec
- Village
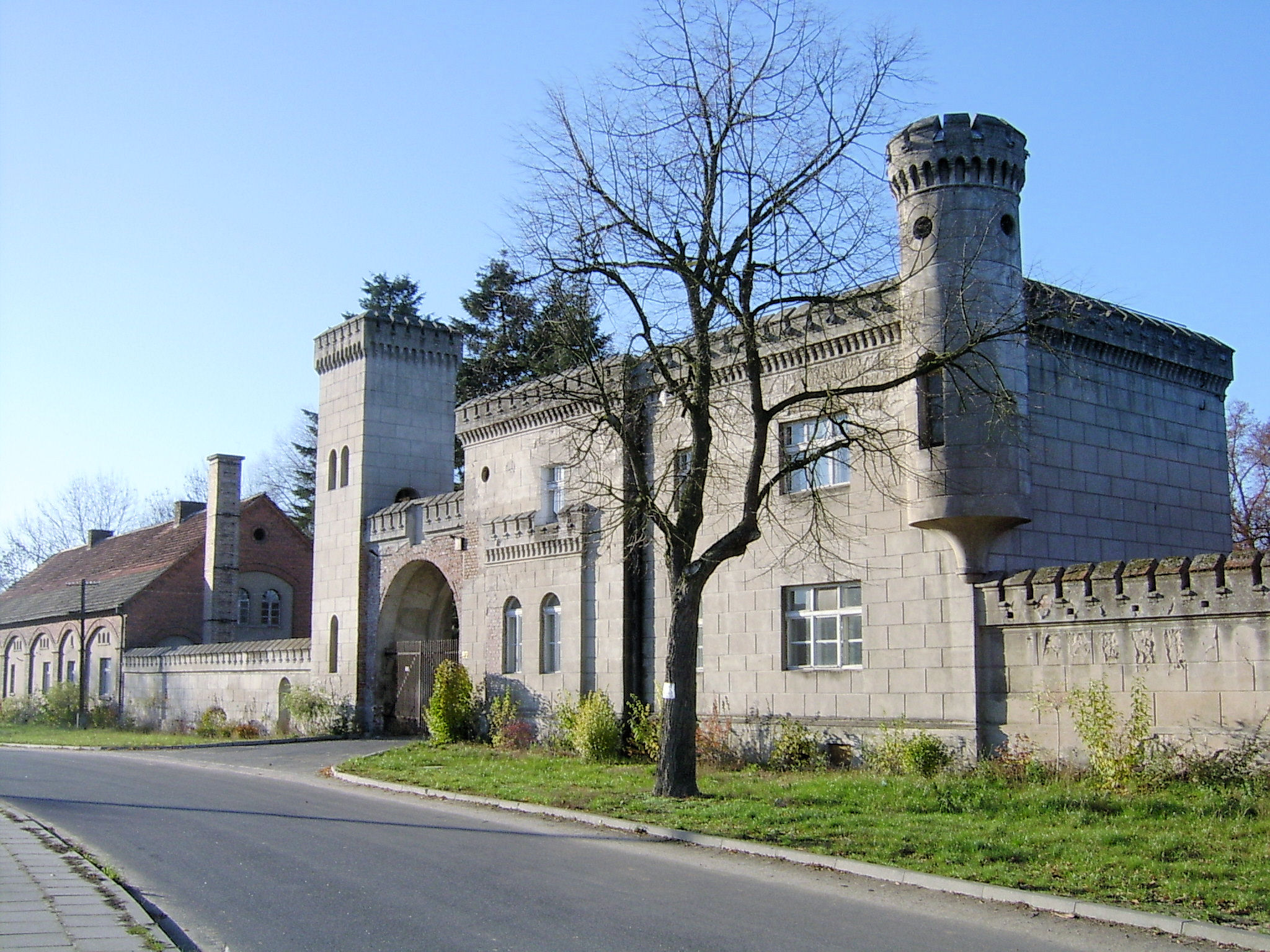

- Location within Poland
- Coordinates: 52°32′54″N 15°41′19″E
- Country: Poland
- Voivodeship: Lubusz
- County: Międzyrzecz
- Gmina: Międzyrzecz
- Elevation: 100 m (330 ft)
- Population: 835 (2,008)

Bukowiec [buˈkɔvjɛt͡s] (formerly German Bauchwitz) is a village in the administrative district of Gmina Międzyrzecz, within Międzyrzecz County, Lubusz Voivodeship, in western Poland.

== Sports ==
- KS Błękitni Bukowiec – men's football club (Polish league level 8)
