= Pniewo, Gmina Międzyrzecz =

Pniewo
- Settlement
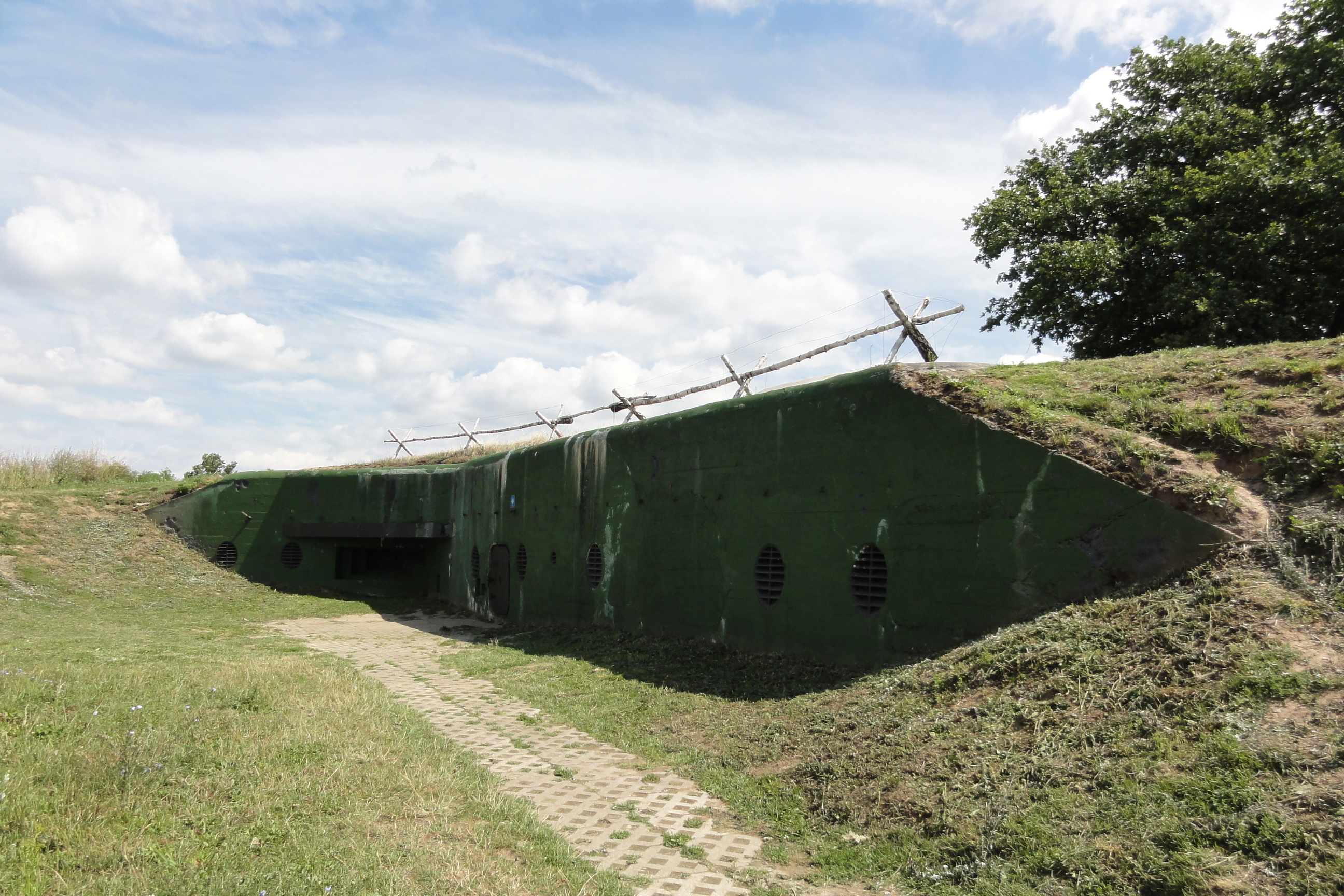

- Location within Poland
- Coordinates: 52°22′17″N 15°30′21″E
- Country: Poland
- Voivodeship: Lubusz
- County: Międzyrzecz
- Gmina: Międzyrzecz

Pniewo [ˈpɲɛvɔ] is a settlement in the administrative district of Gmina Międzyrzecz, within Międzyrzecz County, Lubusz Voivodeship, in western Poland.
