= Trzciel =

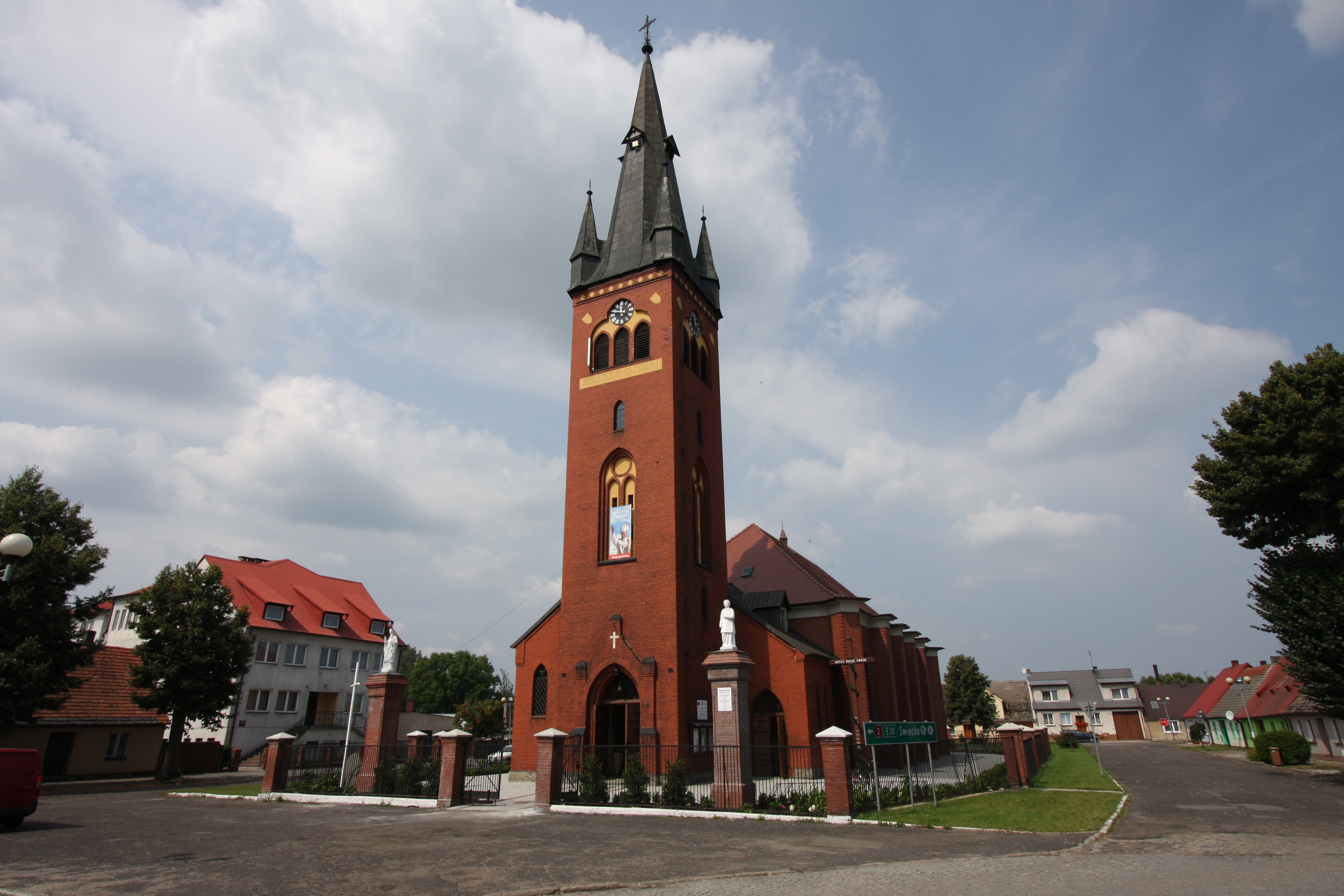
- Parish church

- Coat of arms

- Location within Poland
- Coordinates: 52°22′N 15°53′E
- Country: Poland
- Voivodeship: Lubusz
- County: Międzyrzecz
- Gmina: Trzciel

Area
  - Total: 3.03 km^{2} (1.17 sq mi)

Population (2019-06-30)
  - Total: 2,391
  - Density: 789/km^{2} (2,040/sq mi)
- Time zone: UTC+1 (CET)
  - Summer (DST): UTC+2 (CEST)
- Postal code: 66-320
- Vehicle registration: FMI
- Website: http://www.trzciel.pl

Trzciel [tʂt͡ɕɛl] (German: Tirschtiegel) is a town in Lubusz Voivodeship, Poland, with 2,391 inhabitants (2019).

== History ==
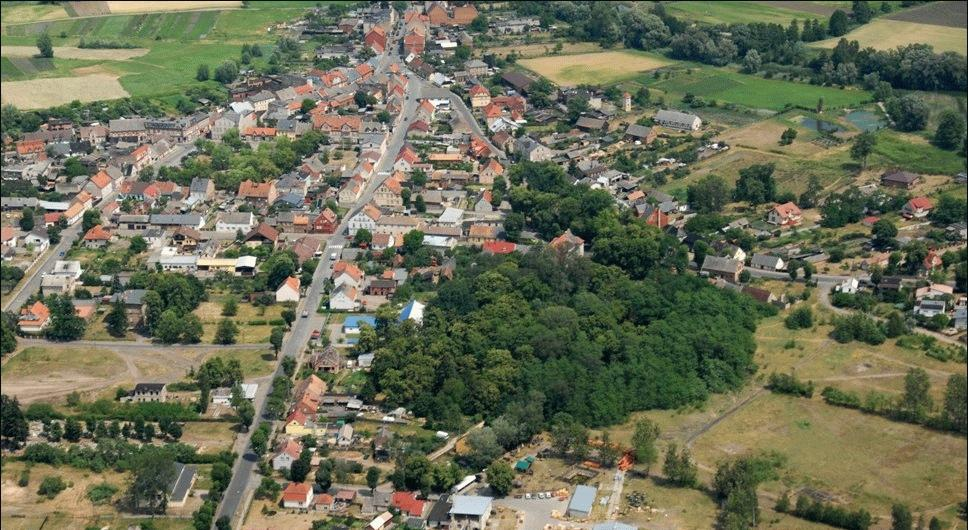
Aerial view of Trzciel

The name Trzciel comes from the old Slavic word "trzcielina", which meant a cane stalk. Trzciel is a former Slavic stronghold, which became part of the emerging Polish state in the 10th century under its first historic ruler Mieszko I of Poland. Since the Late Middle Ages it was located in the Poznań Voivodeship within the larger Greater Poland Province. Trzciel enjoyed partial town rights in the 14th century and was granted full town rights by King Casimir IV Jagiellon in 1458. It was a private town of Poland, owned by various noble families, including the Opaliński, Mielżyński and Szołdrski families. From the 15th century clothmaking developed.

During the Thirty Years' War refugees from Silesia and Brandenburg settled in the town and founded the New Town (Nowe Miasto) district. During the Swedish invasion of Poland (the "Deluge"), in 1655, Trzciel was captured and occupied by the Swedes. As a result of the Second Partition of Poland Trzciel was annexed by Prussia in 1793. In 1806 French Emperor Napoleon stopped in the town. After the successful Greater Poland uprising of 1806, it was regained by Poles and included within the short-lived Duchy of Warsaw, and then it fell to Prussia again in 1815. In 1820 the first German mayor took office. Trzciel was subject to heavy Germanisation policies. In 1871 along with Prussia it became part of Germany.

Local Poles took part in the Greater Poland uprising (1918–19), aiming at reuniting the town with Poland after regaining independence in 1918. Despite being part of historic Greater Poland, the cradle of the Polish state, due to being almost exclusively inhabited by German-speakers only the part of Trzciel east of the rail-line, including the train station, was assigned to Poland. The town remained thus divided between Germany and Poland until the German invasion of Poland in 1939. During World War II the Germans established a forced labour camp for Jews in the town. In January 1945 the town was captured by the Soviets, and after the defeat of Nazi Germany it was finally reintegrated with Poland. Zygmunt Wałęza was appointed the first Polish mayor of Trzciel after 125 years.

== Notable people ==
- Gerhard Konopka (1911–1997), Wehrmacht officer

== Twin towns – sister cities ==
See twin towns of Gmina Trzciel.
