= Gmina Międzyrzecz =

Gmina Międzyrzecz Międzyrzecz Commune
- Gmina
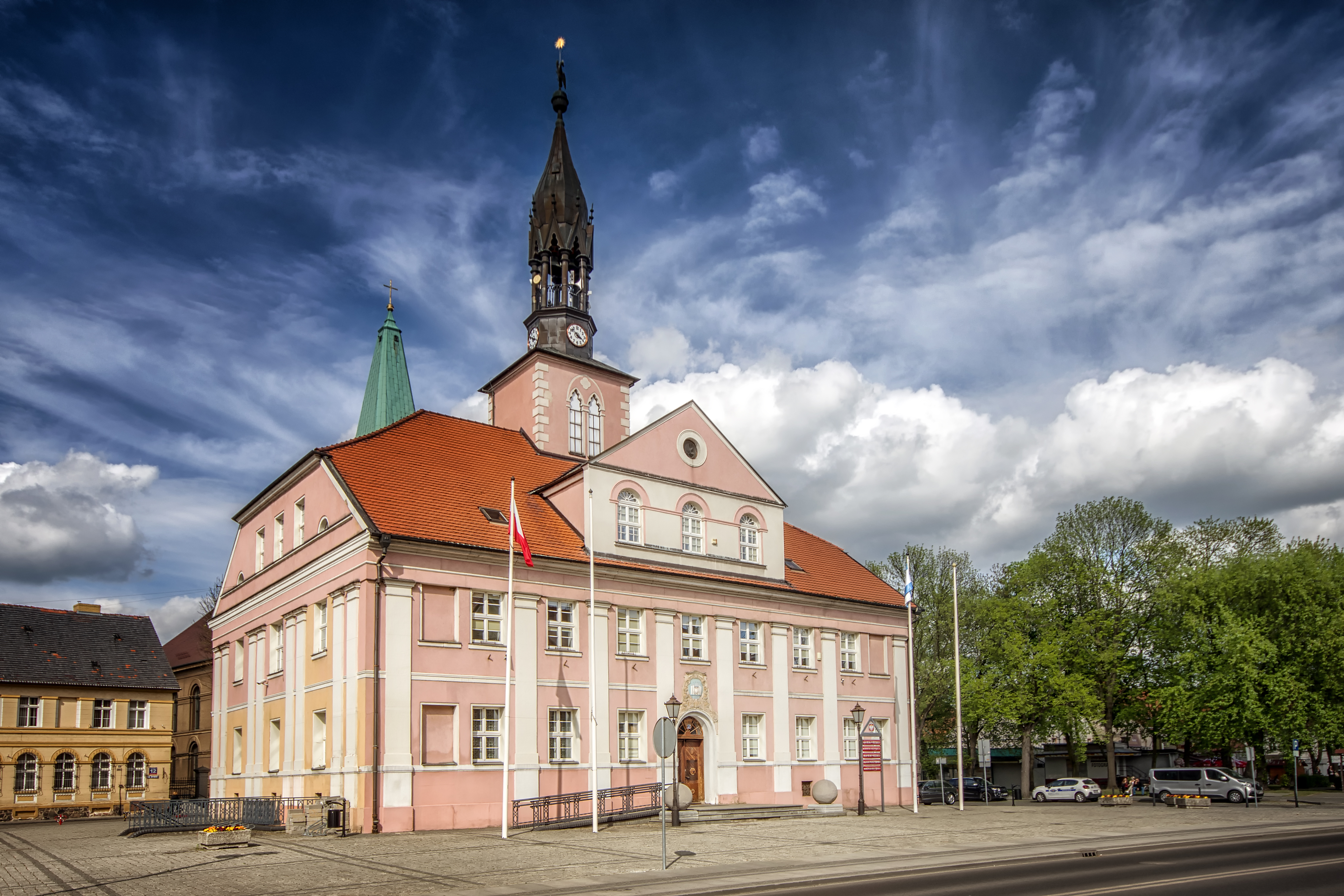
- Town Hall in Międzyrzecz, seat of the gmina office

- Flag Coat of arms
- Interactive map of Gmina Międzyrzecz
- Coordinates (Międzyrzecz): 52°26′54″N 15°35′18″E
- Country: Poland
- Voivodeship: Lubusz
- County: Międzyrzecz
- Seat: Międzyrzecz

Area
  - Total: 315.32 km^{2} (121.75 sq mi)

Population (2019-06-30)
  - Total: 24,942
  - Density: 79.101/km^{2} (204.87/sq mi)
  - Urban: 17,994
  - Rural: 6,948
- Time zone: UTC+1 (CET)
  - Summer (DST): UTC+2 (CEST)
- Vehicle registration: FMI
- Website: https://www.miedzyrzecz.pl/

Gmina Międzyrzecz is an urban-rural gmina (administrative district) in Międzyrzecz County, Lubusz Voivodeship, in western Poland. Its seat is the town of Międzyrzecz, which lies approximately 48 kilometres (30 mi) southeast of Gorzów Wielkopolski and 68 km (42 mi) north of Zielona Góra.

The gmina covers an area of 315.32 square kilometres (121.7 sq mi), and as of 2019 its total population is 24,942.

== Neighbouring gminas ==
Gmina Międzyrzecz is bordered by the gminas of Bledzew, Lubrza, Przytoczna, Pszczew, Sulęcin, Świebodzin and Trzciel.

== Villages ==
Apart from the town of Międzyrzecz, the gmina contains the villages of Bobowicko, Brzozowy Ług, Bukowiec, Głębokie, Gorzyca, Jagielnik, Jeleniogłowy, Kaława, Kalsko, Karolewo, Kęszyca, Kęszyca Leśna, Kęszyca-Kolonia, Kolonia Nietoperek, Kolonia Żółwin, Kuligowo, Kursko, Kuźnik, Kwiecie, Łęgowskie, Lubosinek, Marianowo, Międzyrzecz-Wybudowanie, Nietoperek, Pieski, Pniewo, Rojewo, Skoki, Święty Wojciech, Szumiąca, Wojciechówek, Wysoka, Wyszanowo, Zamostowo and Żółwin.

== Twin towns – sister cities ==
Gmina Międzyrzecz is twinned with:

- Andrésy, France (2005)
- Bad Freienwalde, Germany (2001)
- Charlottenburg-Wilmersdorf (Berlin), Germany (1993)
- Haren, Germany (1991)
- Westerwolde, Netherlands (1991)
