= Festungsfront Oder-Warthe-Bogen =

Międzyrzecki Rejon Umocniony
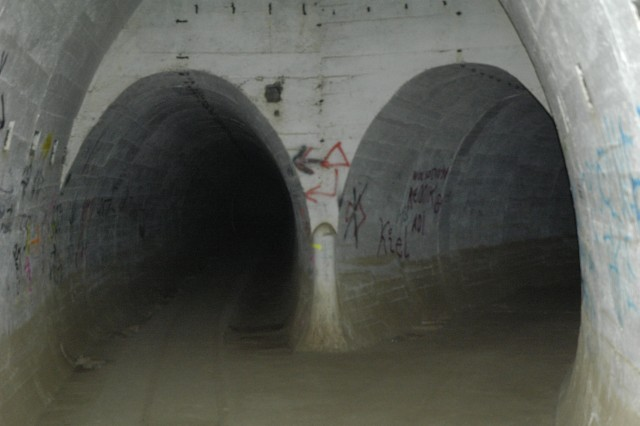
- System of tunnels

- Location within the German Reich Location in modern Poland
- Coordinates: 52°22′17″N 15°30′21″E
- Country: Poland
- Voivodeship: Lubusz
- Built: 1934–44

Plan of MRU

The Festungsfront Oder-Warthe-Bogen (lit. 'Fortified Front Oder–Warta Bend'), also called the Festung im Oder-Warthe-Bogen or Ostwall (East Wall), and in Polish the Międzyrzecki Rejon Umocniony, MRU (Międzyrzecz Fortification Region), was a fortified military defence line of Nazi Germany between the Oder and Warta rivers, near Międzyrzecz. The part around Międzyrzecz (Meseritz) has been colloquially referred to as the Regenwurmlager (lit. 'Earthworm camp'). Built in 1934–44, it was the most technologically advanced fortification system of Nazi Germany, and remains one of the largest systems of this type in the world today. It consists of around 100 concrete defence structures partially interconnected by a network of tunnels. Some of the forts and tunnels are available for visiting.

The most interesting part is the central section, which begins in the south with the so-called Boryszyn Loop near the village of Boryszyn (Burschen) and extends about 12 km to the north. Another interesting part of MRU is located in Pniewo (Fischerhaus) in the Międzyrzecz District. In the central section the bunkers are interconnected with a system of tunnels, 32 kilometres (20 mi) long and up to 40 metres (130 ft) deep. In the underground system there are also railway stations, workshops, engine rooms and barracks.

It is also among the top 10 largest hibernation sites for bats in Europe according to the data of the EUROBATS Agreement. The numbers of hibernating bats exceeds 39,000 individuals in some years. 12 species have been found hibernating there and one more (the northern bat) roosts in cooler stand alone bunkers not connected with the underground system.

== History ==
The design works of the fortified defence line started in Germany in 1932. The first stage, until 1935, included constructing of water obstacles and 12 light bunkers. Adolf Hitler visited the construction site in the end of 1935. The end of works was scheduled for 1951.

The Soviet army reached the defence line in the course of the Vistula–Oder Offensive in January 1945, before the Germans could deploy troops; the line was broken in three days.
