= Międzyrzecz County =

Międzyrzecz County Powiat międzyrzecki
- County
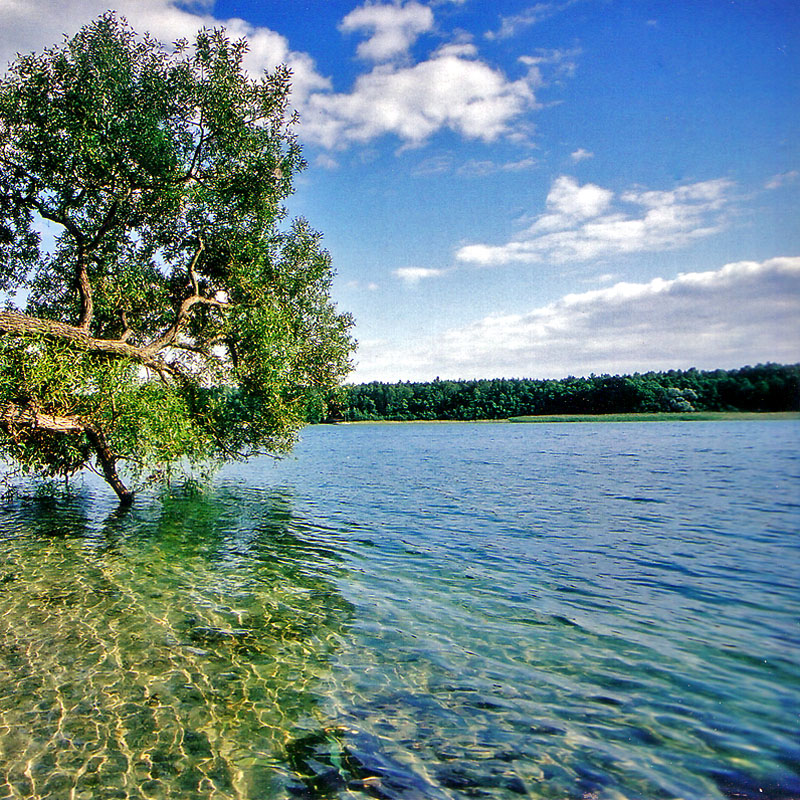

- Flag Coat of arms

- Location within the voivodeship
- Coordinates (Międzyrzecz): 52°26′54″N 15°35′18″E
- Country: Poland
- Voivodeship: Lubusz
- Seat: Międzyrzecz
- Gminas: Total 6: Gmina Bledzew; Gmina Międzyrzecz; Gmina Przytoczna; Gmina Pszczew; Gmina Skwierzyna; Gmina Trzciel

Area
  - Total: 1,387.61 km^{2} (535.76 sq mi)

Population (2019-06-30)
  - Total: 57,851
  - Density: 41.691/km^{2} (107.98/sq mi)
  - Urban: 30,056
  - Rural: 27,795
- Car plates: FMI
- Website: http://www.powiat-miedzyrzecki.pl

Międzyrzecz County (Polish: Powiat międzyrzecki) is a unit of territorial administration and local government (powiat) in Lubusz Voivodeship, western Poland. It came into being on January 1, 1999, as a result of the Polish local government reforms passed in 1998. Its administrative seat and largest town is Międzyrzecz, which lies 48 km (30 mi) south-east of Gorzów Wielkopolski and 68 km (42 mi) north of Zielona Góra. The county also contains the towns of Skwierzyna, lying 19 km (12 mi) north of Międzyrzecz, and Trzciel, 25 km (16 mi) south-east of Międzyrzecz.

The county covers an area of 1,387.61 square kilometres (535.76 sq mi). As of 2019 its total population is 57,851, out of which the population of Międzyrzecz is 17,994, that of Skwierzyna is 9,671, that of Trzciel is 2,391, and the rural population is 27,795.

== Neighbouring counties ==
Międzyrzecz County is bordered by Strzelce-Drezdenko County to the north, Międzychód County to the north-east, Nowy Tomyśl County to the east, Świebodzin County to the south, Sulęcin County to the west and Gorzów County to the north-west.

== Administrative divisions ==
The county is subdivided into six gminas (three urban-rural and three rural). These are listed in the following table, in descending order of population.

Gmina	Type	Area (km^{2})	Population (2019)	Seat
Gmina Międzyrzecz	urban-rural	315.32	24,942	Międzyrzecz
Gmina Skwierzyna	urban-rural	284.81	12,178	Skwierzyna
Gmina Trzciel	urban-rural	177.51	6,451	Trzciel
Gmina Przytoczna	rural	184.82	5,618	Przytoczna
Gmina Bledzew	rural	247.48	4,382	Bledzew
Gmina Pszczew	rural	177.67	4,280	Pszczew
