= Szarcz Lake =

Lake in Poland

- Szarcz Duży, Szarzeńskie Lake
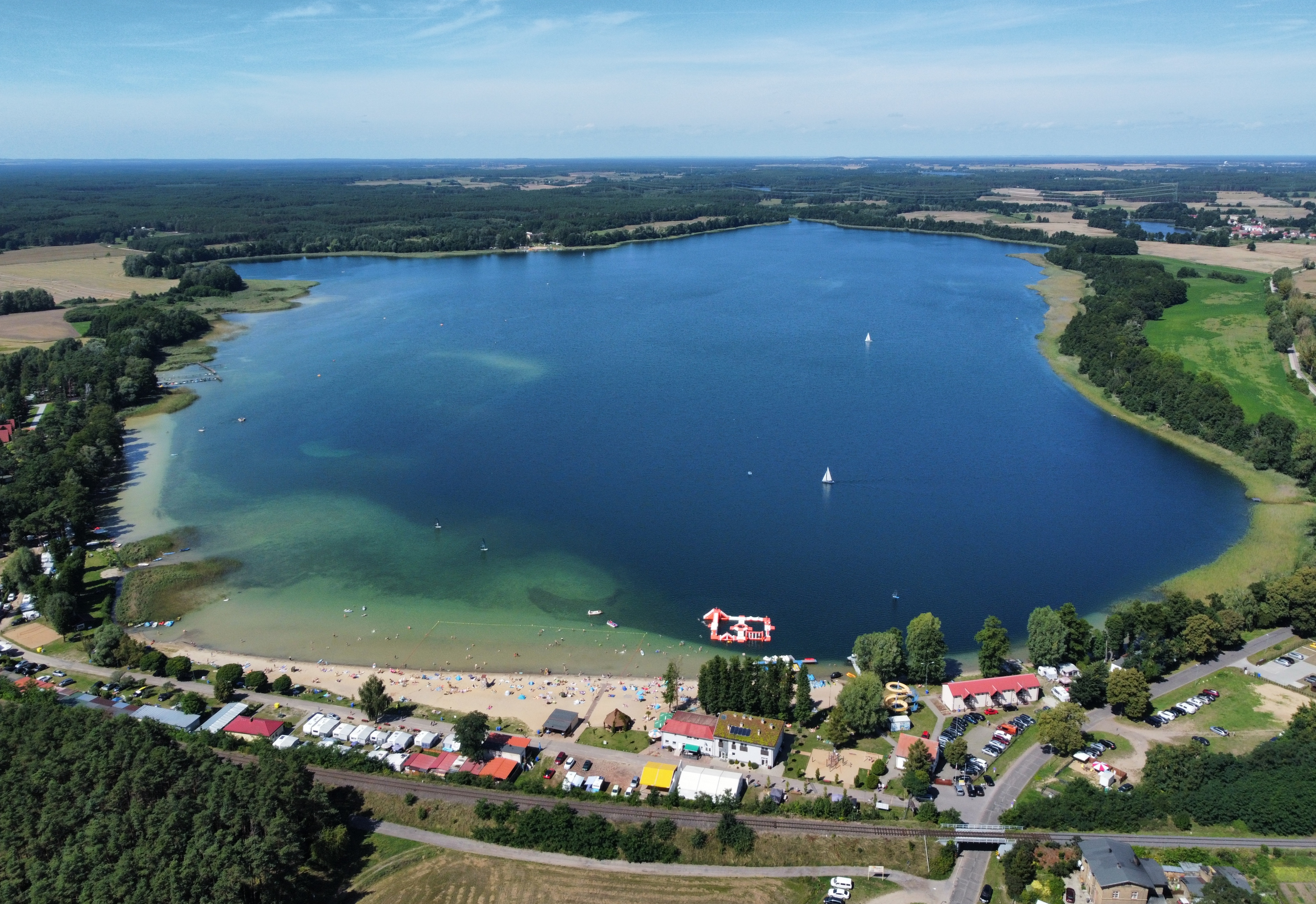
- Aerial view of the main beach
- Interactive map of Szarcz Lake
- Location: Szarcz, Pszczew (Poland)
- Coordinates: 52°29′42″N 15°45′18″E
- Primary outflows: Męcinka river
- Catchment area: 3.9 km^{2} (1.5 mi^{2})
- Max. length: 2.4 km (1.5 mi)
- Max. width: 1.3 km (0.8 mi)
- Surface area: 1.6–1.7 km^{2} (0.6–0.7 mi^{2})
- Average depth: 7.9 m (26 ft)
- Max. depth: 14.5 m (48 ft)
- Water volume: 13,465,800 m^{3} (475,540,000 ft^{3})
- Shore length^{1}: 7.3 km (4.5 mi)
- Surface elevation: 56.3 m (185 ft)
- ^{1} Shore length is not a well-defined measure.

Szarcz Lake is a lake located in the Lubusz Lake District in the Zbąszyń Depression, in the Lubusz Voivodeship, in the Międzyrzecz County, Gmina Pszczew, at the northwestern edge of the village of Pszczew. The lake has been developed for tourism and recreation purposes. Numerous recreational buildings are located at the southeastern and western ends.

== Location and description ==
Szarcz Lake is situated in the eastern part of the Międzyrzecz County, within the Zbąszyń Depression. The lake is mainly surrounded by agricultural lands, with forests located only near the southern shore, beyond the slope of the Międzyrzecz–Międzychód railway line. The lakebed is hard and sandy but very diverse. The deepest parts of the lake are adjacent to significant shallow areas covered with emergent vegetation. Excess water is drained through a small stream to the north, passing through the Białe, Czarne, and Lubikowskie lakes, eventually reaching the Warta river.

== Hydronymics ==
The name Szarcz Lake appears in sources from 1564. Until 1945, it was called Scharziger See. The current name was officially adopted on 17 September 1949. According to official records compiled by the Commission for the Names of Localities and Physiographic Objects and the National Register of Geographical Names, the name of this lake is Szarcz. In documents of the Polish Angling Association, the lake is referred to as Szarcz Duży, while in the documentation of the Voivodeship Inspectorate of Environmental Protection, another name given is Szarzeńskie Lake.

== Morphometrics ==
According to data from the Inland Fisheries Institute, the surface area of the lake's water mirror is 1.7 km. The average depth of the water body is 7.9 m, and the maximum depth is 14.5 m. The water surface is at an elevation of 56.3 m above sea level. The volume of the lake is 13,465,800 m³. The maximum length of the lake is 2.4 km, and its width is 1.3 km. The length of the shoreline is 7.3 km.

However, Adam Choiński determined, through planimetry on 1:50,000 scale maps, the size of the lake to be 1.6 km.

According to the digital terrain model provided by Geoportal, the water surface is at an elevation of 55.8 m above sea level.

According to the Polish Hydrographic Division Map, the lake lies within the sixth-level catchment area of the Szarcz Lake Basin. The MPHP identifier is 187781. The catchment area of the lake is 3.9 km².

== Development ==
The waters of Szarcz Lake are managed by the Regional Water Management Board in Poznań. They have established a fishing circuit that includes the waters of the Struga Lubikowska stream and Szarcz Lake (Fishing Circuit of Szarcz Lake on the Struga Lubikowska stream – No. 1). The fishing operations on the lake are conducted by the Polish Angling Association District in Gorzów Wielkopolski.

The lake also serves recreational purposes. There are two designated bathing areas on the lake in accordance with the Bathing Water Directive: OW Karina Beach on Szarcz Lake and the Municipal Beach on Szarcz Lake. In 2022, the water quality at both beaches was rated as excellent.

== Water purity and environmental protection ==
According to data from 1993, 1999, and 2005, the lake's waters were classified as Class II in terms of cleanliness. Studies from 2016 classified the lake's waters as having a good ecological status, corresponding to Class II quality. This quality class was maintained in 2019, with the macrobenthos and ichthyofauna conditions being the decisive factors for the second class, while the state of phytoplankton, macrophytes, and phytobenthos was rated as very good. In the same year, the chemical status of the waters was assessed as below good, with PBDEs and heptachlor content in fish tissues exceeding the norm. The water transparency was measured at 3.7 m.

Szarcz Lake has been classified as moderately resistant to degrading external influences, placing it in the II category of susceptibility to degradation. This means it has average natural conditions. On one hand, it has fairly good morphometric conditions that protect it from the degrading impact of anthropogenic pollution, particularly characterized by a relatively large average depth and a very low annual water exchange rate (4%). On the other hand, the low thermal stratification negatively affects the lake's water quality.

The entire lake is located within the Pszczew Landscape Park and in protected areas under the Natura 2000 program. Under the Habitats Directive, the protected area is called the Obrzańskie Lakes Trough, while the Birds Directive is represented by the Pszczew Lakes and Obra Valley area.
