= Silna (disambiguation) =

Silna is a village in western Poland.

Silna or SILNA may also refer to:

- South Island Landless Natives Act 1906, an Act of Parliament in New Zealand
- Silná, the feminine form of the Czech surname Silný
  - Barbora Silná (born 1989), Czech-Austrian ice dancing coach
- Ozzie and Daniel Silna (1932–2016, 1944), American businessmen
