= Altenhof =

Altenhof may refer to:

- Altenhof, Mecklenburg-Vorpommern, a German municipality in the Mecklenburgische Seenplatte district
- Altenhof, Schleswig-Holstein, a German municipality in the Rendsburg-Eckernförde district
- Altenhof, a German village within the Schorfheide municipality in Brandenburg
- Altenhof, German name for the village of Stary Dwór, Lubusz Voivodeship, Poland
- Schloss Altenhof, a castle in Pfarrkirchen im Mühlkreis, Austria
