= Hans Fuß =

German World War II fighter pilot

- Born: 19 September 1920; Altenhof, Germany
- Died: 10 November 1942 (aged 22); Berlin
- Burial place: Invalid's Cemetery
- Military career
- Allegiance: Nazi Germany
- Branch: Luftwaffe
- Service years: 1939–1942
- Rank: Leutnant (second lieutenant)
- Unit: JG 3
- Conflicts: World War II: Eastern Front
- Awards: Knight's Cross of the Iron Cross

Hans Fuß (19 September 1920 – 10 November 1942) was a former Luftwaffe fighter ace and recipient of the Knight's Cross of the Iron Cross during World War II. Hans Fuss was credited with 71 victories in over 300 missions. All his victories were recorded over the Eastern Front.

== Career ==
Fuß was born on 19 September 1920 in Altenhof near Meseritz in West Prussia, present-day Stary Dwór in western Poland. Following flight training, (Note: Flight training in the Luftwaffe progressed through the levels A1, A2 and B1, B2, referred to as A/B flight training. A training included theoretical and practical training in aerobatics, navigation, long-distance flights and dead-stick landings. The B courses included high-altitude flights, instrument flights, night landings and training to handle the aircraft in difficult situations.) he was posted to 4. Staffel (4th squadron) of Jagdgeschwader 3 (JG 3–3rd Fighter Wing) in early 1941.

=== War against the Soviet Union ===
In preparation for Operation Barbarossa, the German invasion of the Soviet Union, II. Gruppe headed further east on 18 June. Following a stopover at Kraków, the unit was moved to Hostynne. At the start of the campaign, JG 3 under the command of Major (Major) Günther Lützow was subordinated to the 5th Air Corps, under the command of General der Flieger (General of the Aviators) Robert Ritter von Greim, itself part of Luftflotte 4 (4th Air Fleet), under the command of Generaloberst (Colonel General) Alexander Löhr. These air elements supported Generalfeldmarschall (Field Marshal) Gerd von Rundstedt's Army Group South, with the objective of capturing Ukraine and its capital Kiev. At 17:00 on 21 June 1941, the 5th Air Corps, based at Lipsko, briefed the various unit commanders of the upcoming attack. (Note: All times used in this section are Central European Time unless otherwise noted.) That evening, Gruppenkommandeur (group commander) of II. Gruppe Lothar Keller informed his subordinates of the attack. The next day, the first day of Operation Barbarossa, Fuß claimed his first aerial victory.

=== Eastern Front ===
II. Gruppe had been ordered to the Eastern Front in preparation for Case Blue, the strategic summer offensive in southern Russia. While based at Pilsen, Hauptmann Kurt Brändle took over command of the Gruppe after the former commander Hauptmann Karl-Heinz Krahl had been killed in action over Malta. The Gruppe was then deployed on the left wing of Army Group South where it was based at Chuhuiv near the Donets on 19 May. There, Fuß served with the Gruppenstab as an adjutant to Brändle.

=== Squadron leader ===
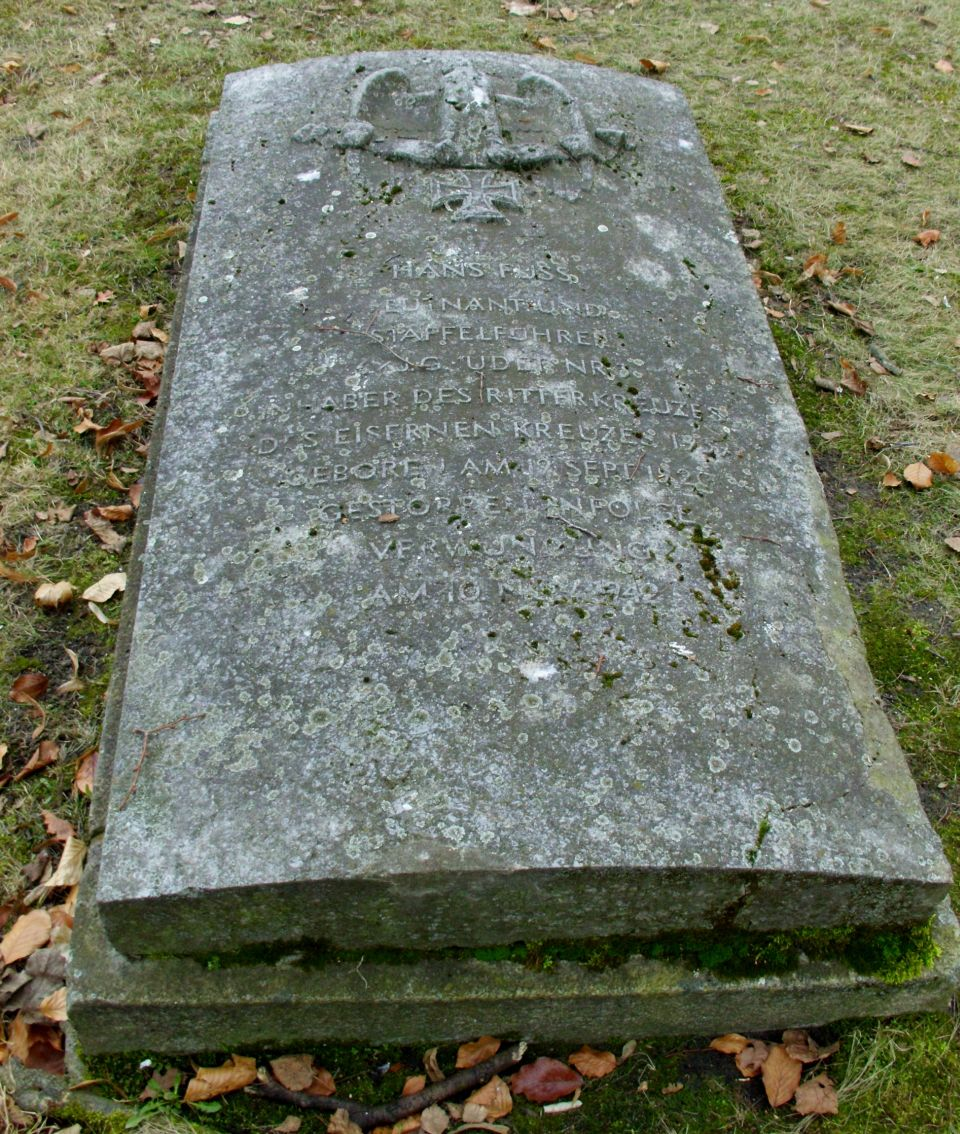
Grave of Hans Fuss in the Invalids' Cemetery

On 1 August, Fuß was appointed Staffelkapitän (squadron leader) of 6. Staffel of JG 3 after its former commander Oberleutnant Hans-Jürgen Waldhelm had been transferred. On 7 August, the German 6th Army attacked Soviet forces at Kalach, encircling elements of the Soviet 62nd Army west of the Don. During this battle, II. Gruppe supported the advance, claiming 23 aerial victories, including six by Fuß, making him an "ace-in-a-day".

On 14 September 1942, Fuß claimed a Yakovlev Yak-1 fighter shot down, his last aerial victory claim. During this battle, he engaged with Lydia Litvyak and his Messerschmitt Bf 109 G-2 (Werknummer 13758—factory number) took a hit in the fuel tank causing his engine to seize. During the forced landing at Dedyurevo, an airfield approximately 75 kilometers (47 miles) northeast of Smolensk, his aircraft crashed and Fuß was severely injured. Fuß died of gangrene following the amputation of one of his legs at a Luftwaffe hospital in Berlin on 10 November 1942.

== Summary of career ==
=== Aerial victory claims ===
According to US historian David T. Zabecki, Fuß was credited with 71 aerial victories. Obermaier and Spick also list Fuß with 71 aerial victories, all of which claimed on the Eastern Front, in over 300 combat missions. Mathews and Foreman, authors of Luftwaffe Aces — Biographies and Victory Claims, researched the German Federal Archives and found records for 69 aerial victory claims, all of which claimed on the Eastern Front.

Victory claims were logged to a map-reference (PQ = Planquadrat), for example "PQ 4072". The Luftwaffe grid map (Jägermeldenetz) covered all of Europe, western Russia and North Africa and was composed of rectangles measuring 15 minutes of latitude by 30 minutes of longitude, an area of about 360 square miles (930 km^{2}). These sectors were then subdivided into 36 smaller units to give a location area 3 km × 4 km (1.9 mi × 2.5 mi) in size.

Chronicle of aerial victories
This and the ♠ (Ace of spades) indicates those aerial victories which made Fuß an ace-in-a-day, a term which designates a fighter pilot who has shot down five or more airplanes in a single day. This and the ? (exclamation mark) indicates information discrepancies listed by Prien, Stemmer, Rodeike, Bock, Mathews, and Foreman.
Claim	Date	Time	Type	Location	Claim	Date	Time	Type	Location
– 4. Steffel of Jagdgeschwader 3 – Operation Barbarossa – 22 June – 1 November 1941
1	22 June 1941	06:50	I-153	west of Lemberg	14	13 September 1941	17:29	V-11 (Il-2)	
2	22 June 1941	07:00	I-16	west of Lemberg	15	17 September 1941	15:40	I-17 (MiG-1)	
3	23 June 1941	09:50	SB-2		16	19 September 1941	14:05	I-16	
4	23 June 1941	09:55	SB-2	south of Volodymyr-Volynskyi	17	19 September 1941	17:30	V-11 (Il-2)	
5	25 June 1941	09:00	DB-3	west of Lutsk	18	24 September 1941	13:37	I-17 (MiG-1)	
6	25 June 1941	09:20	I-16	8 km (5.0 mi) northwest of Berestechko	19	17 October 1941	09:15	I-16	
7	30 June 1941	14:45	I-16	north of Ternopil	20	17 October 1941	09:15	I-16	
8	9 July 1941	16:10	DB-3	northwest of Gudnow	21	17 October 1941	10:10	I-153	25 km (16 mi) east of Perekop
9	9 July 1941	16:13	DB-3	northwest of Gudnow	22	17 October 1941	10:30	Il-2	
10	12 July 1941	17:50	DB-3		23	19 October 1941	12:40	Pe-2	
11	30 August 1941	14:25	V-11 (Il-2)		24	22 October 1941	07:20	Pe-2	
12	7 September 1941	13:20	V-11 (Il-2)	1 km (0.62 mi) northeast of Potoki	25	23 October 1941	16:25	I-61 (MiG-3)	
13	13 September 1941	17:22	V-11 (Il-2)						
– Stab II. Gruppe of Jagdgeschwader 3 "Udet" – Eastern Front – 26 April – 31 July 1942
26	23 May 1942	07:27	I-61 (MiG-3)		44	1 July 1942	16:27	Boston	
27	23 May 1942	07:28	I-61 (MiG-3)		45	1 July 1942	18:52	Il-2	
28	26 May 1942	09:35	I-61 (MiG-3)	3 km (1.9 mi) east of Mospanowo	46	4 July 1942	10:25	MiG-1	northeast of Kastornoye
29? (Note: This claim is not listed by Mathews and Foreman, nor by Prien, Stemmer, Rodeike and Bock in The Fighter Units of the German Air Force 1934 to 1945—Part 9/II—From the 1942 Summer Campaign to the Defeat at Stalingrad—1 May 1942 to 3 February 1943.)	26 May 1942	17:10	unknown		47	4 July 1942	19:21	Pe-2	
30	27 May 1942	18:22	MiG-1		48	6 July 1942	18:02	Pe-2	
31	29 May 1942	15:55	MiG-1		49	6 July 1942	18:05	Pe-2	
32	29 May 1942	15:58	MiG-1		50	6 July 1942	18:25	Hurricane	
33	29 May 1942	16:04	Pe-2		51	7 July 1942	17:14	Pe-2	
34	12 June 1942	10:56	Su-2		52	7 July 1942	17:18	Pe-2	
35	13 June 1942	10:19	Il-2		53	8 July 1942	19:22	Pe-2	
36	13 June 1942	10:32	MiG-1		54	8 July 1942	19:26	Pe-2	
37	22 June 1942	17:55	Hurricane	north of Kupiansk	55	8 July 1942	19:30	Pe-2	
38	23 June 1942	18:10	LaGG-3		56	10 July 1942	09:53	Hurricane	
39	23 June 1942	18:17	LaGG-3		57	17 July 1942	10:11	Il-2	
40	24 June 1942	11:27	LaGG-3		58	17 July 1942	17:51	Il-2	
41	30 June 1942	10:35	P-39		59	20 July 1942	15:50	Il-2	
42	30 June 1942	10:40	Boston		60	23 July 1942	13:05	Yak-1	
43	30 June 1942	10:48	Boston						
– 6. Staffel of Jagdgeschwader 3 "Udet" – Eastern Front – 1 August – 14 September 1942
61♠	7 August 1942	10:20	Il-2	northwest of Plotowitoje	67	9 August 1942	10:05	MiG-1	north of Kalach
62♠	7 August 1942	10:24	Il-2	east of Frolow	68	17 August 1942	10:56	LaGG-3	PQ 4072
63♠	7 August 1942	13:50	LaGG-3	northwest of Plotowitoje	69	21 August 1942	17:47	Il-2	PQ 49611
64♠	7 August 1942	13:57	LaGG-3	north of Plotowitoje	70	21 August 1942	17:48	Il-2	PQ 49612
65♠	7 August 1942	13:58	MiG-1	north of Plotowitoje	71? (Note: This claim is not listed by Mathews and Foreman.)	14 September 1942	—	Yak-1	
66♠	7 August 1942	14:00	MiG-1	north of Plotowitoje					

=== Awards ===
- Iron Cross (1939) 2nd and 1st Class
- Honor Goblet of the Luftwaffe on 23 March 1942 as Leutnant and pilot (Note: According to Obermaier on 22 March 1942.)
- German Cross in Gold on 10 July 1942 as Leutnant in the II./Jagdgeschwader 3
- Knight's Cross of the Iron Cross on 23 August 1942 as Leutnant and pilot in the II./Jagdgeschwader 3 "Udet"
