= Silny =

Silny may refer to:

- Silný, a Czech surname
- Soviet destroyer Silny
