= Żydowo, Lubusz Voivodeship =

Żydowo
- Village
- Location within Poland
- Coordinates: 52°23′50″N 15°44′55″E
- Country: Poland
- Voivodeship: Lubusz
- County: Międzyrzecz
- Gmina: Trzciel

Żydowo [ʐɨˈdɔvɔ] is a village in the administrative district of Gmina Trzciel, within Międzyrzecz County, Lubusz Voivodeship, in western Poland.
