= Smolniki, Lubusz Voivodeship =

Smolniki
- Settlement
- Location within Poland
- Coordinates: 52°17′23″N 15°51′50″E
- Country: Poland
- Voivodeship: Lubusz
- County: Międzyrzecz
- Gmina: Trzciel

Smolniki [smɔlˈniki] is a settlement in the administrative district of Gmina Trzciel, within Międzyrzecz County, Lubusz Voivodeship, in western Poland.
