= Stołuń =

- Village
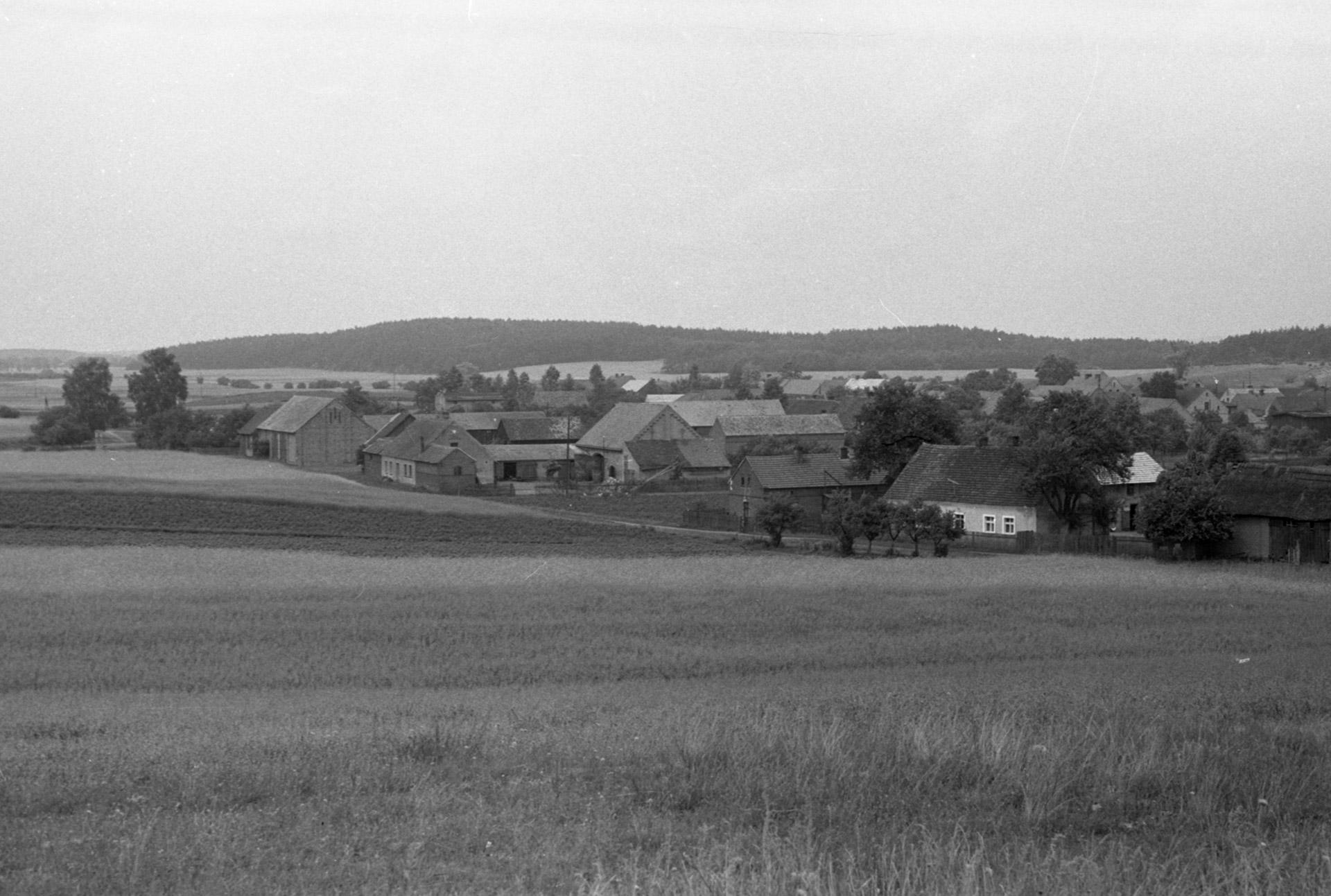
- View of Stołuń in 1971

- Location within Poland
- Coordinates: 52°30′30″N 15°41′55″E
- Country: Poland
- Voivodeship: Lubusz
- County: Międzyrzecz
- Gmina: Pszczew
- Time zone: UTC+1 (CET)
  - Summer (DST): UTC+2 (CEST)
- Vehicle registration: FMI

Stołuń [ˈstɔwuɲ] is a village in the administrative district of Gmina Pszczew, within Międzyrzecz County, Lubusz Voivodeship, in western Poland.

Stołuń was a private church village, administratively located in the Poznań County in the Poznań Voivodeship in the Greater Poland Province of the Kingdom of Poland.
