= Lutol Suchy =

- Village
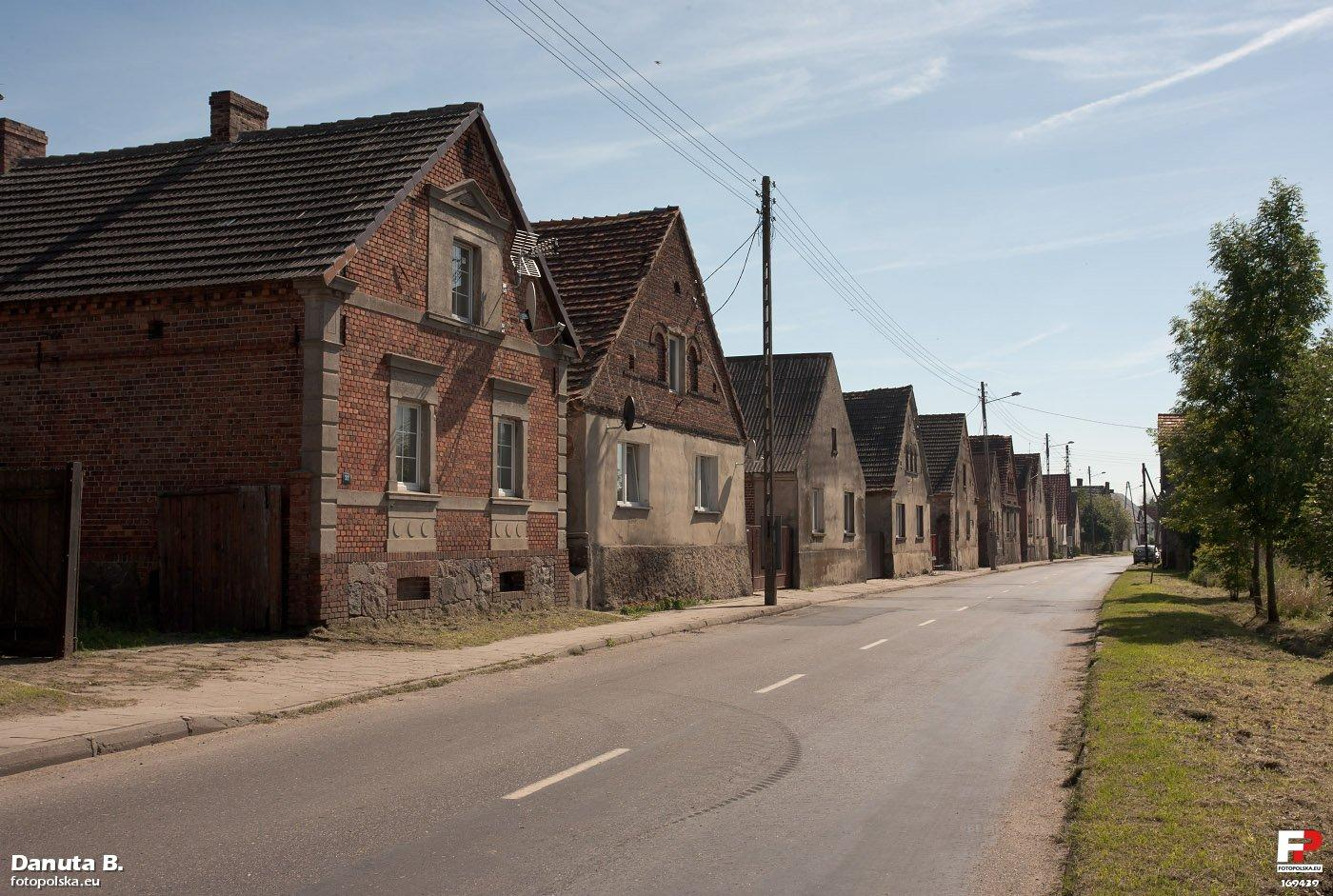

- Location within Poland
- Coordinates: 52°20′N 15°53′E
- Country: Poland
- Voivodeship: Lubusz
- County: Międzyrzecz
- Gmina: Trzciel
- Population: 510

Lutol Suchy [ˈlutɔl ˈsuxɨ] (formerly German: Dürrlettel) is a village in the administrative district of Gmina Trzciel, within Międzyrzecz County, Lubusz Voivodeship, in western Poland.
