= Borowy Młyn, Lubusz Voivodeship =

Borowy Młyn
- Village
- Location within Poland
- Coordinates: 52°27′N 15°45′E
- Country: Poland
- Voivodeship: Lubusz
- County: Międzyrzecz
- Gmina: Pszczew
- Population: 90

Borowy Młyn [bɔˈrɔvɨ ˈmwɨn] is a village in the administrative district of Gmina Pszczew, within Międzyrzecz County, Lubusz Voivodeship, in western Poland.
