= Pszczew =

- Village
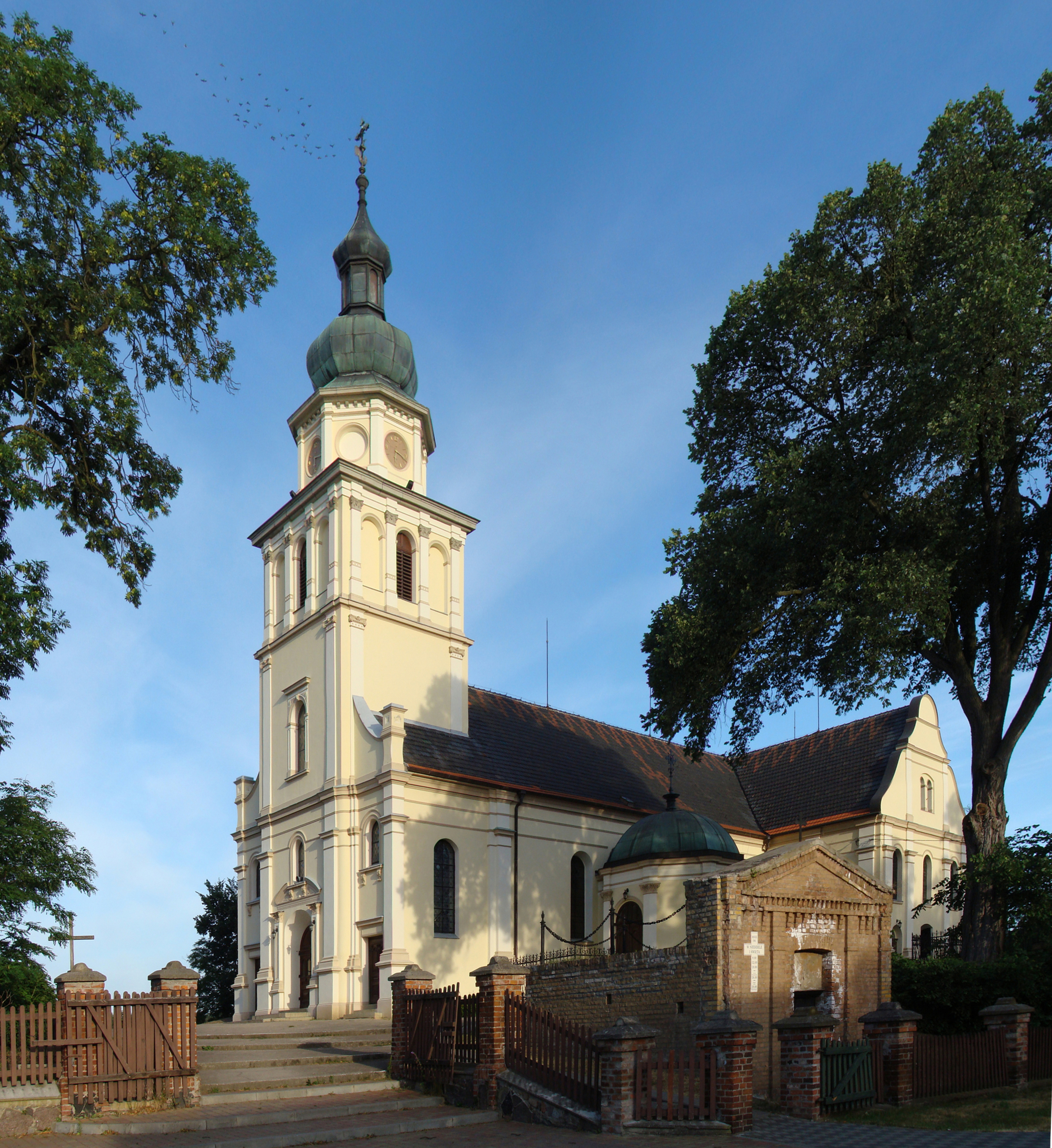
- Saint Mary Magdalene Church

- Coat of arms

- Location within Poland
- Coordinates: 52°28′N 15°46′E
- Country: Poland
- Voivodeship: Lubusz
- County: Międzyrzecz
- Gmina: Pszczew

Population
  - Total: 1,826
- Time zone: UTC+1 (CET)
  - Summer (DST): UTC+2 (CEST)
- Postal code: 66-330
- Vehicle registration: FMI
- Website: http://www.pszczew.pl

Pszczew [pʂˈt͡ʂɛf] is a village in Międzyrzecz County, Lubusz Voivodeship, in western Poland. It is the seat of the gmina (administrative district) called Gmina Pszczew. It is situated between the Kochle and Szarcz lakes.

The village gives its name to the protected area known as the Pszczew Landscape Park.

== History ==
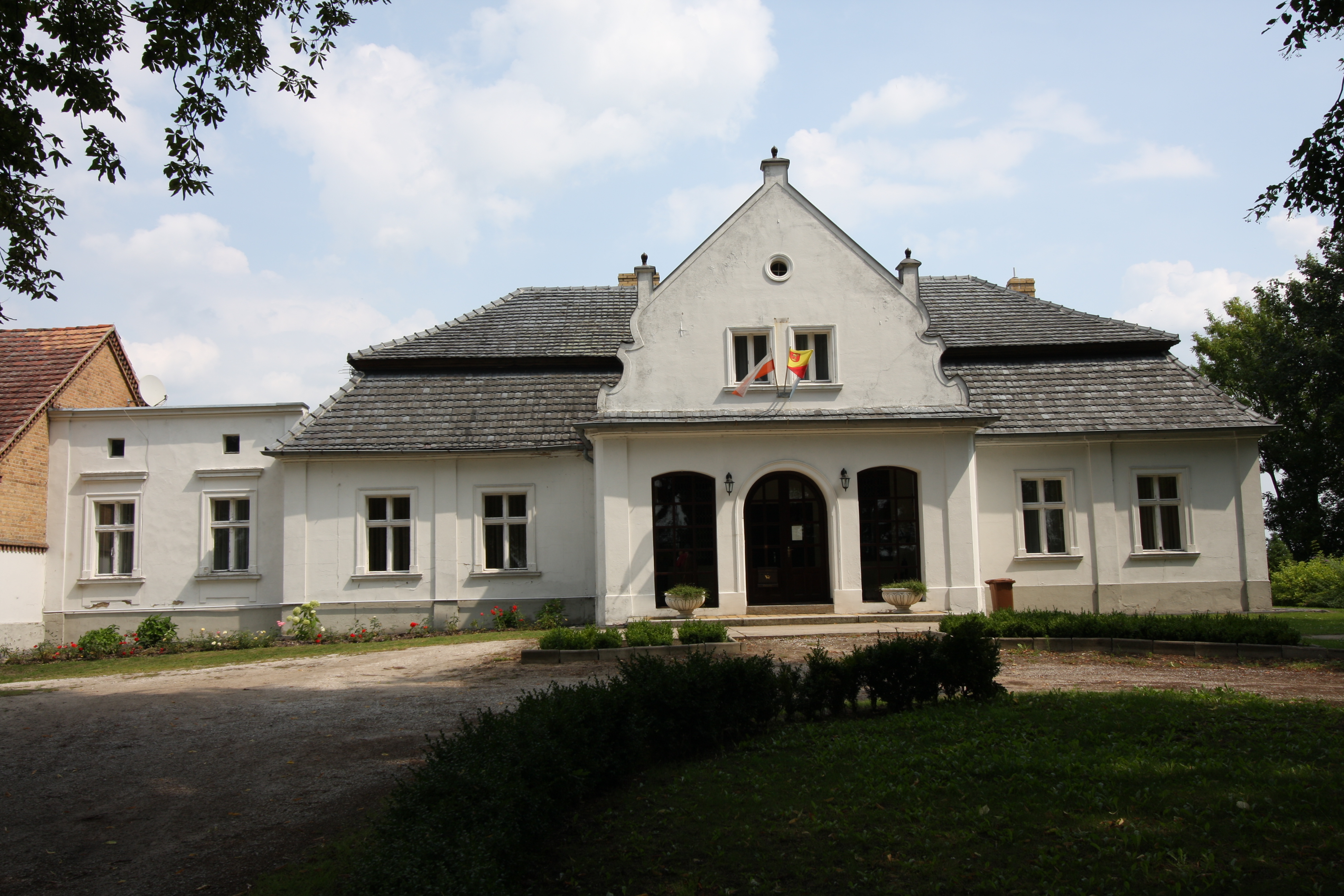
18th-century rectory

As part of the region of Greater Poland, i.e. the cradle of the Polish state, the area formed part of Poland since its establishment in the 10th century. Pszczew was the location of a motte-and-bailey castle from the 13th−14th centuries. Pszczew was a private church town, administratively located in the Poznań County in the Poznań Voivodeship in the Greater Poland Province.

As a result of the Second Partition of Poland, in 1793, Pszczew came under Prussian rule. It was temporarily recovered by the Poles from 1807 to 1815, when it belonged to the Duchy of Warsaw, but became part of Prussia once again in 1815, within the Grand Duchy of Posen and after 1848, the Province of Posen.

In 1871, it became part of the German Empire. In 1887, it gained a railway connection with Międzyrzecz (then Meseritz) and Międzychód (then Birnbaum). Pszczew, despite being located in the heavily Germanized western borderlands of Greater Poland, had a majority Polish population. In 1890, only 19.5% of the 1,964 inhabitants were Protestants. The Polish People's Bank also operated in Pszczew. However, after Poland regained independence in the aftermath of World War I, the Treaty of Versailles left the town within the borders of Germany. From 1922 to 1938, it was part of the Frontier March of Posen-West Prussia and from 1938 to 1945, it was part of the Province of Brandenburg.

In 1939, during World War II, the Germans carried out arrests of local Polish leaders and activists (see Nazi crimes against the Polish nation). During the war, firing trenches and an observation post were established at the former medieval motte-and-bailey castle. After the war, Pszczew was returned to Poland and the remaining German inhabitants were expelled in accordance with the Potsdam Agreement.

== Demographics ==
Historical population

Year	Pop.	±%
1871	1,809	—
1880	1,921	+6.2%
1890	1,942	+1.1%
1900	1,983	+2.1%

Year	Pop.	±%
1910	1,863	−6.1%
1925	1,793	−3.8%
1939	1,739	−3.0%

== Cuisine ==
The officially protected traditional food of Pszczew, as designated by the Ministry of Agriculture and Rural Development of Poland, is the Magdaleński linden honey (Miód lipowy magdaleński).
