= Bieleń =

- Village
- Location within Poland
- Coordinates: 52°20′51″N 15°47′36″E
- Country: Poland
- Voivodeship: Lubusz
- County: Międzyrzecz
- Gmina: Trzciel

Bieleń [ˈbjɛlɛɲ] is a village in the administrative district of Gmina Trzciel, within Międzyrzecz County, Lubusz Voivodeship, in western Poland.
