= Biercza =

- Settlement
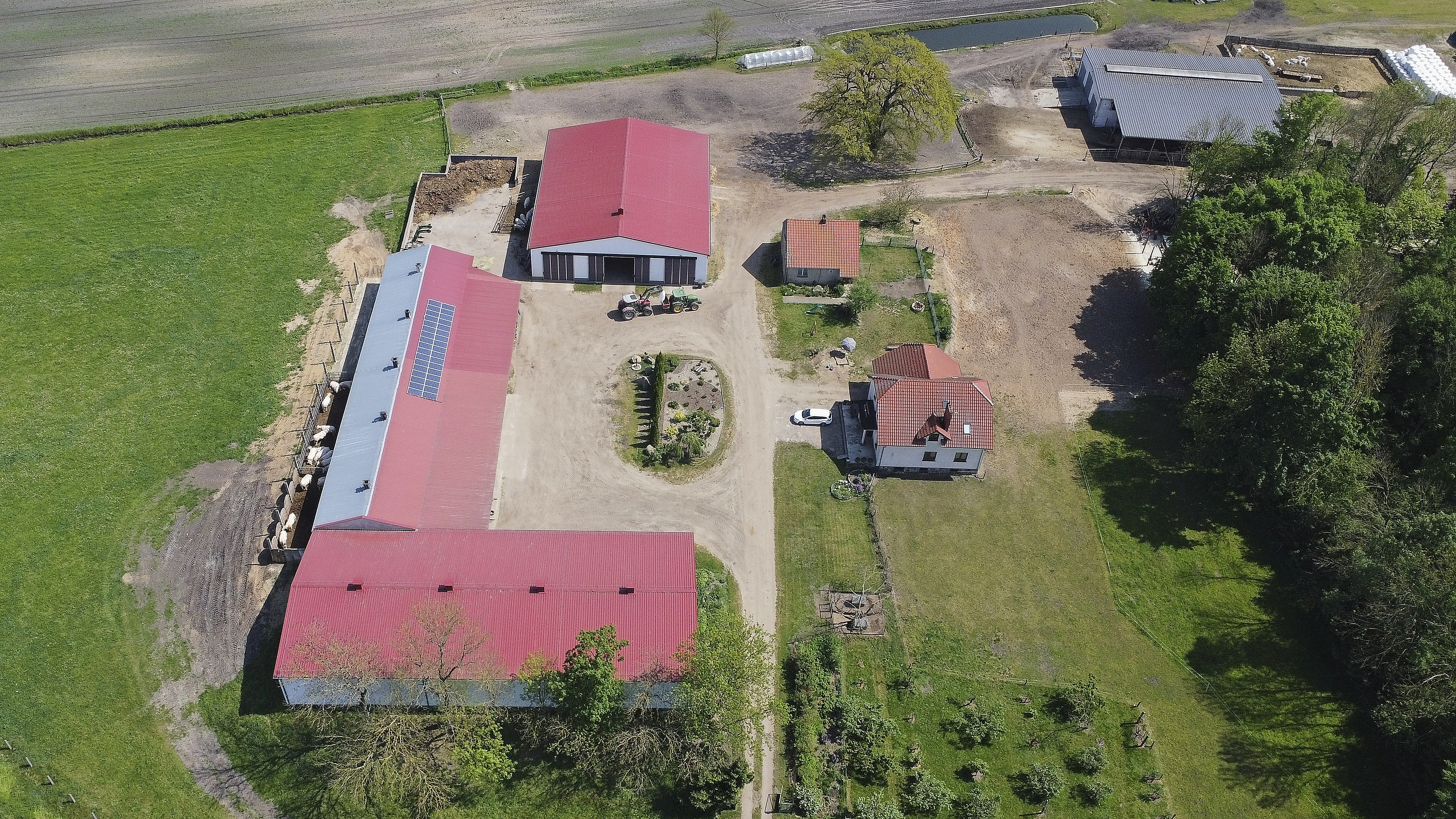

- Location within Poland
- Coordinates: 52°31′37″N 15°47′29″E
- Country: Poland
- Voivodeship: Lubusz
- County: Międzyrzecz
- Gmina: Pszczew

Biercza [ˈbjɛrt͡ʂa] is a settlement in the administrative district of Gmina Pszczew, within Międzyrzecz County, Lubusz Voivodeship, in western Poland.
