= Chociszewo, Lubusz Voivodeship =

Chociszewo
- Village
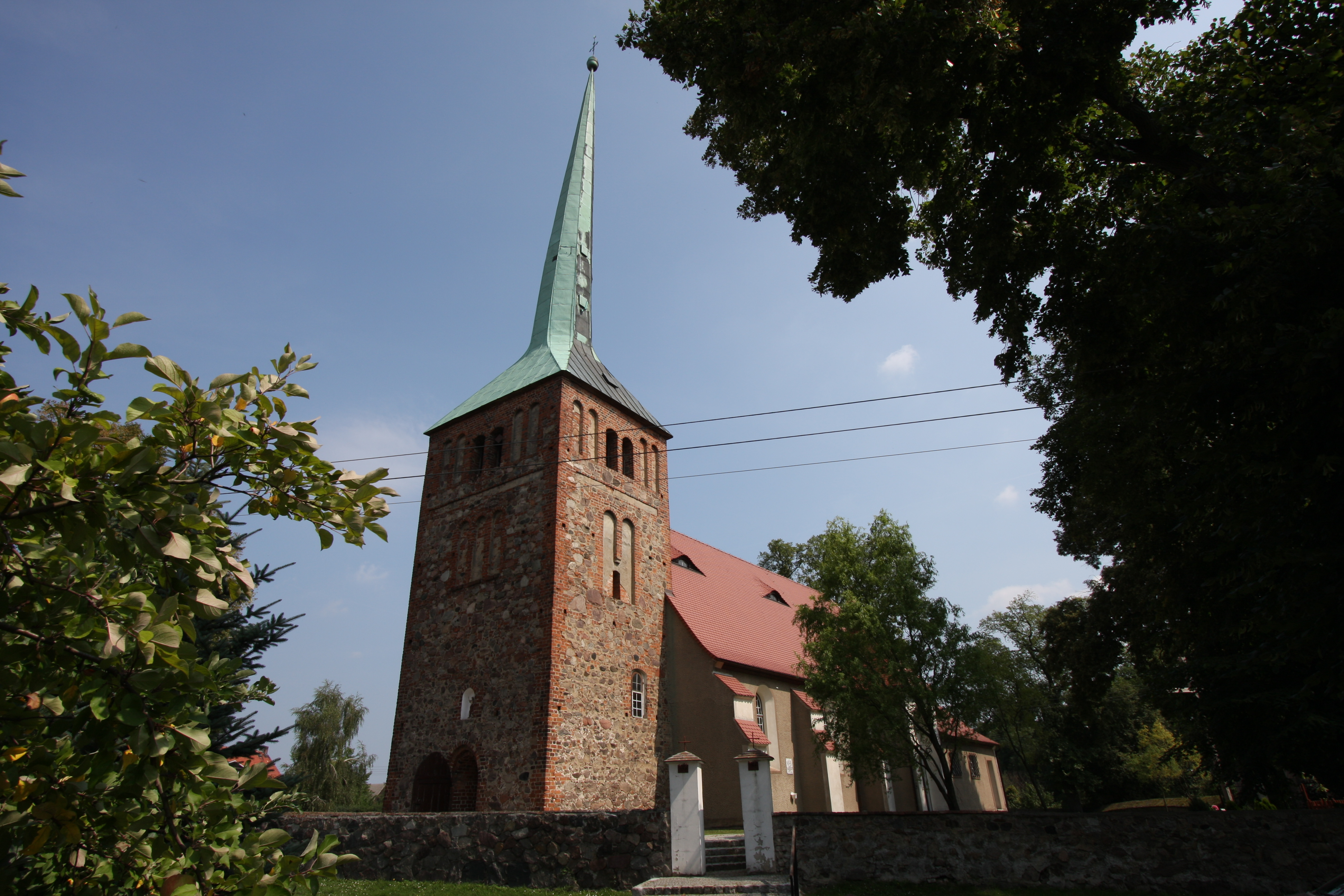
- Church of the Nativity of Saint John the Baptist

- Location within Poland
- Coordinates: 52°18′N 15°45′E
- Country: Poland
- Voivodeship: Lubusz
- County: Międzyrzecz
- Gmina: Trzciel

Population
  - Total: 427
- Time zone: UTC+1 (CET)
  - Summer (DST): UTC+2 (CEST)
- Vehicle registration: FMI

Chociszewo [xɔt͡ɕiˈʂɛvɔ] is a village in the administrative district of Gmina Trzciel, within Międzyrzecz County, Lubusz Voivodeship, in western Poland.

Chociszewo was a private church village, administratively located in the Poznań County in the Poznań Voivodeship in the Greater Poland Province of the Kingdom of Poland.
