= Brzeźno, Międzyrzecz County =

Brzeźno
- Village
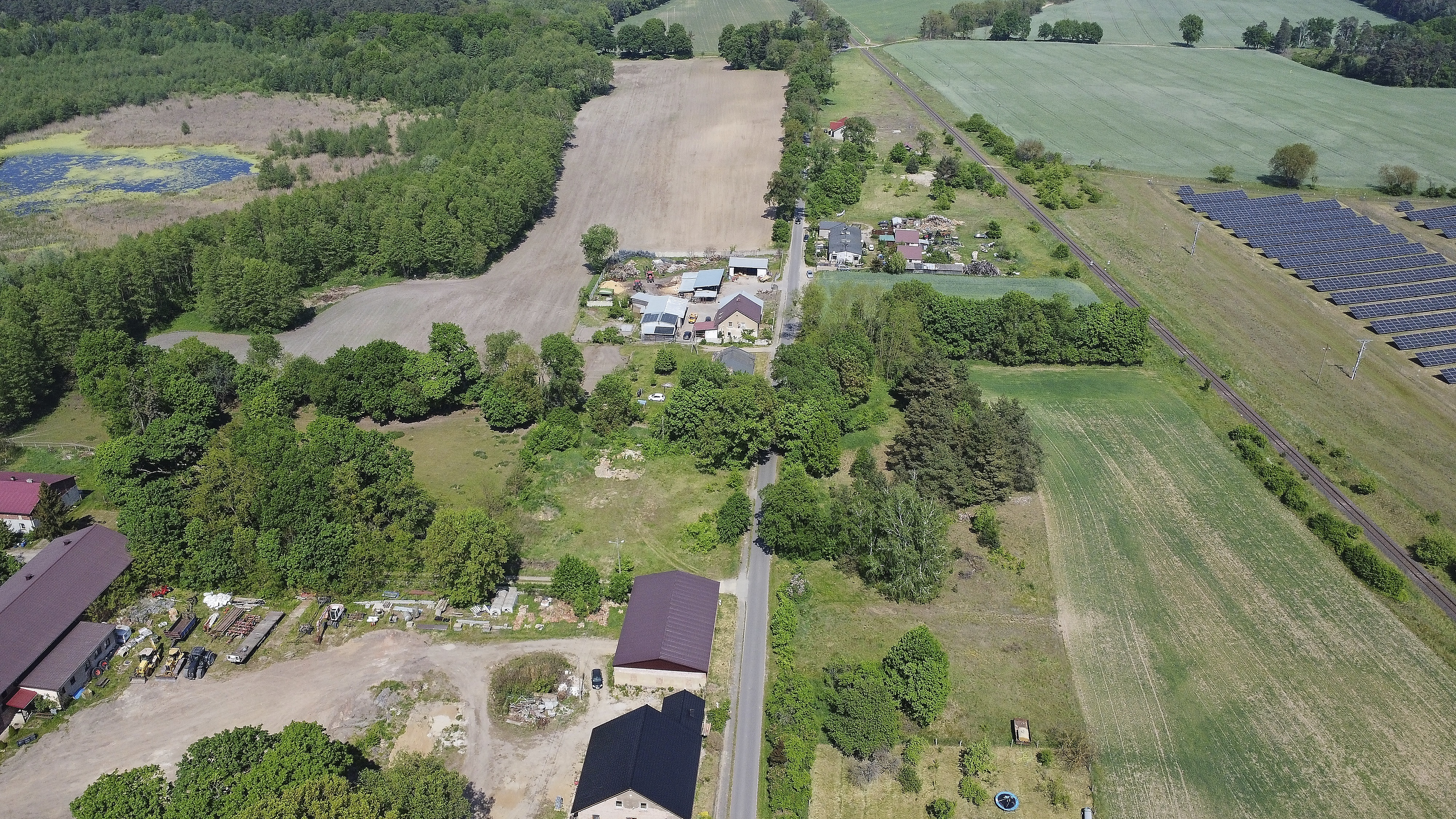

- Location within Poland
- Coordinates: 52°33′N 15°46′E
- Country: Poland
- Voivodeship: Lubusz
- County: Międzyrzecz
- Gmina: Pszczew

Brzeźno [ˈbʐɛʑnɔ] is a village in the administrative district of Gmina Pszczew, within Międzyrzecz County, Lubusz Voivodeship, in western Poland.
