= Policko, Lubusz Voivodeship =

Policko
- Village
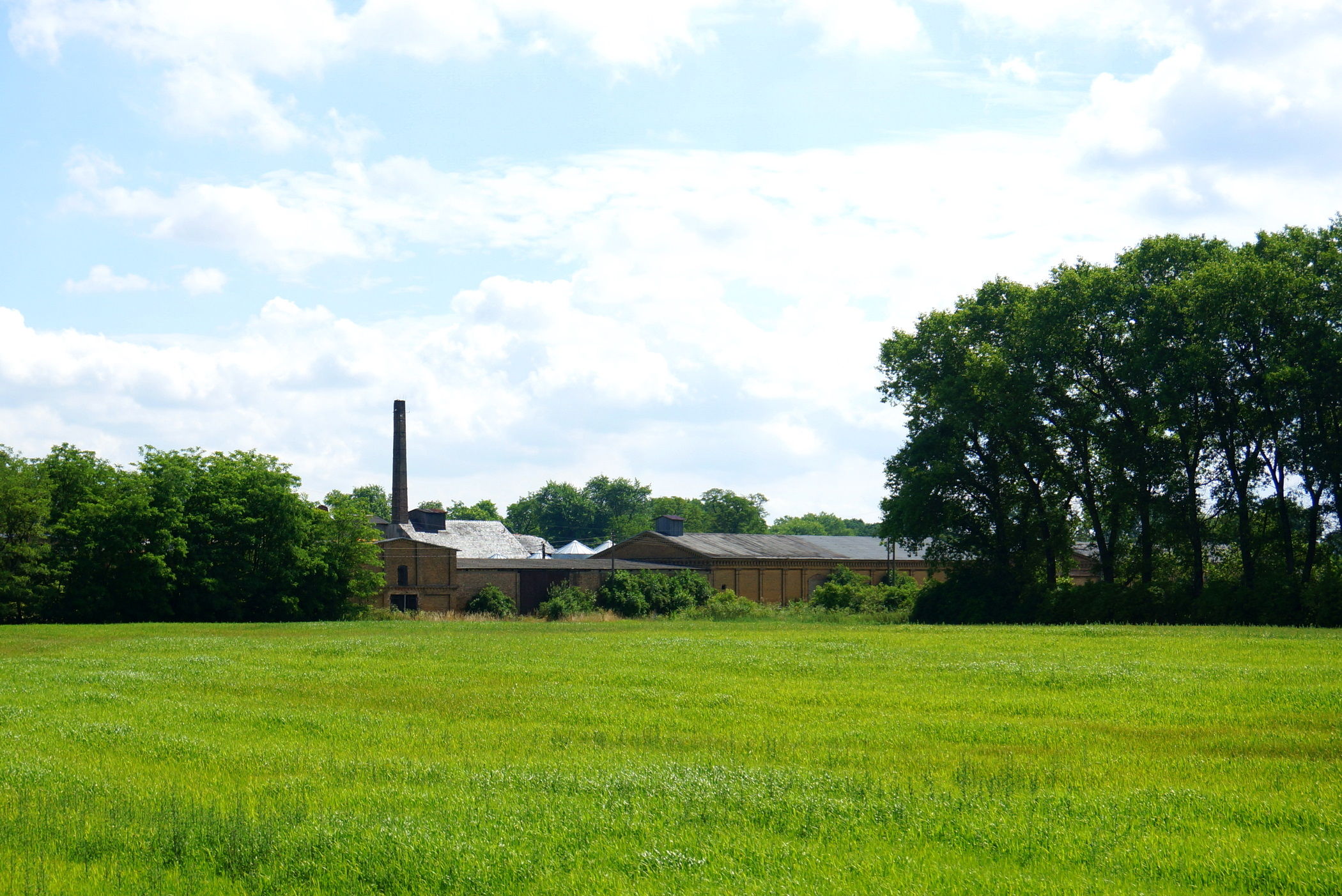

- Location within Poland
- Coordinates: 52°27′N 15°42′E
- Country: Poland
- Voivodeship: Lubusz
- County: Międzyrzecz
- Gmina: Pszczew
- Time zone: UTC+1 (CET)
  - Summer (DST): UTC+2 (CEST)
- Postal code: 66-330
- Vehicle registration: FMI

Policko [pɔˈlit͡skɔ] is a village in the administrative district of Gmina Pszczew, within Międzyrzecz County, Lubusz Voivodeship, in western Poland.

Policko was a private village, administratively located in the Poznań County in the Poznań Voivodeship in the Greater Poland Province of the Kingdom of Poland.
