= Brójce, Lubusz Voivodeship =

Brójce
- Village
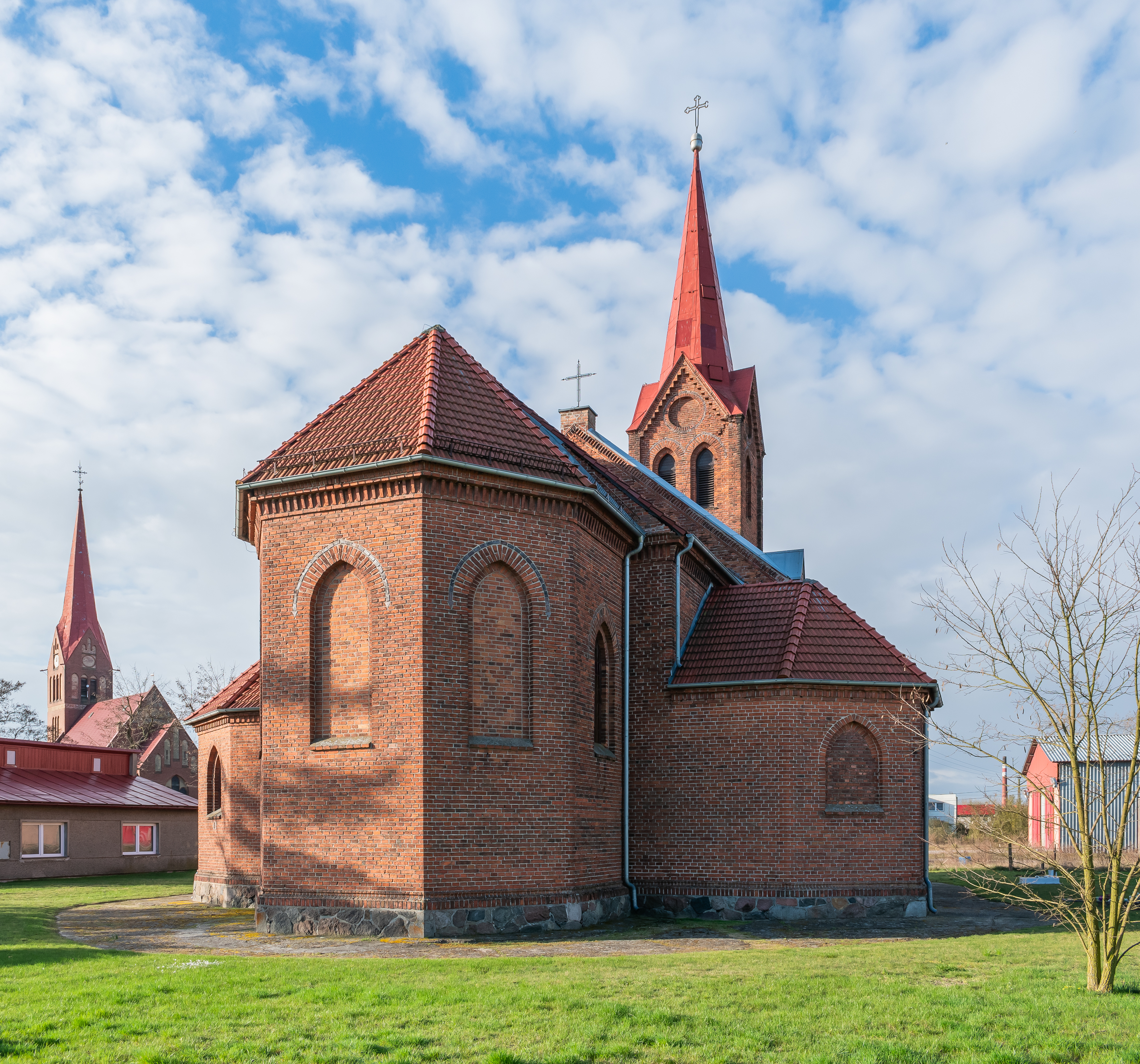
- Holy Name of Mary church in Brójce

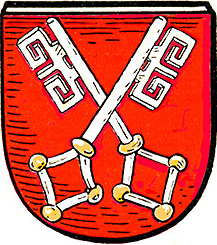
- Coat of arms

- Location within Poland
- Coordinates: 52°18′N 15°40′E
- Country: Poland
- Voivodeship: Lubusz
- County: Międzyrzecz
- Gmina: Trzciel

Population
  - Total: 1,050
- Time zone: UTC+1 (CET)
  - Summer (DST): UTC+2 (CEST)
- Vehicle registration: FMI
- Website: brojce.net

Brójce [ˈbrui̯t͡sɛ] is a village in the administrative district of Gmina Trzciel, within Międzyrzecz County, Lubusz Voivodeship, in western Poland.

Brójce was a royal town of the Kingdom of Poland, administratively located in the Kościan County in the Poznań Voivodeship in the Greater Poland Province of the Kingdom of Poland.
