= Jabłonka, Lubusz Voivodeship =

Jabłonka
- Settlement
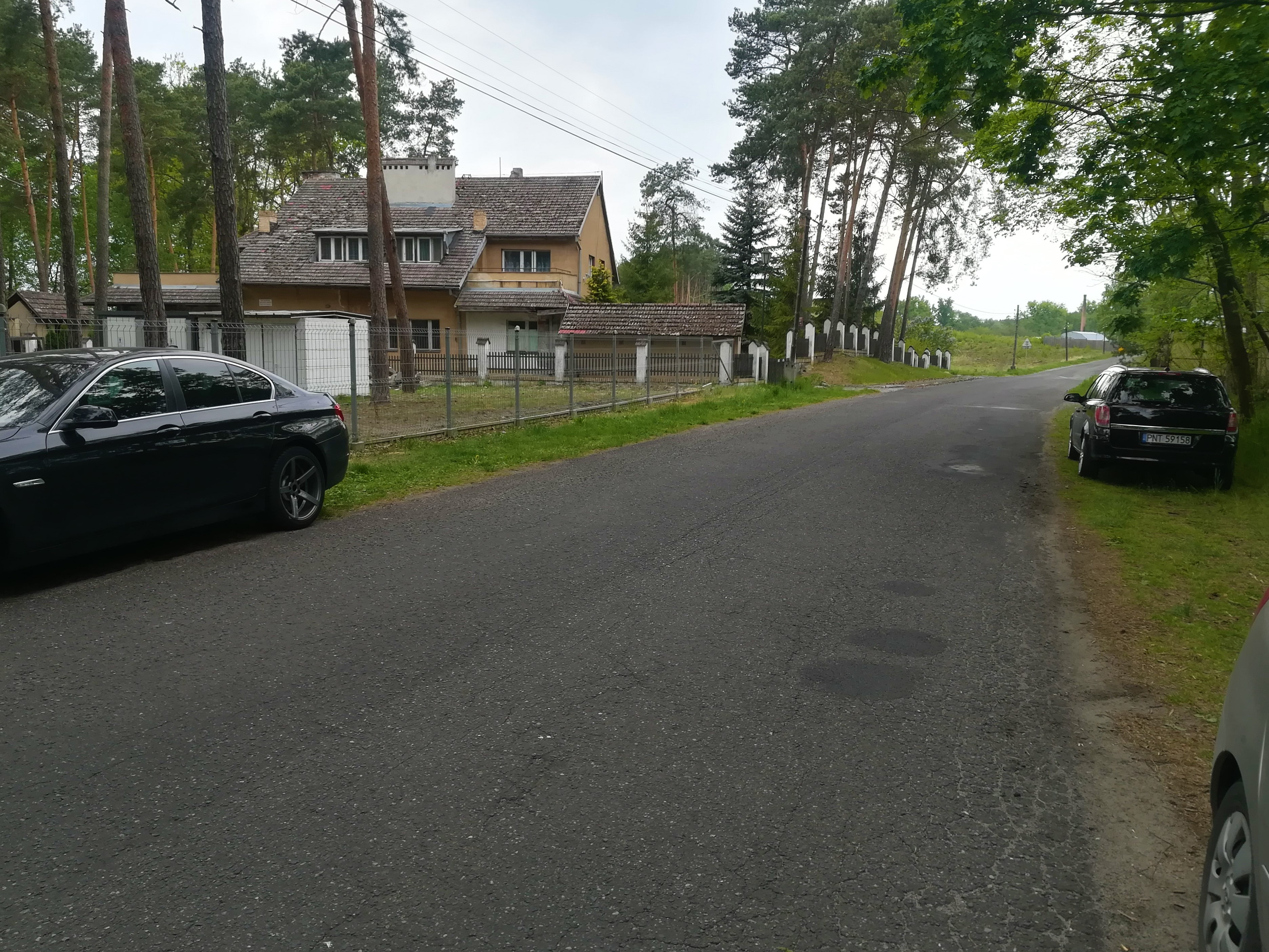

- Location within Poland
- Coordinates: 52°23′23″N 15°52′46″E
- Country: Poland
- Voivodeship: Lubusz
- County: Międzyrzecz
- Gmina: Trzciel
- Time zone: UTC+1 (CET)
  - Summer (DST): UTC+2 (CEST)
- Vehicle registration: FMI

Jabłonka [jaˈbwɔnka] is a settlement in the administrative district of Gmina Trzciel, within Międzyrzecz County, Lubusz Voivodeship, in western Poland.

Jabłonka was a private village, administratively located in the Poznań County in the Poznań Voivodeship in the Greater Poland Province of the Kingdom of Poland.
