= Rańsko =

- Village
- Location within Poland
- Coordinates: 52°26′01″N 15°43′54″E
- Country: Poland
- Voivodeship: Lubusz
- County: Międzyrzecz
- Gmina: Pszczew

Rańsko (Polish pronunciation: [ˈraj̃skɔ]) is a village in the administrative district of Gmina Pszczew, within Międzyrzecz County, Lubusz Voivodeship, in western Poland.
