= Rybojady =

- Village
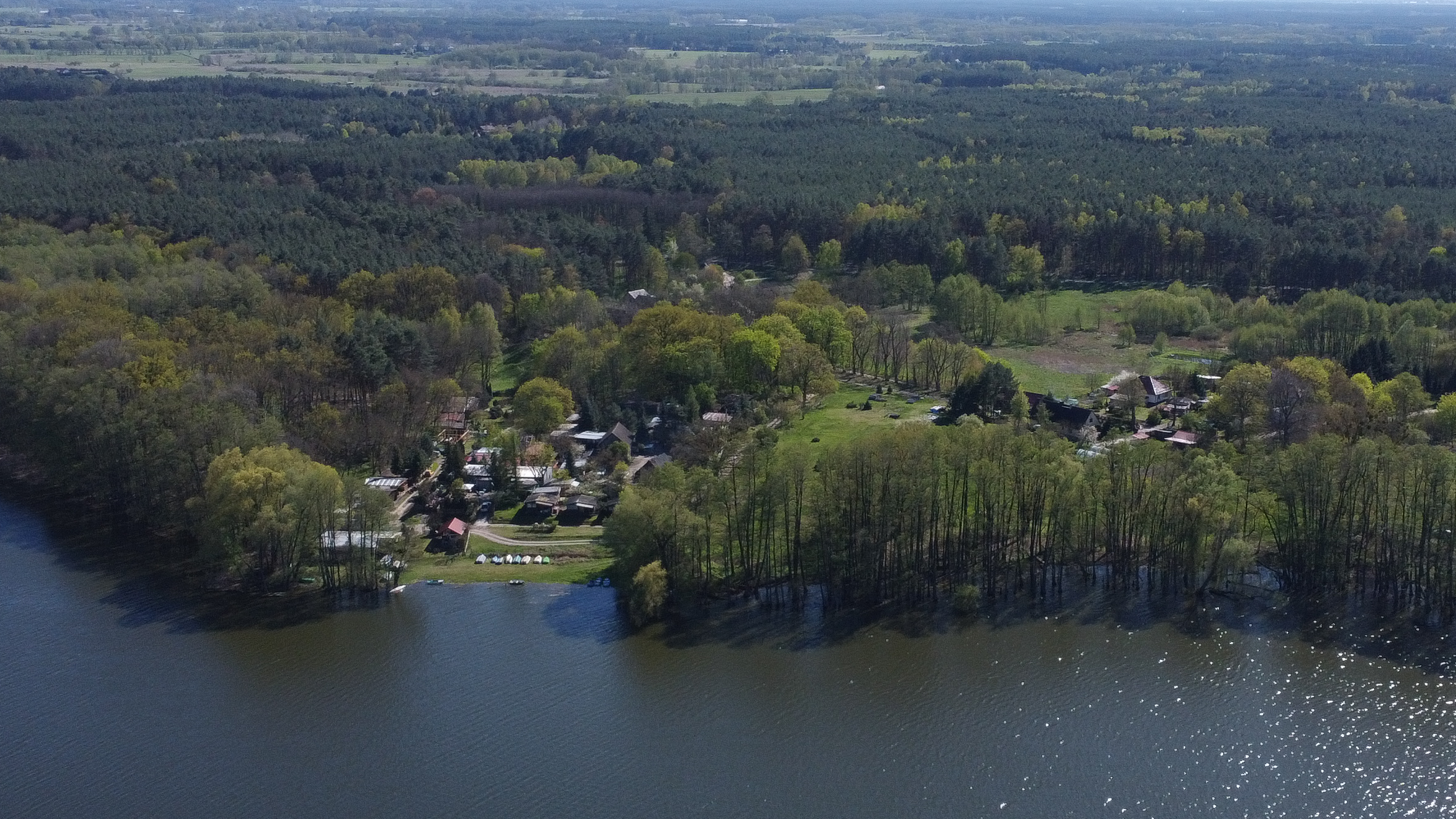

- Location within Poland
- Coordinates: 52°24′N 15°50′E
- Country: Poland
- Voivodeship: Lubusz
- County: Międzyrzecz
- Gmina: Trzciel
- Time zone: UTC+1 (CET)
  - Summer (DST): UTC+2 (CEST)
- Postal code: 66-320
- Vehicle registration: FMI

Rybojady [rɨbɔˈjadɨ] is a village in the administrative district of Gmina Trzciel, within Międzyrzecz County, Lubusz Voivodeship, in western Poland.

Rybojady was a private village, administratively located in the Poznań County in the Poznań Voivodeship in the Greater Poland Province.

Rybojady is the location of a bunker erected before World War II in 1937.
