= Lutol Mokry =

- Village
- Location within Poland
- Coordinates: 52°18′N 15°52′E
- Country: Poland
- Voivodeship: Lubusz
- County: Międzyrzecz
- Gmina: Trzciel
- Time zone: UTC+1 (CET)
  - Summer (DST): UTC+2 (CEST)
- Vehicle registration: FMI

Lutol Mokry [ˈlutɔl ˈmɔkrɨ] is a village in the administrative district of Gmina Trzciel, within Międzyrzecz County, Lubusz Voivodeship, in western Poland. It is situated on the south-western shore of Lutol Lake.

Lutol Mokry, formerly also known as Lutol Wodny, was a private church village, administratively located in the Poznań County in the Poznań Voivodeship in the Greater Poland Province of the Kingdom of Poland.
