= Gmina Trzciel =

Gmina Trzciel Trzciel Commune
- Gmina
- Coat of arms
- Interactive map of Gmina Trzciel
- Coordinates (Trzciel): 52°22′N 15°53′E
- Country: Poland
- Voivodeship: Lubusz
- County: Międzyrzecz
- Seat: Trzciel

Area
  - Total: 177.35 km^{2} (68.48 sq mi)

Population (2019-06-30)
  - Total: 6,451
  - Density: 36.37/km^{2} (94.21/sq mi)
  - Urban: 2,391
  - Rural: 4,060
- Website: www.trzciel.pl

Gmina Trzciel is an urban-rural gmina (administrative district) in Międzyrzecz County, Lubusz Voivodeship, in western Poland. Its seat is the town of Trzciel, which lies approximately 22 kilometres (14 mi) south-east of Międzyrzecz, 54 km (34 mi) north-east of Zielona Góra, and 60 km (37 mi) south-east of Gorzów Wielkopolski.

The gmina covers an area of 177.35 square kilometres (68.5 sq mi), and as of 2019 its total population is 6,451.

The gmina contains part of the protected area called Pszczew Landscape Park.

== Villages ==
Apart from the town of Trzciel, Gmina Trzciel contains the villages and settlements of Bieleń, Brójce, Chociszewo, Jabłonka, Jasieniec, Łagowiec, Lutol Mokry, Lutol Suchy, Nowy Świat, Panowice, Rybojady, Siercz, Sierczynek, Smolniki, Stary Dwór, Świdwowiec and Żydowo.

== Neighbouring gminas ==
Gmina Trzciel is bordered by the gminas of Miedzichowo, Międzyrzecz, Pszczew, Świebodzin, Szczaniec, Zbąszyń and Zbąszynek.

== Twin towns – sister cities ==
Gmina Trzciel is twinned with:

- Asendorf, Germany
- Brójce, Poland
- Falkenberg, Germany
