= Łagowiec =

- Village
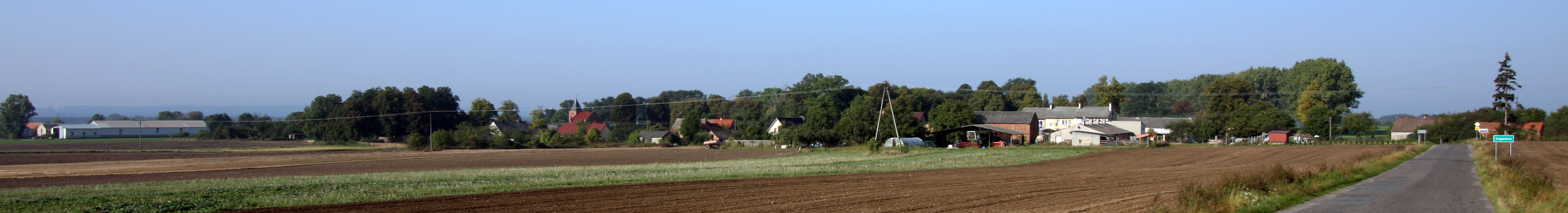

- Location within Poland
- Coordinates: 52°20′32″N 15°41′45″E
- Country: Poland
- Voivodeship: Lubusz
- County: Międzyrzecz
- Gmina: Trzciel

Łagowiec [waˈɡɔvjɛt͡s] is a village in the administrative district of Gmina Trzciel, within Międzyrzecz County, Lubusz Voivodeship, in western Poland.
