= Nowy Świat, Międzyrzecz County =

Nowy Świat
- Village
- Location within Poland
- Coordinates: 52°19′23″N 15°39′22″E
- Country: Poland
- Voivodeship: Lubusz
- County: Międzyrzecz
- Gmina: Trzciel

Nowy Świat (Polish: [ˈnɔvɨ ˈɕfjat]) is a village in the administrative district of Gmina Trzciel, within Międzyrzecz County, Lubusz Voivodeship, in western Poland.
