= Panowice =

- Village
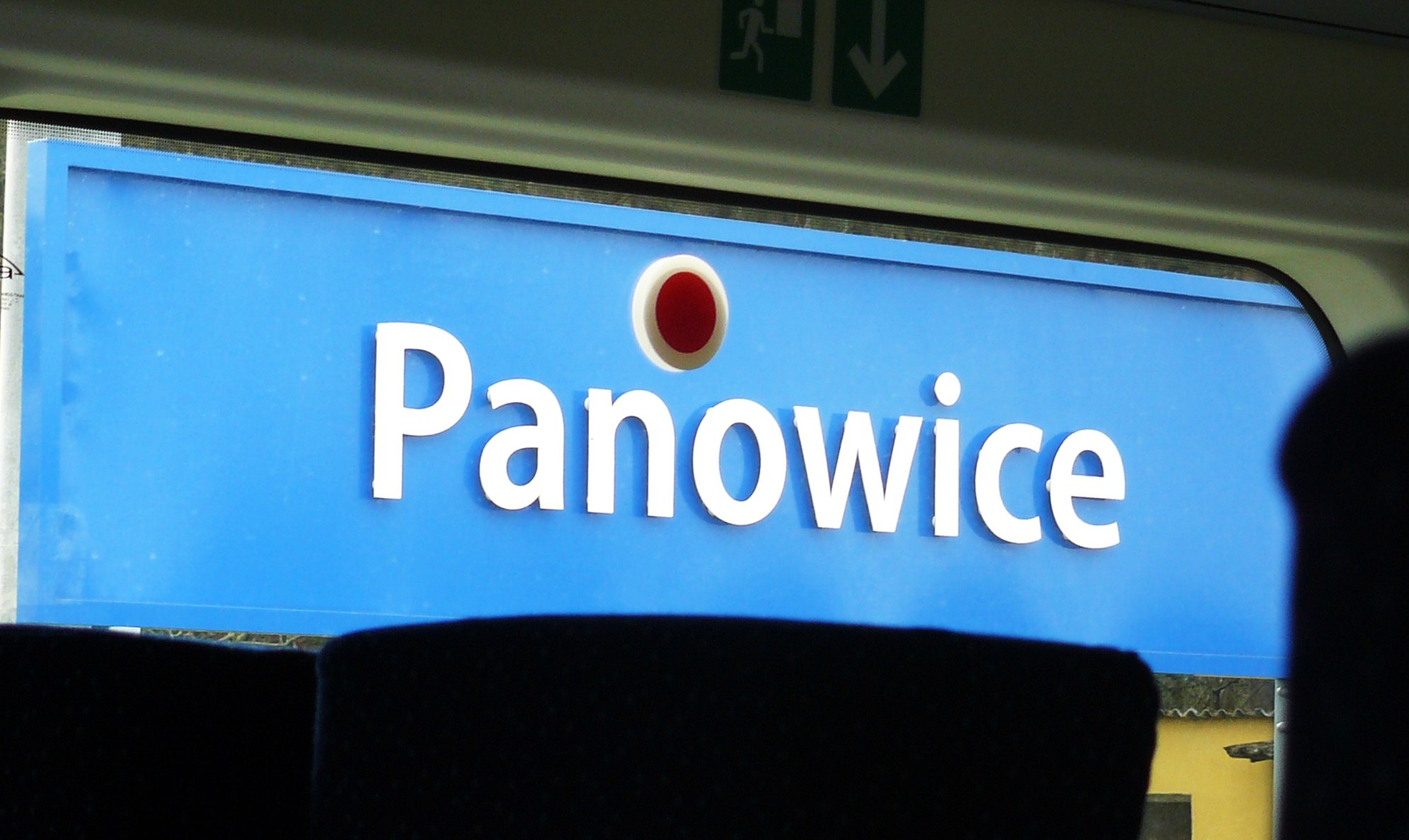

- Location within Poland
- Coordinates: 52°22′N 15°44′E
- Country: Poland
- Voivodeship: Lubusz
- County: Międzyrzecz
- Gmina: Trzciel

Panowice [panɔˈvit͡sɛ] is a village in the administrative district of Gmina Trzciel, within Międzyrzecz County, Lubusz Voivodeship, in western Poland.
