= Błotnia, Lubusz Voivodeship =

Błotnia
- Village
- Location within Poland
- Coordinates: 52°28′01″N 15°45′54″E
- Country: Poland
- Voivodeship: Lubusz
- County: Międzyrzecz
- Gmina: Pszczew

Błotnia [ˈbwɔtɲa] is a village in the administrative district of Gmina Pszczew, within Międzyrzecz County, Lubusz Voivodeship, in western Poland. Between 1975 and 1998 it belonged administratively to the province of Gdańsk.
