= Sierczynek =

- Village
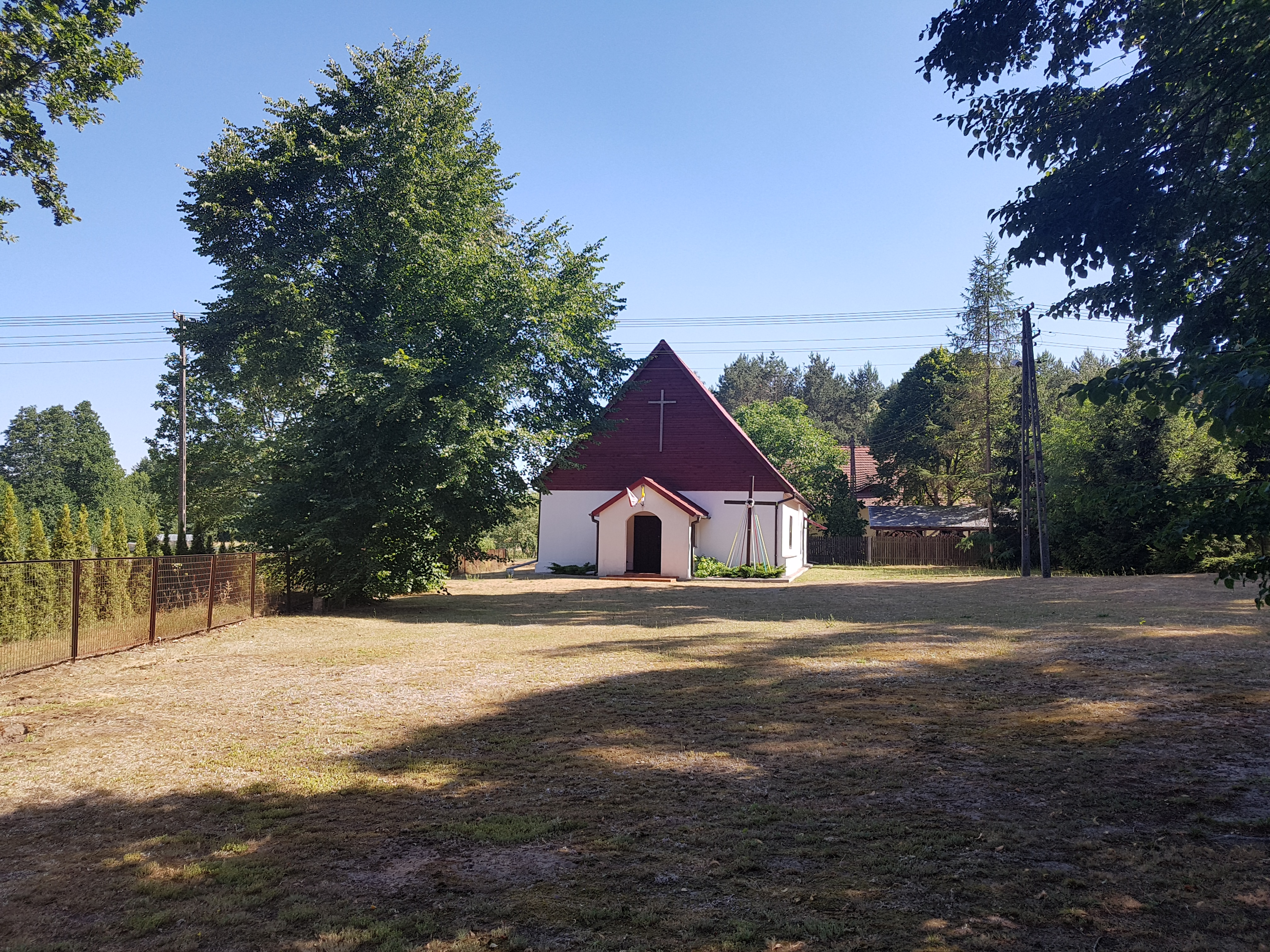

- Location within Poland
- Coordinates: 52°23′N 15°48′E
- Country: Poland
- Voivodeship: Lubusz
- County: Międzyrzecz
- Gmina: Trzciel
- Population: 262

Sierczynek [ɕɛrˈt͡ʂɨnɛk] is a village in the administrative district of Gmina Trzciel, within Międzyrzecz County, Lubusz Voivodeship, in western Poland.
