= Zielomyśl =

- Village
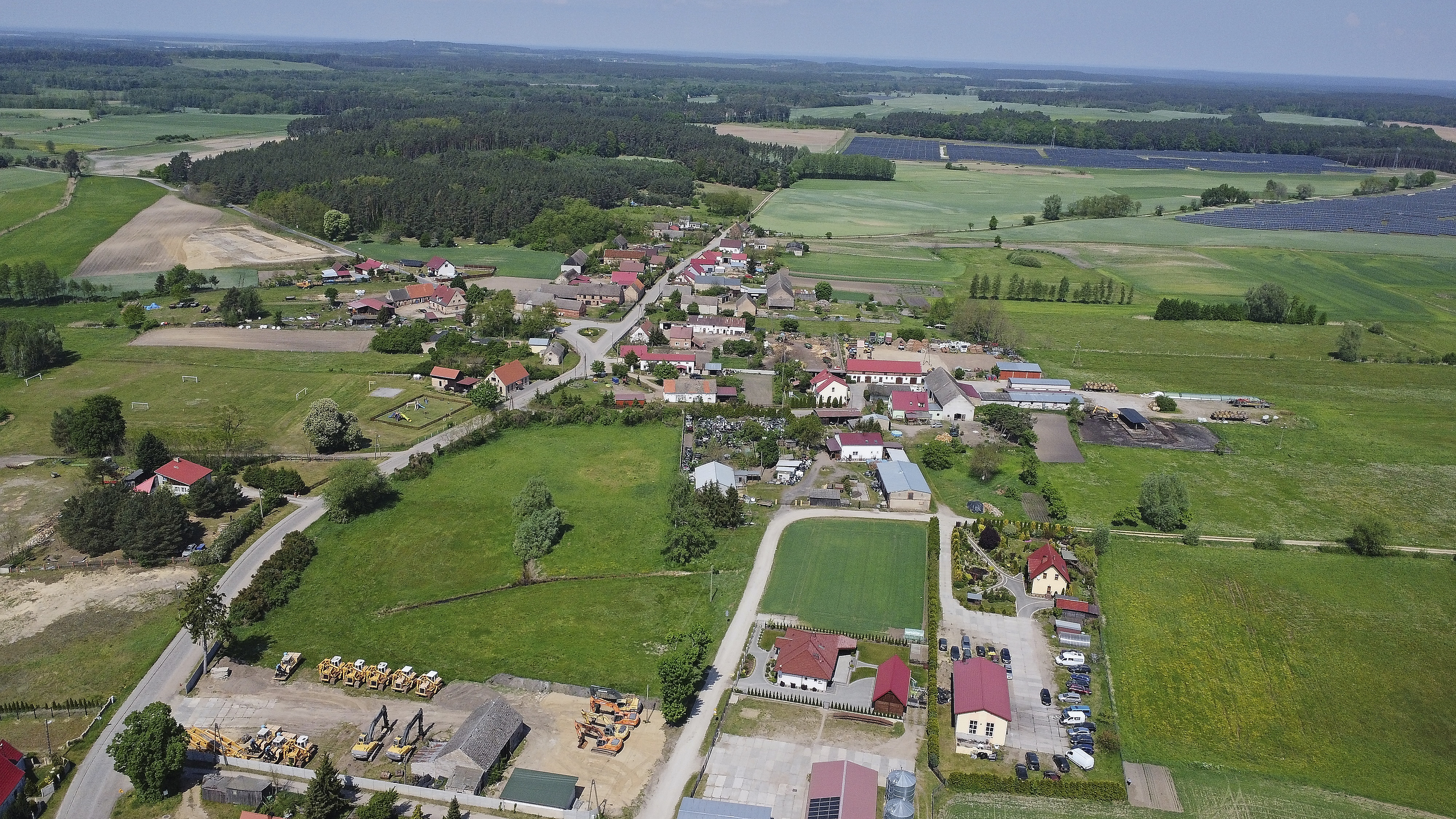
- Aerial view of Zielomyśl

- Location within Poland
- Coordinates: 52°31′38″N 15°47′29″E
- Country: Poland
- Voivodeship: Lubusz
- County: Międzyrzecz
- Gmina: Pszczew
- Time zone: UTC+1 (CET)
  - Summer (DST): UTC+2 (CEST)
- Vehicle registration: FMI

Zielomyśl [ʑɛˈlɔmɨɕl] is a village in the administrative district of Gmina Pszczew, within Międzyrzecz County, Lubusz Voivodeship, in western Poland.

Zielomyśl was a private church village, administratively located in the Poznań County in the Poznań Voivodeship in the Greater Poland Province of the Kingdom of Poland.
