= Rańsko-Leśniczówka =

- Village
- Location within Poland
- Coordinates: 52°26′39″N 15°43′36″E
- Country: Poland
- Voivodeship: Lubusz
- County: Międzyrzecz
- Gmina: Pszczew

Rańsko-Leśniczówka (Polish pronunciation: [ˈraj̃skɔ lɛɕɲiˈtʂufka] is a village in the administrative district of Gmina Pszczew, within Międzyrzecz County, Lubusz Voivodeship, in western Poland.
