= Nowe Gorzycko =

- Village
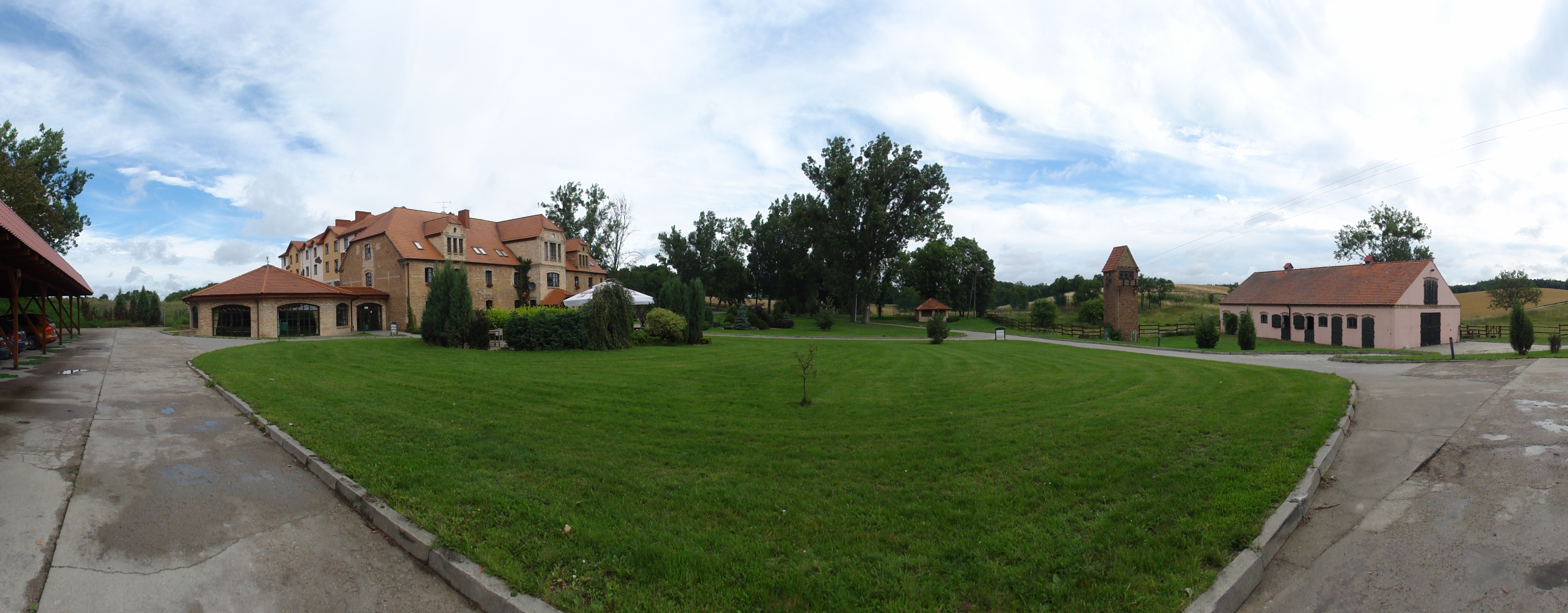

- Location within Poland
- Coordinates: 52°33′N 15°48′E
- Country: Poland
- Voivodeship: Lubusz
- County: Międzyrzecz
- Gmina: Pszczew

Nowe Gorzycko [ˈnɔvɛ ɡɔˈʐɨt͡skɔ] is a village in the administrative district of Gmina Pszczew, within Międzyrzecz County, Lubusz Voivodeship, in western Poland.
