= Świdwowiec =

- Village
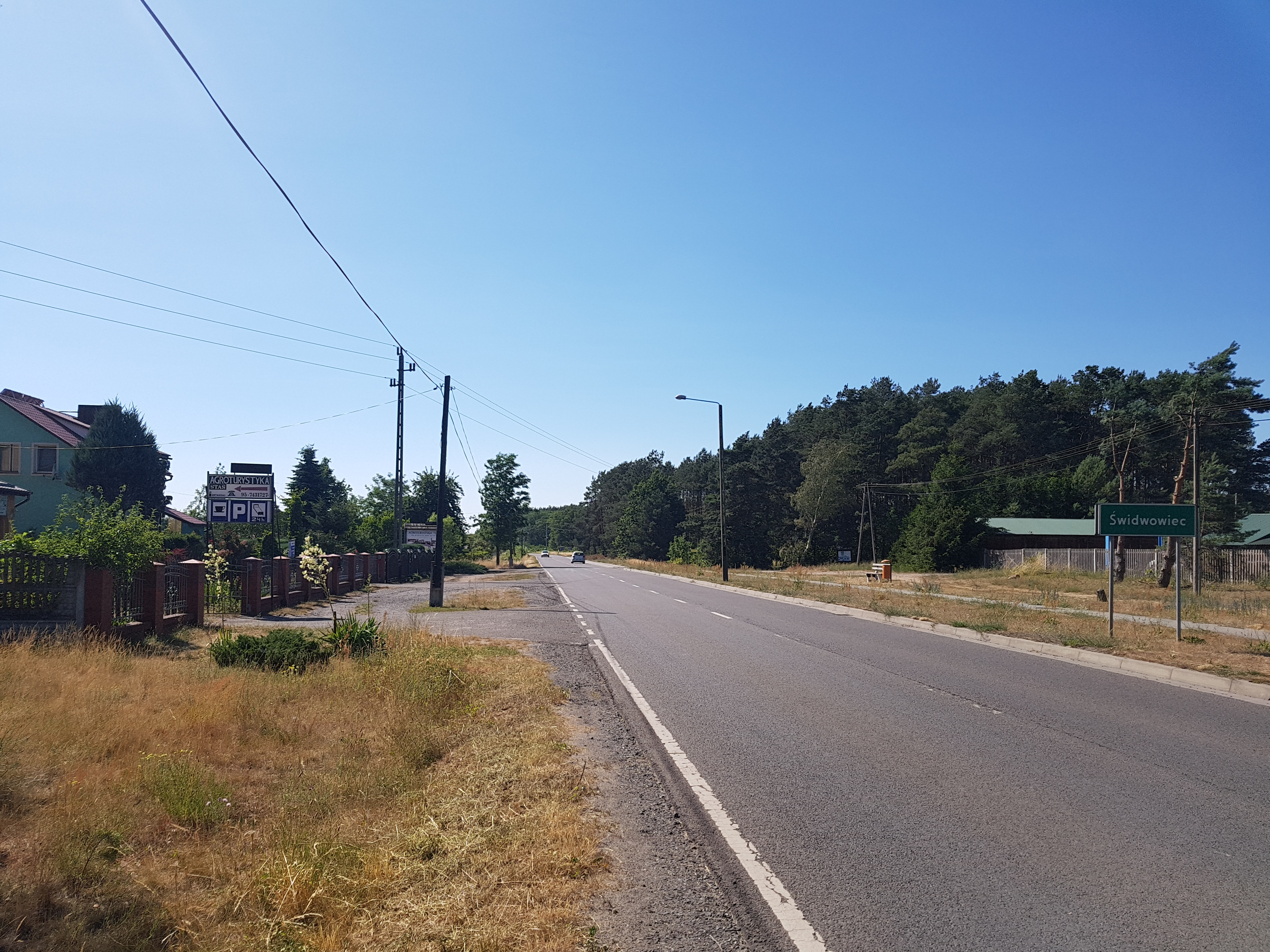

- Location within Poland
- Coordinates: 52°21′54″N 15°51′03″E
- Country: Poland
- Voivodeship: Lubusz
- County: Międzyrzecz
- Gmina: Trzciel
- Time zone: UTC+1 (CET)
  - Summer (DST): UTC+2 (CEST)
- Vehicle registration: FMI

Świdwowiec [ɕfidˈvɔvjɛt͡s] is a village in the administrative district of Gmina Trzciel, within Międzyrzecz County, Lubusz Voivodeship, in western Poland.

== History ==
Świdwowiec is a former private village of the Mielżyński noble family.

During World War II, in 1942–1943, Nazi Germany operated a forced labour camp for Jewish men in the village.
