= Jasieniec, Lubusz Voivodeship =

Jasieniec
- Village
- Location within Poland
- Coordinates: 52°21′N 15°49′E
- Country: Poland
- Voivodeship: Lubusz
- County: Międzyrzecz
- Gmina: Trzciel

Jasieniec [jaˈɕɛɲɛt͡s] is a village in the administrative district of Gmina Trzciel, within Międzyrzecz County, Lubusz Voivodeship, in western Poland.
