= Gmina Pszczew =

Gmina Pszczew Pszczew Commune
- Gmina
- Coat of arms

- Location within Poland
- Coordinates (Pszczew): 52°28′N 15°46′E
- Country: Poland
- Voivodeship: Lubusz
- County: Międzyrzecz
- Seat: Pszczew

Area
  - Total: 177.64 km^{2} (68.59 sq mi)

Population (2019-06-30)
  - Total: 4,218
  - Density: 23.74/km^{2} (61.50/sq mi)
- Website: www.pszczew.pl

Gmina Pszczew is a rural gmina (administrative district) in Międzyrzecz County, Lubusz Voivodeship, in western Poland. Its seat is the village of Pszczew, which lies approximately 13 kilometres (8 mi) east of Międzyrzecz, 46 km (29 mi) south-east of Gorzów Wielkopolski, and 62 km (39 mi) north of Zielona Góra.

The gmina covers an area of 177.64 square kilometres (68.6 sq mi), and as of 2019 its total population is 4,218.

The gmina contains part of the protected area called Pszczew Landscape Park.

== Villages ==
Gmina Pszczew contains the villages and settlements of Biercza, Błotnia, Borowy Młyn, Brzeźno, Janowo, Nowe Gorzycko, Policko, Pszczew, Rańsko, Rańsko-Leśniczówka, Silna, Stoki, Stołuń, Świechocin, Szarcz, Wrony and Zielomyśl.

== Neighbouring gminas ==
Gmina Pszczew is bordered by the gminas of Miedzichowo, Międzychód, Międzyrzecz, Przytoczna and Trzciel.

== Twin towns – sister cities ==
Gmina Pszczew is twinned with:

- Canaro, Italy
- Letschin, Germany
