= Pszczew Landscape Park =

Protected area in western Poland

- Pszczewski Park Krajobrazowy
- IUCN category V (protected landscape/seascape)
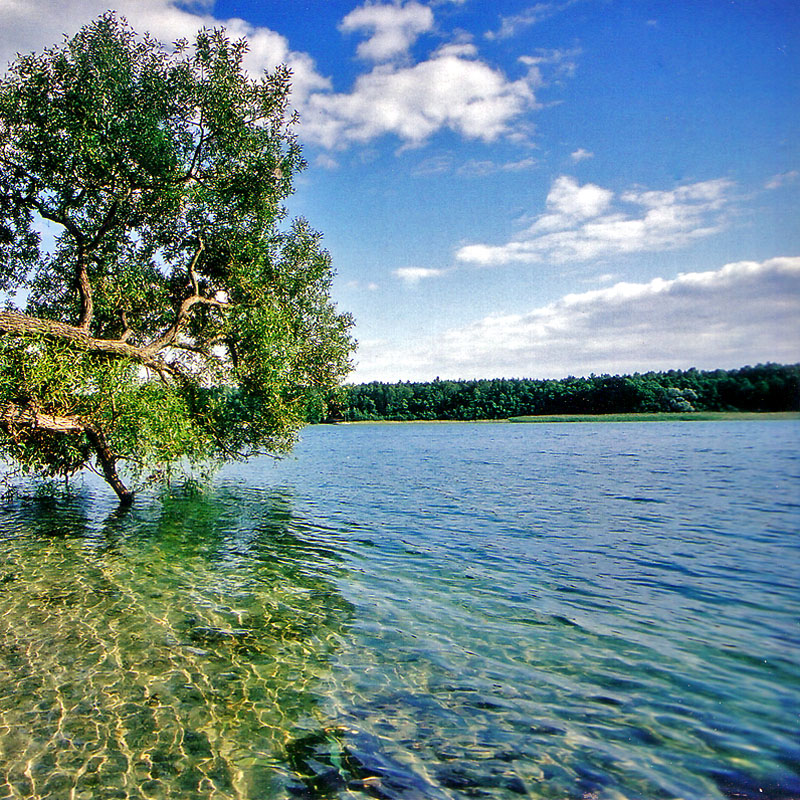
- Lubikowskie Lake
- Interactive map of Pszczew Landscape Park
- Location: east Poland
- Coordinates: 52°28′N 15°49′E
- Area: 122.20 km^{2} (47.18 sq mi)
- Established: 1986

Pszczew Landscape Park (Polish: Pszczewski Park Krajobrazowy) is a protected area (Landscape Park) in western Poland, established in 1986, covering an area of 122.20 square kilometres (47.18 sq mi). It takes its name from the village of Pszczew.

The Park is shared between two voivodeships: Lubusz Voivodeship and Greater Poland Voivodeship. Within Lubusz Voivodeship it lies in Międzyrzecz County (Gmina Międzyrzecz, Gmina Przytoczna, Gmina Pszczew, Gmina Trzciel). Within Greater Poland Voivodeship it lies in Międzychód County (Gmina Międzychód) and Nowy Tomyśl County (Gmina Miedzichowo).

Within the Landscape Park are four nature reserves.
