= Silna =

- Village
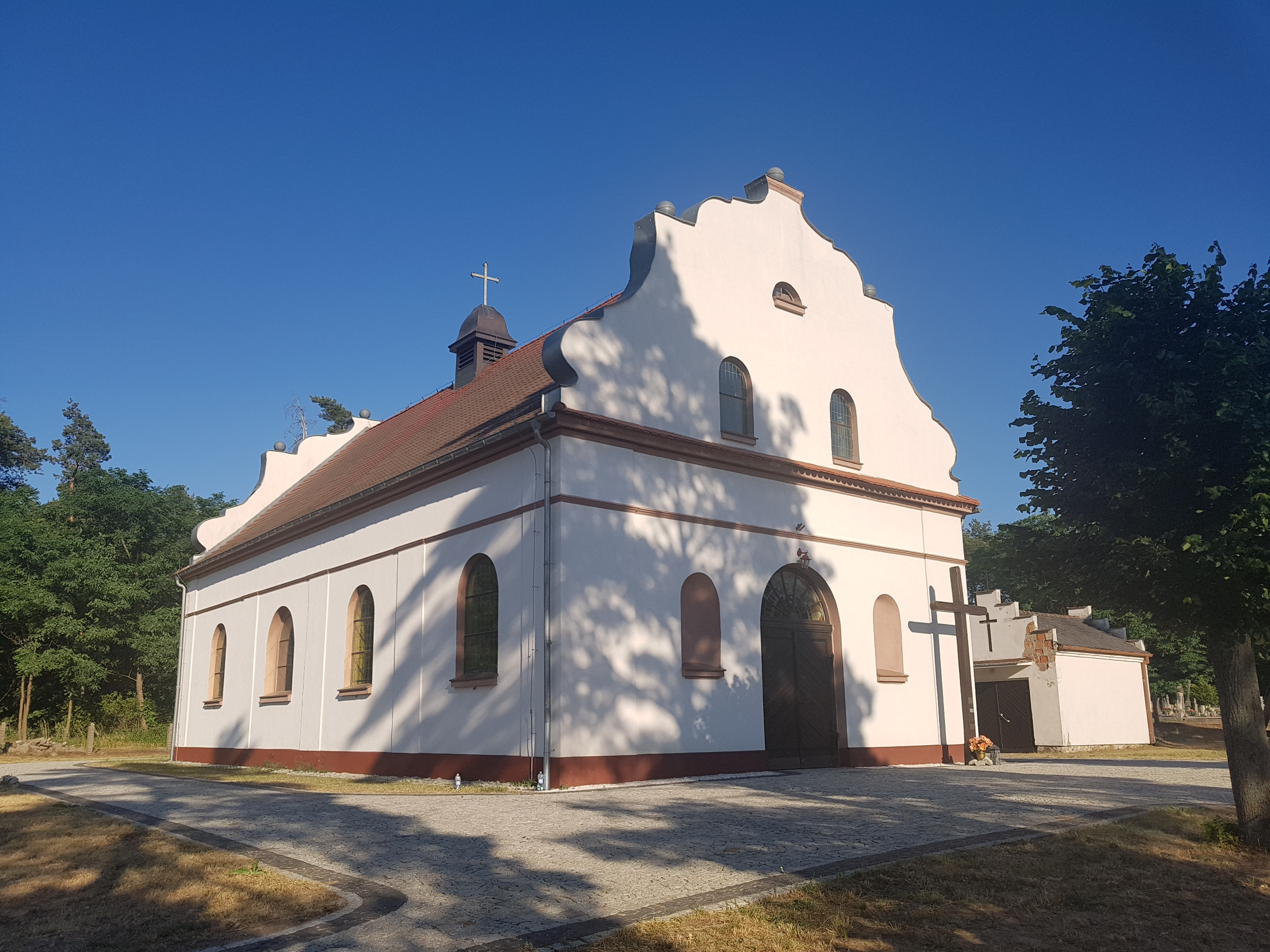
- Church of Saint Joseph

- Location within Poland
- Coordinates: 52°28′N 15°51′E
- Country: Poland
- Voivodeship: Lubusz
- County: Międzyrzecz
- Gmina: Pszczew
- Time zone: UTC+1 (CET)
  - Summer (DST): UTC+2 (CEST)
- Vehicle registration: FMI

Silna [ˈɕilna] is a village in the administrative district of Gmina Pszczew, within Międzyrzecz County, Lubusz Voivodeship, in western Poland.

Silna was a private church village, administratively located in the Poznań County in the Poznań Voivodeship in the Greater Poland Province of the Kingdom of Poland.
