= Silný =

Silný (feminine: Silná) is a Czech surname meaning "strong". Notable people with the surname include:

- Barbora Silná (born 1989), Czech-Austrian ice dancer
- Jan Silný (born 1995), Czech footballer
- Josef Silný (1902–1981), Czech football player
- Libuše Silný (born 1937), Czechoslovak speed skater
