= Stary Dwór, Lubusz Voivodeship =

Stary Dwór
- Village
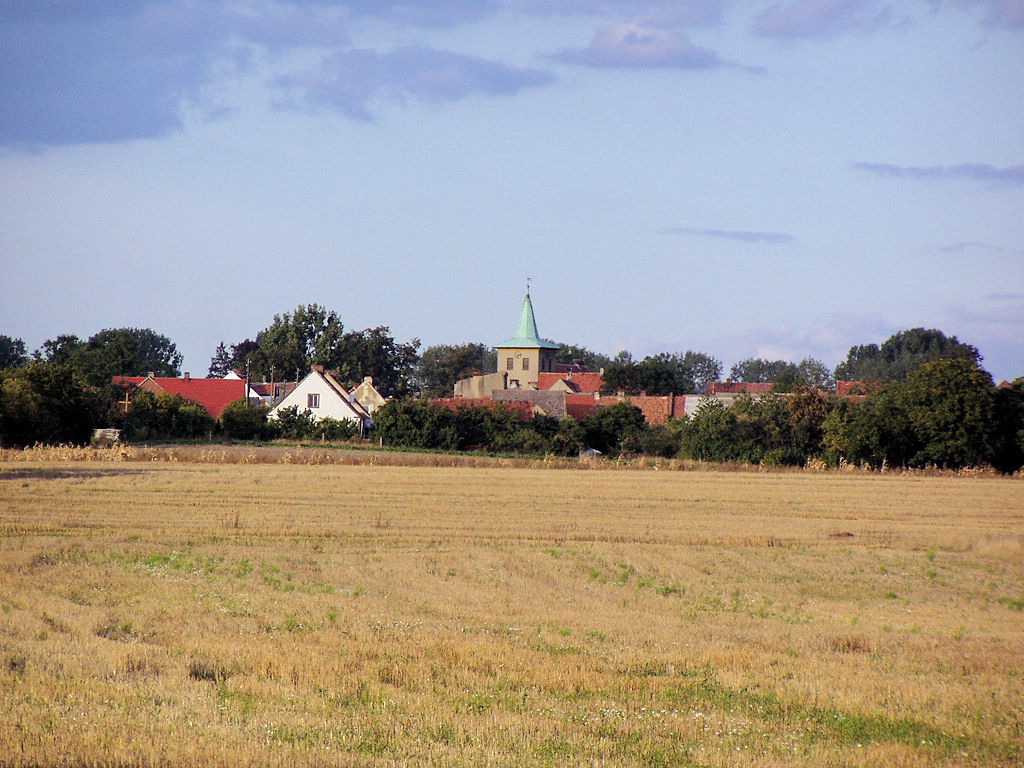

- Location within Poland
- Coordinates: 52°20′N 15°40′E
- Country: Poland
- Voivodeship: Lubusz
- County: Międzyrzecz
- Gmina: Trzciel
- Elevation: 95 m (312 ft)

Population
  - Total: 360
- Time zone: UTC+1 (CET)
  - Summer (DST): UTC+2 (CEST)
- Vehicle registration: FMI

Stary Dwór [ˈstarɨ ˈdvur] is a village in the administrative district of Gmina Trzciel, within Międzyrzecz County, Lubusz Voivodeship, in western Poland.

Stary Dwór was a private church village, administratively located in the Poznań County in the Poznań Voivodeship in the Greater Poland Province of the Kingdom of Poland.
