= Guz (surname) =

Guz or Huz (Cyrillic: Гуз or Гузь) is a surname that is common in Poland, Belarus, Ukraine, and Russia. It is often transliterated as Huz from Belarusian and Ukrainian.

Notable people with the surname include:

- Aleksandr Guz (born 2004), Belarusian footballer
- Dmitry Guz (born 1988), Russian footballer
- Grigori Guz (born 1985), Russian footballer
- Ihor Huz (born 1982), Ukrainian politician
- Innocent Guz (1890–1940), Polish Franciscan priest
- Paulina Guz (born 1991), Polish cyclist
- Samuil Guz (1905–1969), Soviet metallurgist
- Savannah Schroll Guz (born 1974), American author and artist
- Viktor Guz (born 1971), Russian football coach and player
