= Gaj =

Gaj or GAJ may refer to:

== Places ==
=== Croatia ===
- Gaj, Požega-Slavonia County, a village near Lipik
- Gaj, Zagreb County, a village near Vrbovec

=== Bosnia and Herzegovina ===
- Gaj (Goražde)
- Gaj (Gornji Vakuf)
- Gaj (Kiseljak)
- Gaj (Nevesinje)
- Gaj (Srebrenica)

=== Poland ===
- Gaj, Golub-Dobrzyń County in Kuyavian-Pomeranian Voivodeship (north-central Poland)
- Gaj, Mogilno County in Kuyavian-Pomeranian Voivodeship (north-central Poland)
- Gaj, Łęczyca County in Łódź Voivodeship (central Poland)
- Gaj, Łowicz County in Łódź Voivodeship (central Poland)
- Gaj, Brzeziny County in Łódź Voivodeship (central Poland)
- Gaj, Radomsko County in Łódź Voivodeship (central Poland)
- Gaj, Rawa County in Łódź Voivodeship (central Poland)
- Gaj, Gmina Czerniewice, Tomaszów County in Łódź Voivodeship (central Poland)
- Gaj, Bielsk County in Podlaskie Voivodeship (north-east Poland)
- Gaj, Przysucha County in Masovian Voivodeship (east-central Poland)
- Gaj, Pułtusk County in Masovian Voivodeship (east-central Poland)
- Gaj, Sochaczew County in Masovian Voivodeship (east-central Poland)
- Gaj, Wyszków County in Masovian Voivodeship (east-central Poland)
- Gaj, Gniezno County in Greater Poland Voivodeship (west-central Poland)
- Gaj, Gostyń County in Greater Poland Voivodeship (west-central Poland)
- Gaj, Koło County in Greater Poland Voivodeship (west-central Poland)
- Gaj, Konin County in Greater Poland Voivodeship (west-central Poland)
- Gaj, Śrem County in Greater Poland Voivodeship (west-central Poland)
- Gaj, Lubusz Voivodeship (west Poland)
- Gaj, Pomeranian Voivodeship (north Poland)
- Gaj, Bartoszyce County in Warmian-Masurian Voivodeship (north Poland)
- Gaj, Nowe Miasto County in Warmian-Masurian Voivodeship (north Poland)
- Gaj, Gmina Barczewo in Warmian-Masurian Voivodeship (north Poland)
- Gaj, Gmina Olsztynek in Warmian-Masurian Voivodeship (north Poland)
- Gaj, Wrocław in Wrocław (south-western Poland)

=== Serbia ===
- Gaj, Belgrade, a suburban neighborhood of Belgrade in the Municipality of Voždovac
- Gaj (Barajevo), a suburban neighborhood of Belgrade in the Municipality of Barajevo
- Gaj (Kovin), a village near Kovin
- Veliki Gaj, a village in Plandište municipality (Vojvodina)

=== Slovenia ===
- Gaj, Brežice
- Gaj, Slovenska Bistrica
- Gaj, Šmarje pri Jelšah

== People ==
Surname

- Ljudevit Gaj (1809-1872), Croatian linguist, politician, journalist and writer, inventor of Gaj's Latin alphabet

Given name

- Gaj Singh (born 1948), Indian politician
- Gaj Singh of Marwar (1595-1638), Raja of Marwar Kingdom (in modern India)

Other names

- Gary Ablett Jr., Australian footballer known by the nickname "GAJ"

== Other uses ==
- Gadsup language
- Gaj language
- Gaj (Dungeons & Dragons), a fictional creature in the Dungeons & Dragons role-playing game
- Guz, a unit of length used in parts of Asia
- INS Gaj (2002), a tugboat of the Indian Navy
- Yamagata Airport, in Japan
- Good Ass Job, a scrapped album by Kanye West

== See also ==
- Gaja (disambiguation)
- Guz (disambiguation)
