= Huz =

Huz or HUZ may refer to:

- Huizhou Pingtan Airport, in Guangdong, China
- Hunzib language, spoken in Dagestan, Russia
- Ihor Huz (born 1982), Ukrainian politician
