= Chełmsko =

Chełmsko may refer to the following places in Poland:

- Chełmsko, Lubusz Voivodeship
- Chełmsko, West Pomeranian Voivodeship
- Chełmsko Śląskie
