= Guz (disambiguation) =

Guz or gaj, also known as the Mughal yard, is a traditional Indian unit of length.

Guz or GUZ may also refer to:

== People ==
- Guz (surname)
- Guz Khan (born 1986), English comedian

== Other uses ==
- Gat railway station, in Pakistan
- Gusii language, Bantu language of Kenya
- HMNB Devonport, a Royal Navy base

== See also ==
- Gaj (disambiguation)
