= Żabno, Lubusz Voivodeship =

Żabno
- Settlement
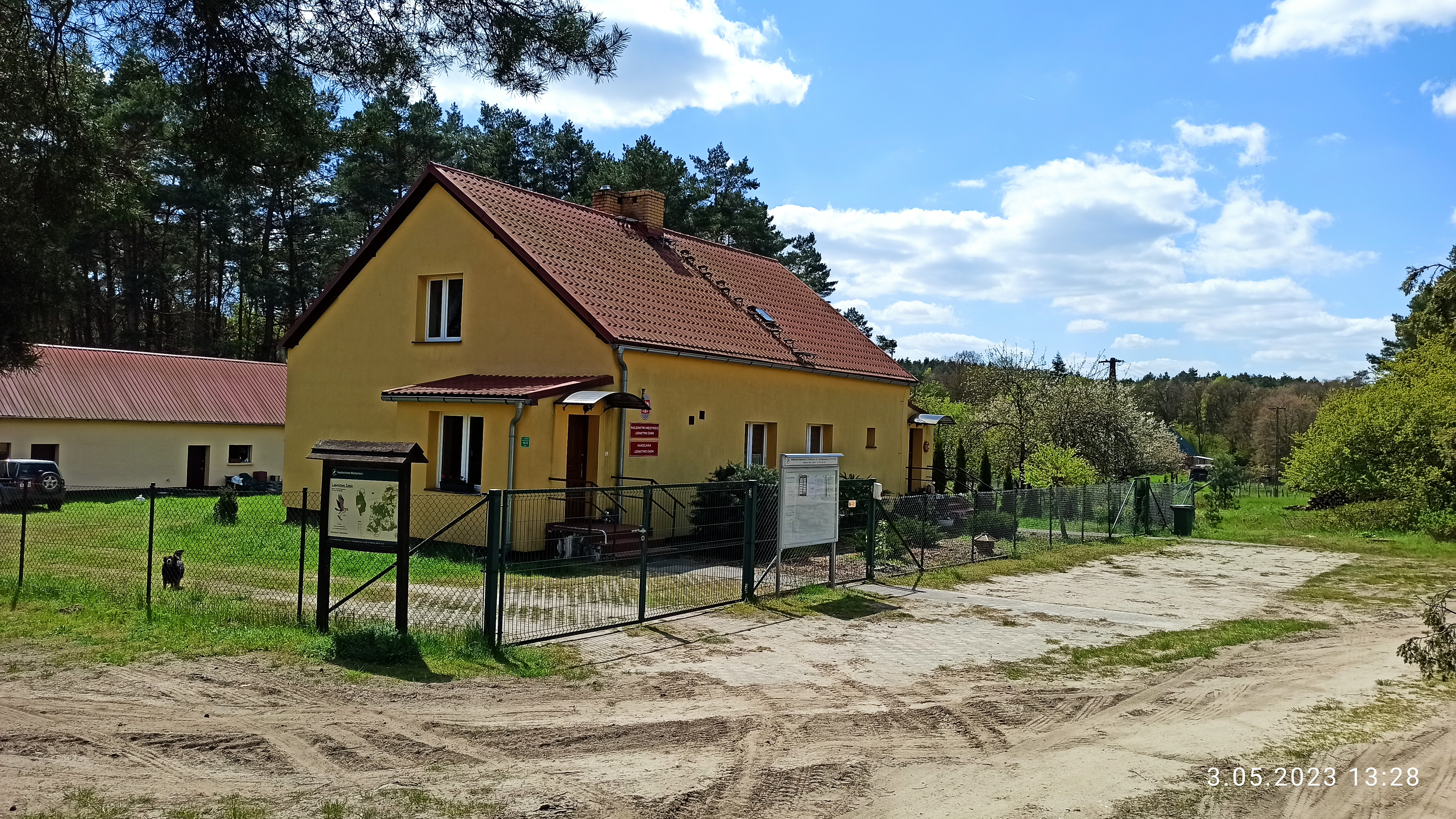

- Location within Poland
- Coordinates: 52°33′28″N 15°33′33″E
- Country: Poland
- Voivodeship: Lubusz
- County: Międzyrzecz
- Gmina: Przytoczna

Żabno [ˈʐabnɔ] is a settlement in the administrative district of Gmina Przytoczna, within Międzyrzecz County, Lubusz Voivodeship, in western Poland.
