= Lubikówko =

Settlement in Gmina Przytoczna, Poland

- Settlement
- Location within Poland
- Coordinates: 52°32′15″N 15°40′42″E
- Country: Poland
- Voivodeship: Lubusz
- County: Międzyrzecz
- Gmina: Przytoczna

Lubikówko [lubiˈkufkɔ] is a settlement in the administrative district of Gmina Przytoczna, within Międzyrzecz County, Lubusz Voivodeship, in western Poland.
