= Wierzbno, Lubusz Voivodeship =

Wierzbno
- Village
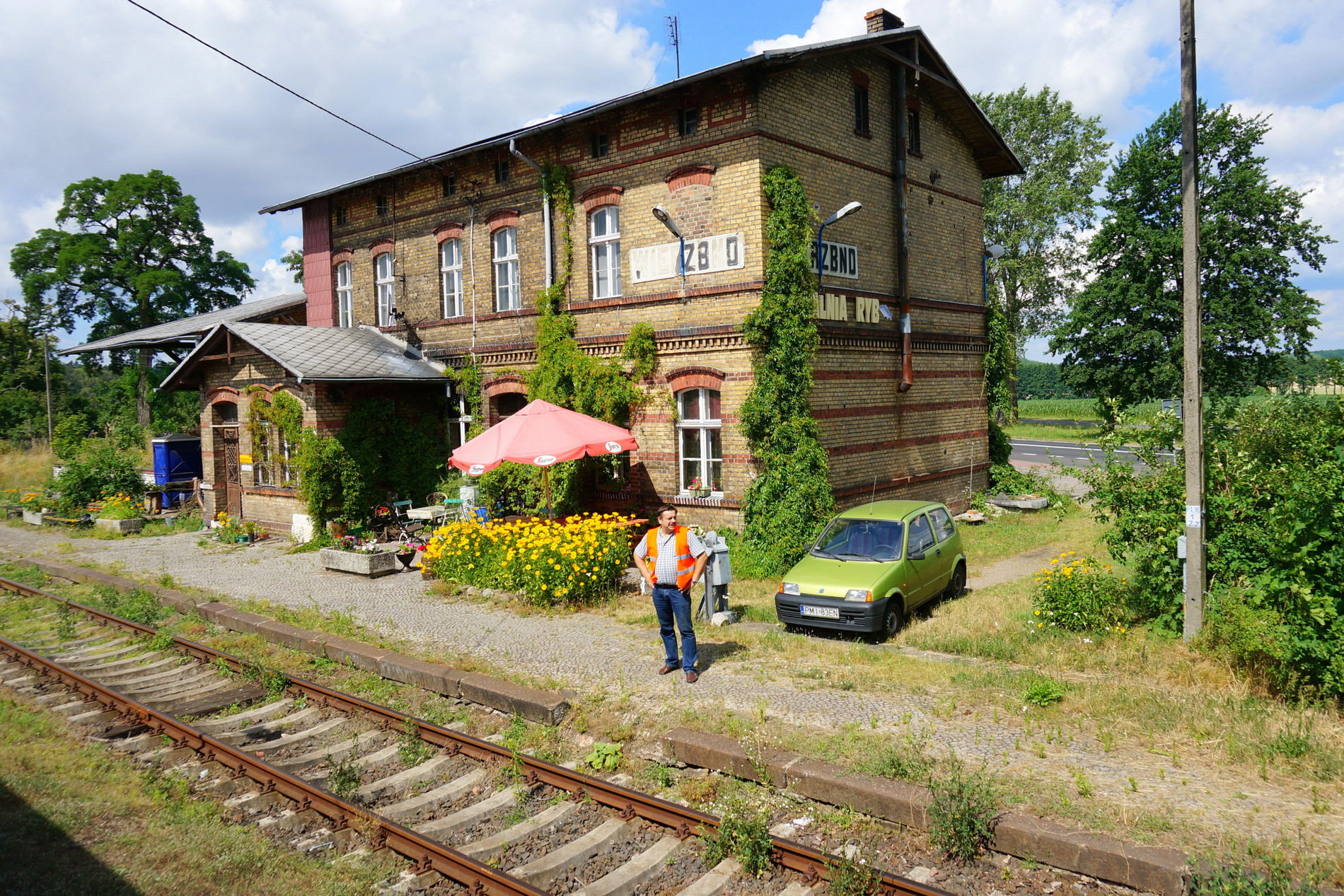
- Railway station

- Location within Poland
- Coordinates: 52°34′8″N 15°48′9″E
- Country: Poland
- Voivodeship: Lubusz
- County: Międzyrzecz
- Gmina: Przytoczna

Wierzbno [ˈvjɛʐbnɔ] is a village in the administrative district of Gmina Przytoczna, within Międzyrzecz County, Lubusz Voivodeship, in western Poland.
