= Gmina Przytoczna =

Gmina Przytoczna Przytoczna Commune
- Gmina
- Coat of arms

- Location within Poland
- Coordinates (Przytoczna): 52°34′N 15°40′E
- Country: Poland
- Voivodeship: Lubusz
- County: Międzyrzecz
- Seat: Przytoczna

Area
  - Total: 184.5 km^{2} (71.2 sq mi)

Population (2019-06-30)
  - Total: 5,618
  - Density: 30.45/km^{2} (78.86/sq mi)
- Website: www.przytoczna.pl

Gmina Przytoczna is a rural gmina (administrative district) in Międzyrzecz County, Lubusz Voivodeship, in western Poland. Its seat is the village of Przytoczna, which lies approximately 15 kilometres (9 mi) north of Międzyrzecz, 34 km (21 mi) south-east of Gorzów Wielkopolski, and 71 km (44 mi) north of Zielona Góra.

The gmina covers an area of 184.5 square kilometres (71.2 sq mi), and as of 2019 its total population is 5,618.

The gmina contains part of the protected area called Pszczew Landscape Park.

== Villages ==
Gmina Przytoczna contains the villages and settlements of Chełmicko, Chełmsko, Dębówko, Dziubielewo, Gaj, Goraj, Krasne Dłusko, Krobielewo, Lubikówko, Lubikowo, Murowiec, Nowa Niedrzwica, Nowiny, Orłowce, Poręba, Przytoczna, Rokitno, Strychy, Stryszewo, Twierdzielewo, Wierzbno and Żabno.

== Neighbouring gminas ==
Gmina Przytoczna is bordered by the gminas of Bledzew, Międzychód, Międzyrzecz, Pszczew and Skwierzyna.

== Twin towns – sister cities ==
Gmina Przytoczna is twinned with:

- Wusterhausen, Germany
