= Rokitno, Międzyrzecz County =

Rokitno
- Village
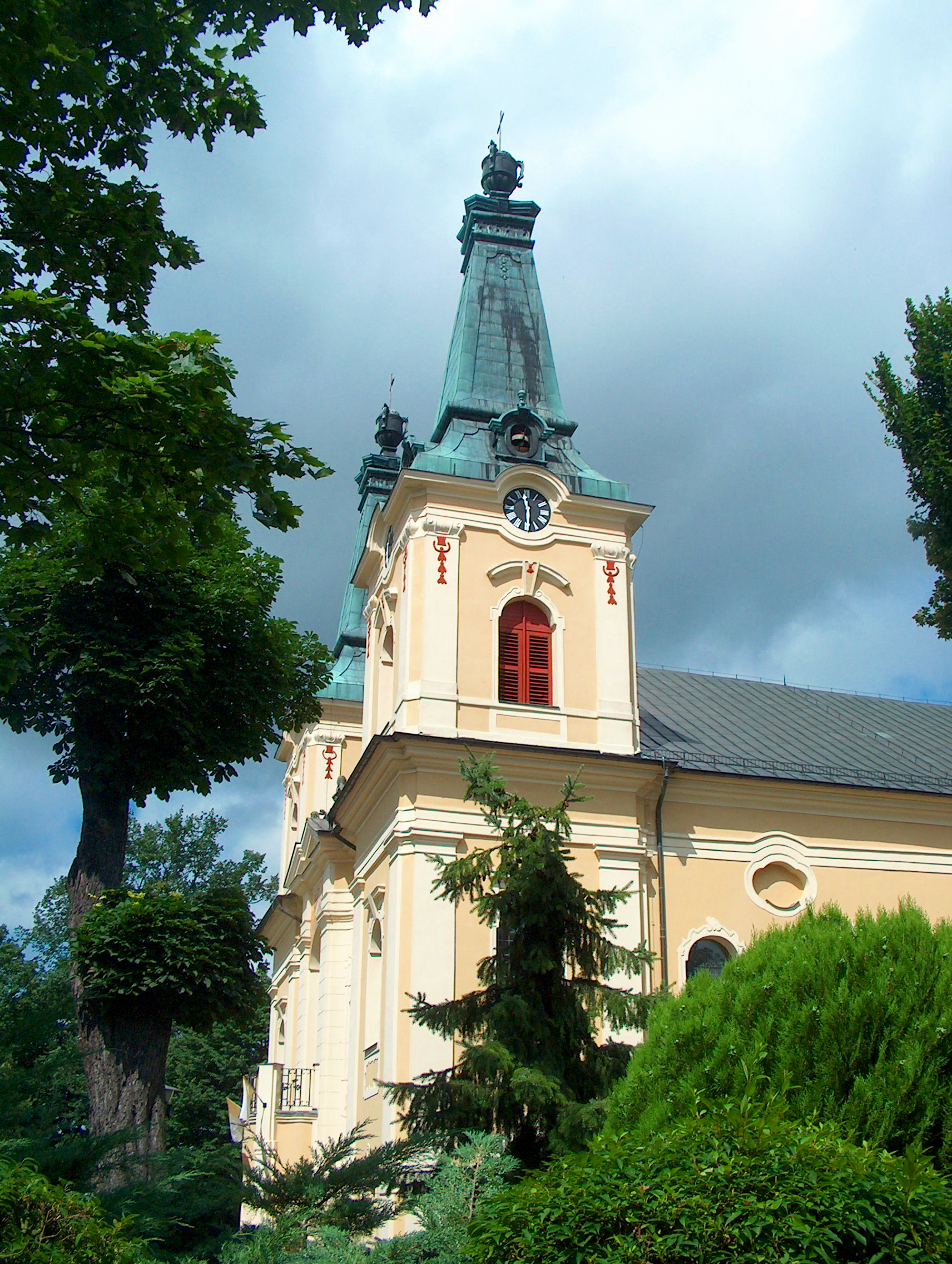
- Baroque Sanctuary of Our Lady of Rokitno

- Location within Poland
- Coordinates: 52°33′N 15°39′E
- Country: Poland
- Voivodeship: Lubusz
- County: Międzyrzecz
- Gmina: Przytoczna
- First mentioned: 1378

Population
  - Total: 470
- Time zone: UTC+1 (CET)
  - Summer (DST): UTC+2 (CEST)
- Vehicle registration: FMI

Rokitno [rɔˈkitnɔ] is a village in the administrative district of Gmina Przytoczna, within Międzyrzecz County, Lubusz Voivodeship, in western Poland.

The local landmark is the Baroque Sanctuary of Our Lady of Rokitno, a Historic Monument of Poland.
