= Orłowce, Lubusz Voivodeship =

Orłowce
- Village
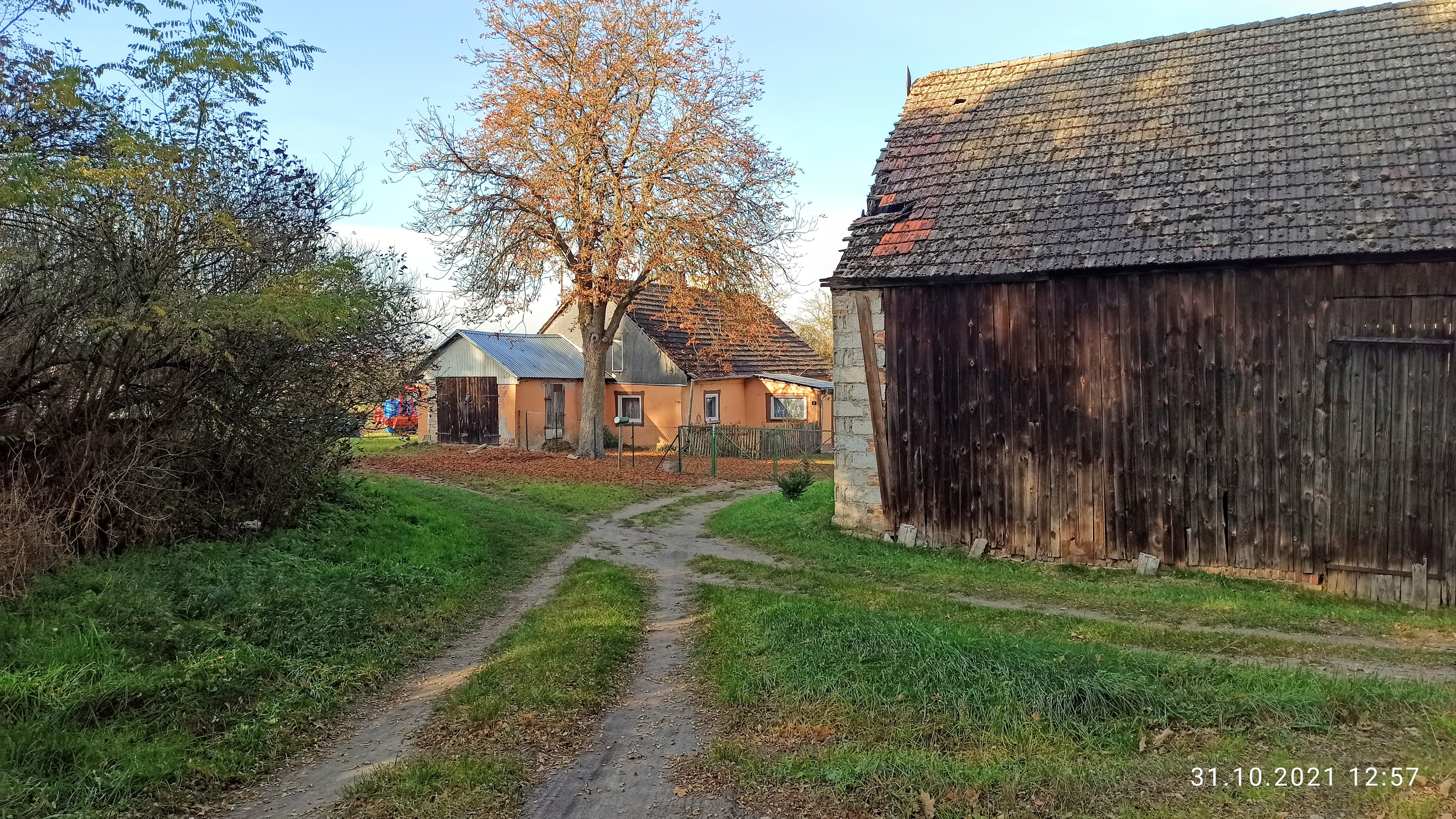

- Location within Poland
- Coordinates: 52°36′59″N 15°43′41″E
- Country: Poland
- Voivodeship: Lubusz
- County: Międzyrzecz
- Gmina: Przytoczna

Orłowce [ɔrˈwɔft͡sɛ] is a village in the administrative district of Gmina Przytoczna, in Międzyrzecz County, Lubusz Voivodeship, in western Poland.
