= Dziubielewo =

- Settlement
- Location within Poland
- Coordinates: 52°31′32″N 15°42′59″E
- Country: Poland
- Voivodeship: Lubusz
- County: Międzyrzecz
- Gmina: Przytoczna

Dziubielewo [d͡ʑubjɛˈlɛvɔ] is a settlement in the administrative district of Gmina Przytoczna, within Międzyrzecz County, Lubusz Voivodeship, in western Poland.
