= Dębówko, Lubusz Voivodeship =

Dębówko
- Village
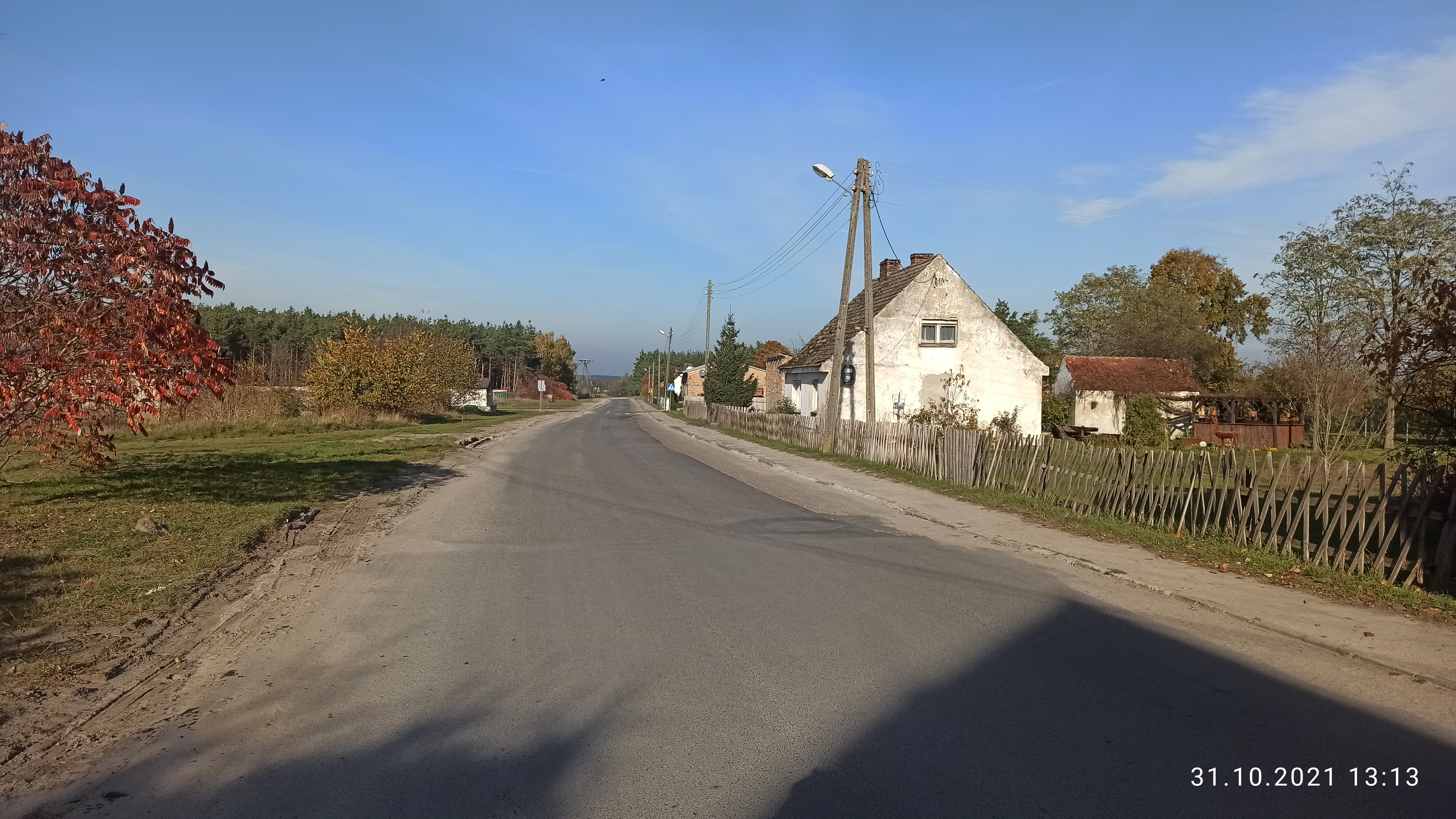

- Location within Poland
- Coordinates: 52°36′0″N 15°41′20″E
- Country: Poland
- Voivodeship: Lubusz
- County: Międzyrzecz
- Gmina: Przytoczna

Dębówko [dɛmˈbufkɔ] is a village in the administrative district of Gmina Przytoczna, within Międzyrzecz County, Lubusz Voivodeship, in western Poland.
