= Prize of the Cabinet of Ministers of Ukraine for Special Achievements of Youth in the Development of Ukraine =

Ukrainian government award

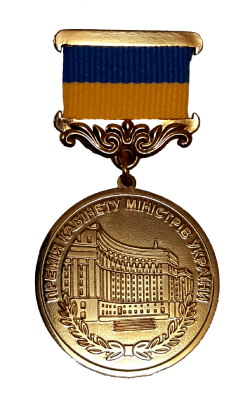
Prize of the Cabinet of Ministers of Ukraine for Special Achievements of Youth in the Development of Ukraine

The Prize of the Cabinet of Ministers of Ukraine for Special Achievements of Youth in Development of Ukraine is a government award established in 1999 by the Cabinet of Ministers of Ukraine to celebrate significant achievements of youth in various spheres of public life, and to encourage youth to participate in public life.

Initially, it was called the Prize of the Cabinet of Ministers of Ukraine for Significant Achievements of Young People in Various Spheres of Public Life. In 2000 it was renamed the Prize of the Cabinet of Ministers of Ukraine for Special Achievements in Youth in the Development of Ukraine.

The prize is awarded to persons under the age of 35 for achievements in the development of Ukraine during the calendar year preceding its award and may also take into account the achievements of the candidate for the award in previous years.

Every year the list of laureates is approved by the Cabinet of Ministers by its order, each laureate is awarded a diploma, a badge, and a monetary reward is paid. Up to 20 prizes in the amount of ₴50,000 each are awarded annually.

== Notable laureates ==
- Viktor Bankin
- Olena Bilosiuk
- Anastasia Dmitruk
- Ihor Huz
- Olha Kharlan
- Alina Komashchuk
- Pavlo Korostylov
- Ruslan Martsinkiv
- Yaryna Matlo
- Anastasiya Merkushyna
- Ruslan Riaboshapka
- Mykhailo Romanchuk
- Olha Saladukha
- Valentyna Semerenko
- Vita Semerenko
- Ruslan Stefanchuk
- Olga Sviderska
- Oleksandr Vorobiov
