= Ruslan Martsinkiv =

Ukrainian politician (born 1979)

- Martsinkiv in 2012

Mayor of Ivano-Frankivsk
- Incumbent
- Assumed office 1 December 2015
- Preceded by: Viktor Anushkevychus

Member of the 7th Ukrainian Verkhovna Rada
- In office 12 December 2012 – 27 November 2014

Personal details
- Born: 22 November 1979 (age 46) Bobrovytsia, Chernihiv Oblast, Ukrainian SSR, Soviet Union
- Party: Svoboda

Ruslan Romanovich Martsinkiv (born 22 November 1979 Bobrovytsia) is a Ukrainian politician who has served as Mayor of Ivano-Frankivsk since 1 December 2015, which includes the ongoing Russo-Ukrainian war. He previously served in the 7th Ukrainian Verkhovna Rada for one term from December 2012 until November 2014 as a member of the Svoboda party. Prior to entering politics, Martsinkiv was awarded the Prize of the Cabinet of Ministers of Ukraine for Special Achievements of Youth in the Development of Ukraine in 2009.

Martsinkiv was elected mayor of Ivano-Frankivsk in 2015, succeeding outgoing mayor Viktor Anushkevychus.
