= Artem Malysh =

Ukrainian footballer

Personal information
- Full name: Artem Volodymyrovych Malysh
- Date of birth: 15 July 2000 (age 26)
- Place of birth: Stara Vyzhivka, Volyn Oblast, Ukraine
- Height: 1.89 m (6 ft 2 1/2 in)
- Position: Goalkeeper

Team information
- Current team: Grobiņas SC
- Number: 1

Youth career
- 200?–2009: Kovel
- 2009–2017: Dynamo Kyiv

Senior career*
Years	Team	Apps	(Gls)
2016–2020	Dynamo Kyiv	0	(0)
2020–2021	Inhulets Petrove	7	(0)
2023–	Grobiņas SC	53	(0)

International career^{‡}
2017	Ukraine U18	1	(0)
- * Club domestic league appearances and goals as of 12 November 2024 ‡ National team caps and goals as of 5 January 2022

Artem Malysh (Ukrainian: Артем Володимирович Малиш; born 15 July 2000) is a Ukrainian professional football goalkeeper who plays for Grobiņas SC.

== Career ==
=== Early years ===
Malysh is a product of Dynamo Kyiv sportive school system, after a short period in the local Kovel youth school.

=== Inhulets Petrove ===
In August 2020 he was transferred to the Ukrainian Premier League débutant Inhulets Petrove. He made his league debut on 21 February 2021, playing as a starting player in the home draw against Vorskla Poltava.

== Personal life ==
His young brother Navin Malysh is also a professional football player.
