= Samuil Guz =

Samuil Yuryevich Guz (Russian: Самуил Юрьевич Гузь; December 5, 1905 in Melitopol, Russian Empire – May 29, 1969 in Zaporizhzhia, Soviet Union) was an important innovator in Soviet Metallurgical Industry and one of the founders of the Soviet Titanium Industry.

== Biography ==
Guz was born to a Jewish family in Melitopol (currently Ukraine), and received his engineering degree in 1927 from the evening division of rabfak, Odessa, (currently Ukraine). He worked at the Dneprovsky Magnesium Works (currently Zaporizhia Titanium-Magnesium Plant) in Zaporizhia, USSR (currently Ukraine). He fought in the Winter War of 1939–1940.

He became Chief Engineer of the Dneprovsky Magnesium Works in 1935, and in 1941, at the beginning of the Great Patriotic War, was in charge of the plant’s evacuation to the village of Solikamsk, in the Eastern Russian region of Ural. The newly founded factory later became the Solikamsk Magnesium Works.

In 1942 he became Director of the Polevskoy Cryolite Plant (town of Polevskoy, Ural Region, Russia). Along with A.F. Pavlov, N.N. Kichin, V.P. Sipailov and V.V. Shchenkov, he developed the technology for industrialized production of titanium at the Polevskoy Cryolite Plant. From 1954 to 1960 he was the Chief Engineer of Zaporizhia Titanium-Magnesium Plant, Zaporizhia, USSR. He was also the Chief Metallurgist of the Titanium Institute, Zaporizhia, USSR (1961–1968), where he took part in the construction and launching of the Bereznikovsky and Ust-Kamenogorsky Titanium Magnesium Plants. He was the chairman of the State Approval Commission for those two enterprises.

S.Yu. Guz authored several textbooks on the technology of titanium production. He was awarded the Stalin Prize (1947) for the “development and industrial implementation of a new method for obtaining chemical products” (titanium). He was awarded many Soviet awards and distinctions: three Orders of the Red Banner of Labour, the Order of the Badge of Honour, the Order of the Red Star and several civilian medals.

== Publications ==
- Г.Н. Богачев, С.Ю. Гузь. Производство криолита фтористого алюминия и фтористого натрия. Москва-Ленинград. (G.N. Bogachev, S.Yu. Guz. Production of Aluminum Fluoride and Sodium Fluoride Cryolite; Moscow-Leningrad). 1940.
- С.Ю. Гузь, Р.Г. Барановская. Производство криолита фтористого алюминия и фтористого натрия. Москва. (S.Yu. Guz, R.G. Baranovskaya. Production of Aluminum Fluoride and Sodium Fluoride Cryolite; Moscow). 1964.
