= Nowiny, Lubusz Voivodeship =

Nowiny
- Village
- Location within Poland
- Coordinates: 52°37′13″N 15°44′52″E
- Country: Poland
- Voivodeship: Lubusz
- County: Międzyrzecz
- Gmina: Przytoczna
- Population: 70

Nowiny [nɔˈvinɨ] is a village in the administrative district of Gmina Przytoczna, within Międzyrzecz County, Lubusz Voivodeship, in western Poland.

The village had a population of 70 in 2008.
