= Twierdzielewo =

- Village
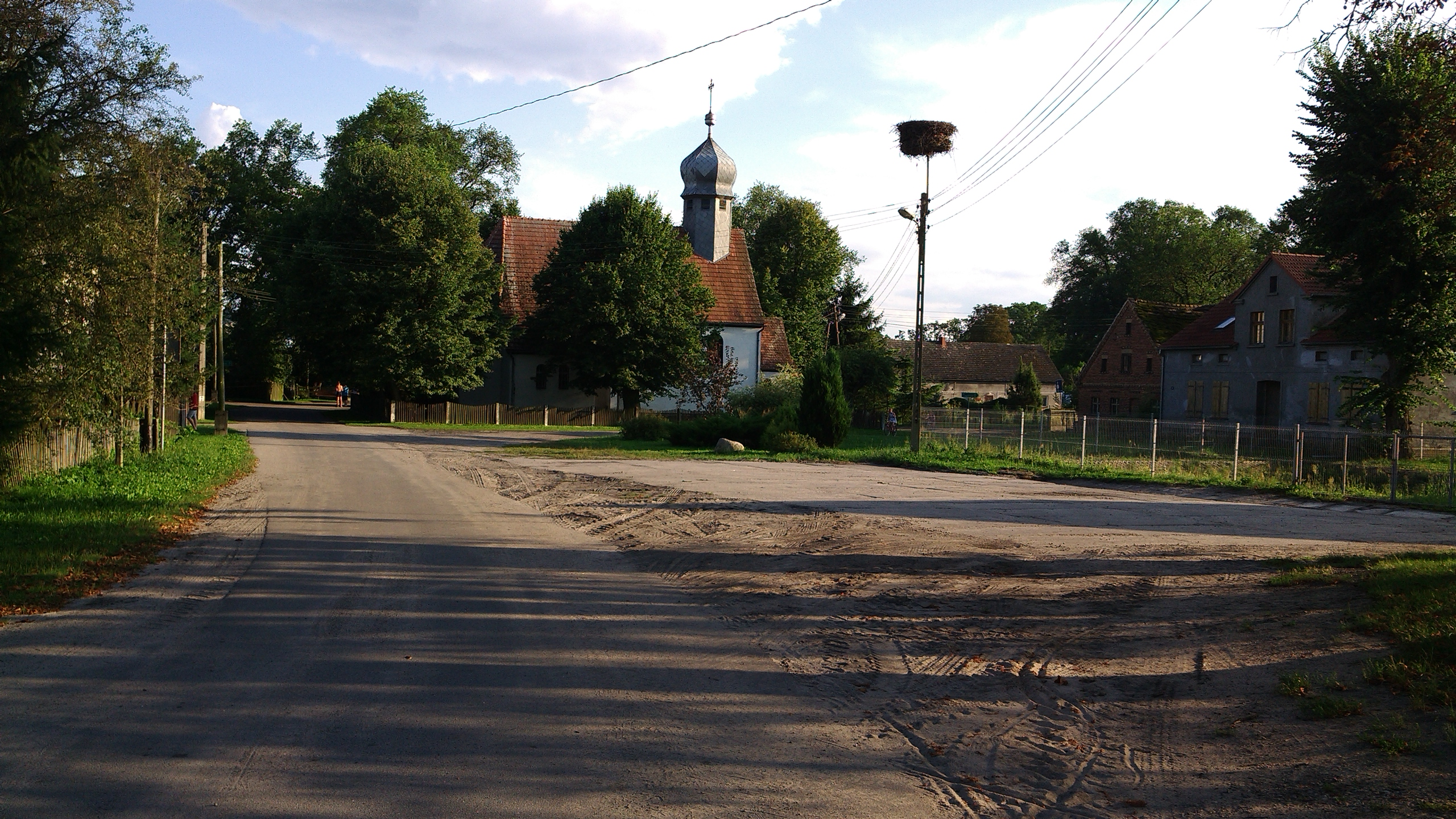

- Location within Poland
- Coordinates: 52°32′N 15°35′E
- Country: Poland
- Voivodeship: Lubusz
- County: Międzyrzecz
- Gmina: Przytoczna

Population (2011)
  - Total: 59
- Time zone: UTC+1 (CET)
  - Summer (DST): UTC+2 (CEST)
- Vehicle registration: FMI

Twierdzielewo [tfjɛrd͡ʑɛˈlɛvɔ] is a village in the administrative district of Gmina Przytoczna, within Międzyrzecz County, Lubusz Voivodeship, in western Poland.

Twierdzielewo was a private church village, administratively located in the Poznań County in the Poznań Voivodeship in the Greater Poland Province of the Kingdom of Poland.

== Demographics (2011 census) ==
	Total	Male	Female
Population	59	31	28
In pre-working age (<18 years)	10	7	3
In working age	41	22	19
In post-working age	8	2	6
