= Nowa Niedrzwica =

- Village
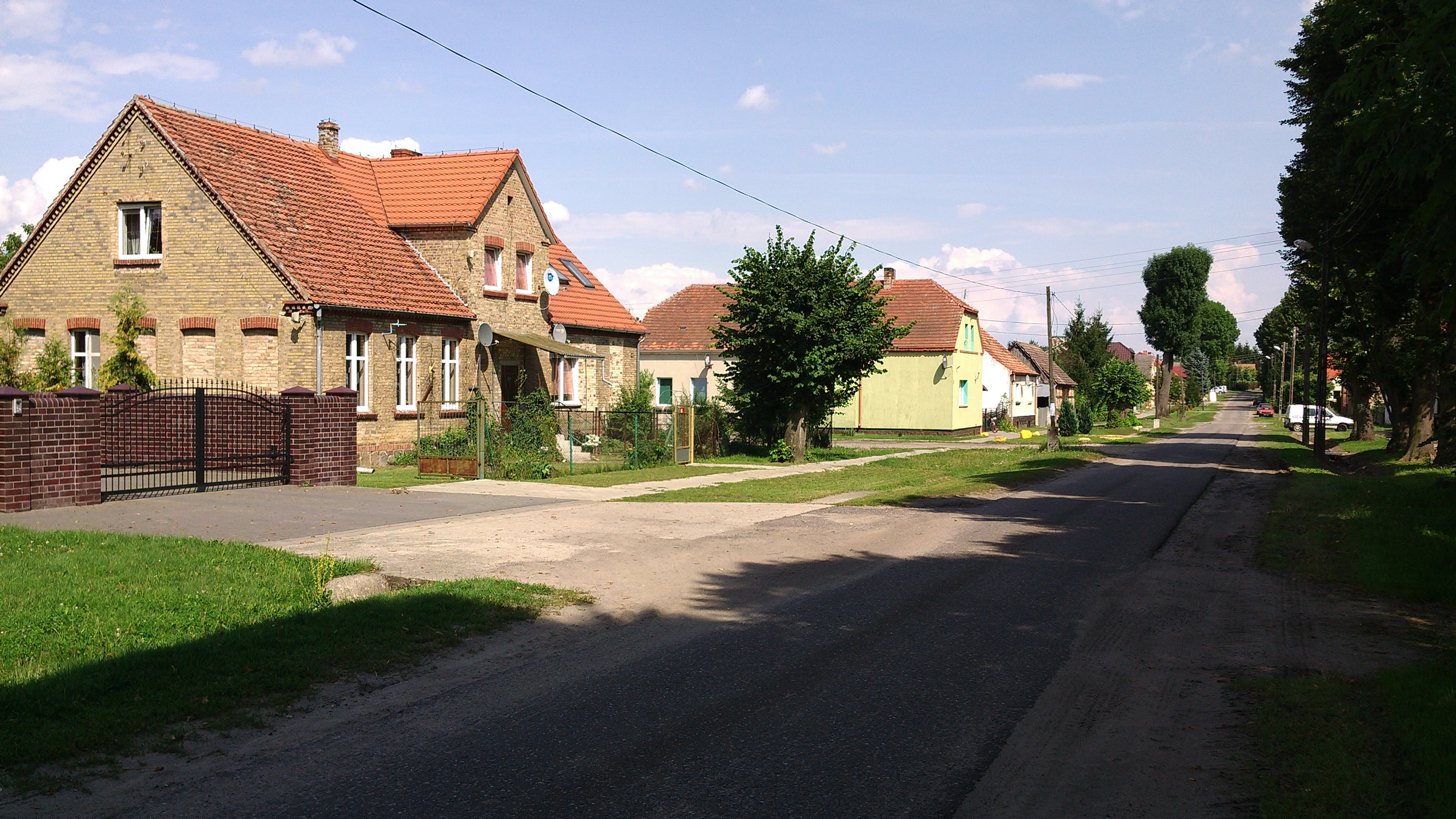

- Location within Poland
- Coordinates: 52°35′N 15°38′E
- Country: Poland
- Voivodeship: Lubusz
- County: Międzyrzecz
- Gmina: Przytoczna

Nowa Niedrzwica [ˈnɔva ɲɛdʐˈvit͡sa] is a village in the administrative district of Gmina Przytoczna, within Międzyrzecz County, Lubusz Voivodeship, in western Poland.
