= Murowiec =

- Settlement
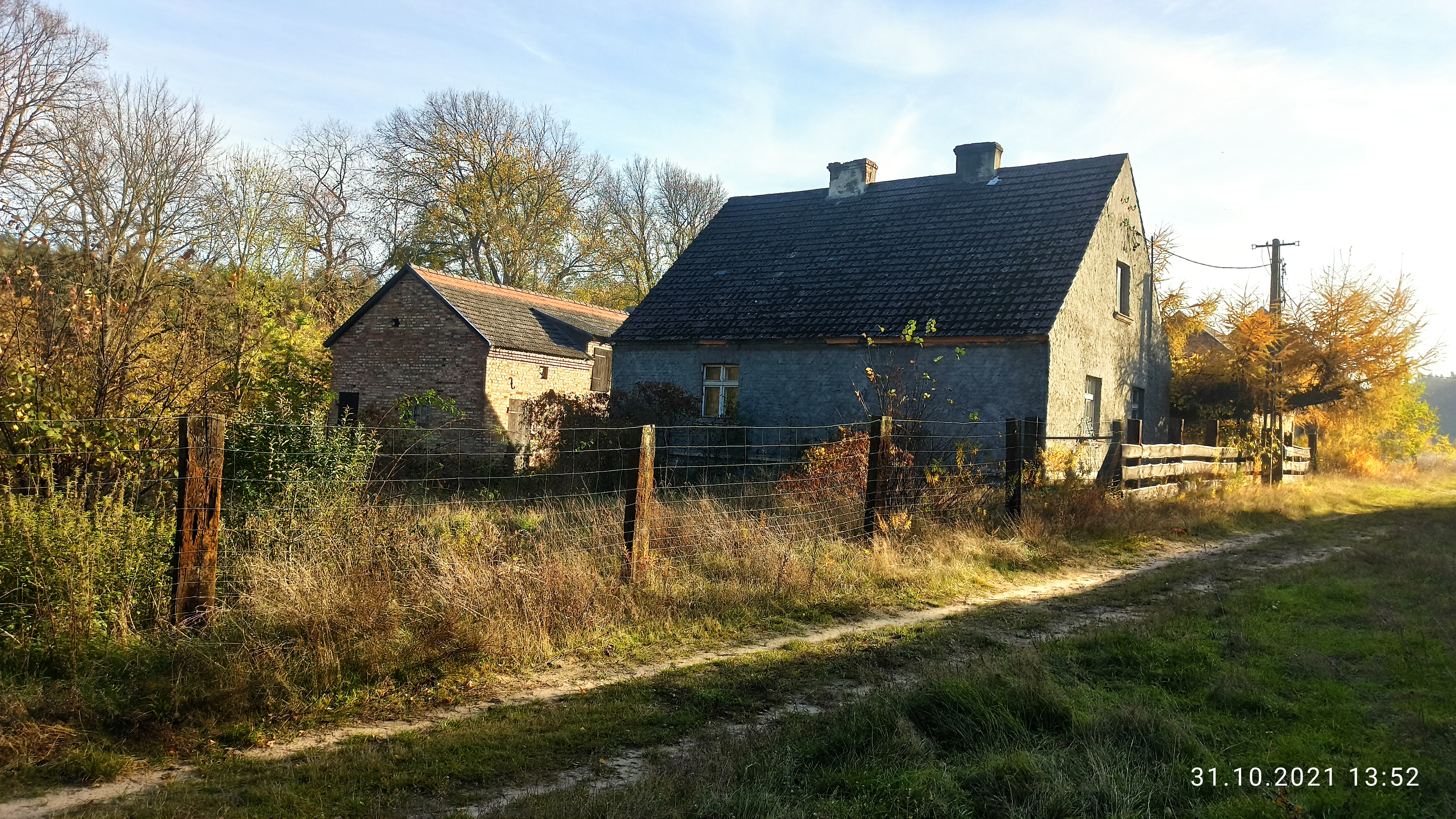

- Location within Poland
- Coordinates: 52°36′05″N 15°39′54″E
- Country: Poland
- Voivodeship: Lubusz
- County: Międzyrzecz
- Gmina: Przytoczna

Murowiec [muˈrɔvjɛt͡s] is a settlement in the administrative district of Gmina Przytoczna, within Międzyrzecz County, Lubusz Voivodeship, in western Poland.
