= Poręba, Lubusz Voivodeship =

Poręba
- Village
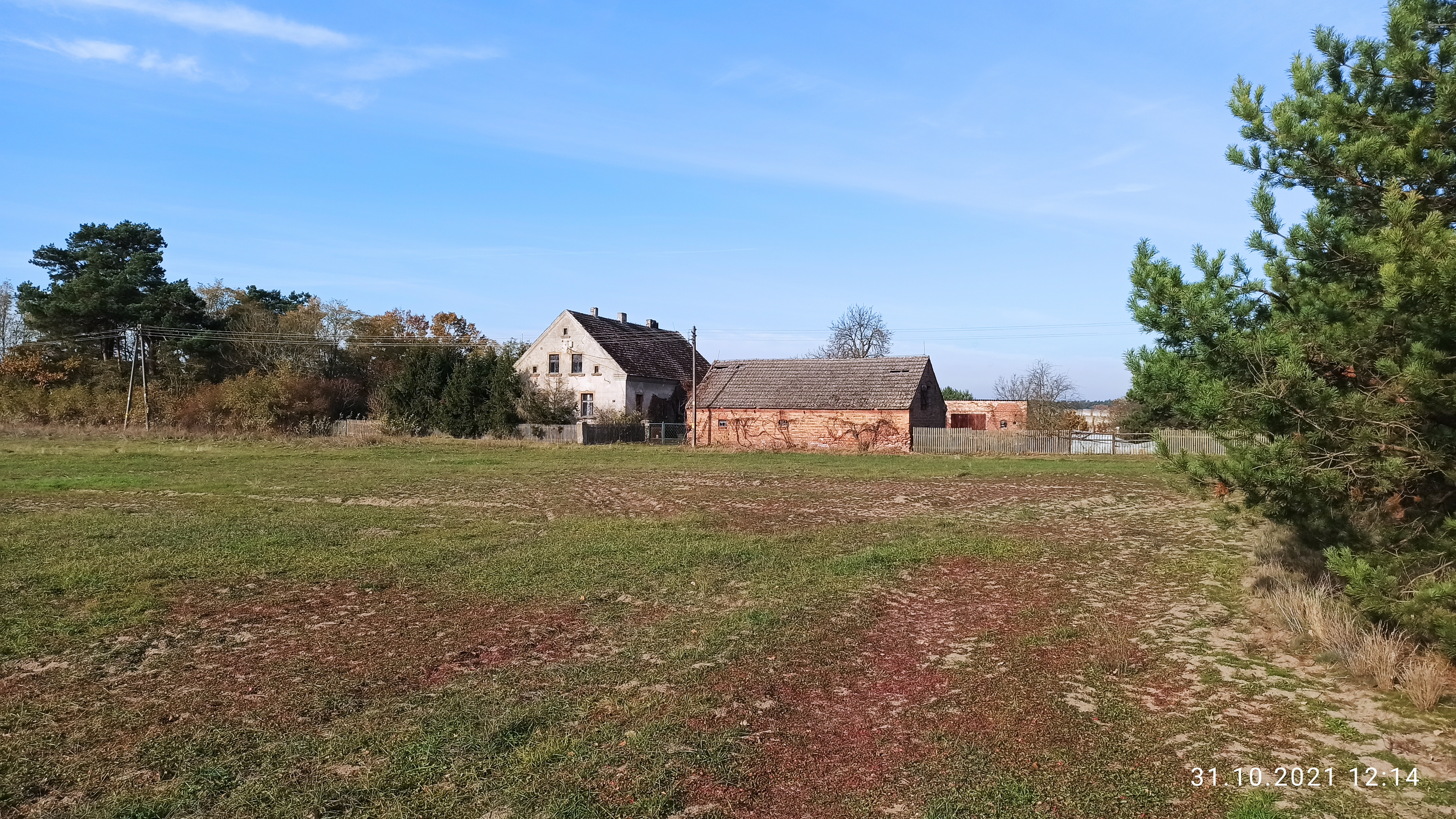

- Location within Poland
- Coordinates: 52°37′26″N 15°41′58″E
- Country: Poland
- Voivodeship: Lubusz
- County: Międzyrzecz
- Gmina: Przytoczna

Poręba [pɔˈrɛmba] (formerly Olędry Róża) is a village in the administrative district of Gmina Przytoczna, within Międzyrzecz County, Lubusz Voivodeship, in western Poland.
