= Viktor Anushkevychus =

Ukrainian politician, engineer and businessman (1962–2026)

Mayor of Ivano-Frankivsk
- In office 26 March 2006 – 1 December 2015
- Preceded by: Zinoviy Shkutiak
- Succeeded by: Ruslan Martsinkiv

Personal details
- Born: 15 November 1962 Vorkuta, Komi ASSR, Russian SFSR, Soviet Union
- Died: 15 September 2026 (aged 63)
- Party: Ukrainian People's Party
- Spouse: Lidia Anushkevychus

Viktor Andriusovich Anushkevychus, also spelled Viktor Anushkevichus, (15 November 1962 – 15 September 2026) was a Ukrainian politician, engineer and businessman, who was a member of the Ukrainian People's Party (UPP). He served as the Mayor of Ivano-Frankivsk for two terms from March 2006 until December 2015. He was one of the first elected officials to prioritize international relations and trade partnerships between Ivano-Frankivsk and other countries.

== Early life and career ==
Viktor Anushkevychus was born on 15 November 1962 in Vorkuta, Komi Autonomous Soviet Socialist Republic (in the present-day Republic of Komi, Russia). His father was a Lithuanian from Kaunas while his Ukrainian mother was from Khmelnytskyi Oblastm Ukraine. Anushkevychus attended high school and technical school in Shepetivka, Khmelnytskyi Oblast, before graduating from the Vinnytsia Polytechnic Institute in 1986.

He moved to the city of Ivano-Frankivsk in 1988, where he initially worked in a sawmill. Following the dissolution of the Soviet Union and the independence of Ukraine, Anushkevychus established a cooperative business in 1991.

== Political career ==
His political career began in 2002, when he was elected to the Ivano-Frankivsk City Council as a member of the Our Ukraine party. He became chairman of the city council commission which oversaw the privatization and lease of communal property.

On 26 March 2006, Viktor Anushkevychus was elected Mayor of Ivano-Frankivsk, winning 50% of the vote. He won re-election to a second term in December 2010 as the candidate from the Ukrainian People's Party. During his tenure, Anushkevychus championed stronger international relations and trade between Ivano-Frankivsk and other countries.

In 2007, Mayor Anushkevychus was awarded the Knight's Cross of the Order for Merits to Lithuania for his promotion of Lithuania–Ukraine relations. He was also the recipient of the Order of Merit of the Republic of Poland in 2013.

Anushkevychus served the mayoral office until 1 December 2015 and was succeeded by Mayor Ruslan Martsinkiv.

Anushkevychus died on 15 September 2026, at the age of 63. He was survived by his wife, Lidia Anushkevychus, and three children. His funeral was held at the Cathedral of the Resurrection of Christ in Ivano-Frankivsk on 17 September, with burial in the city's Demianiv Laz cemetery.
