= Lubikowo =

- Village
- Location within Poland
- Coordinates: 52°33′N 15°42′E
- Country: Poland
- Voivodeship: Lubusz
- County: Międzyrzecz
- Gmina: Przytoczna

Lubikowo [lubiˈkɔvɔ] is a village in the administrative district of Gmina Przytoczna, within Międzyrzecz County, Lubusz Voivodeship, in western Poland. As of 2008, the population was 835.
