= Chełmicko =

- Village
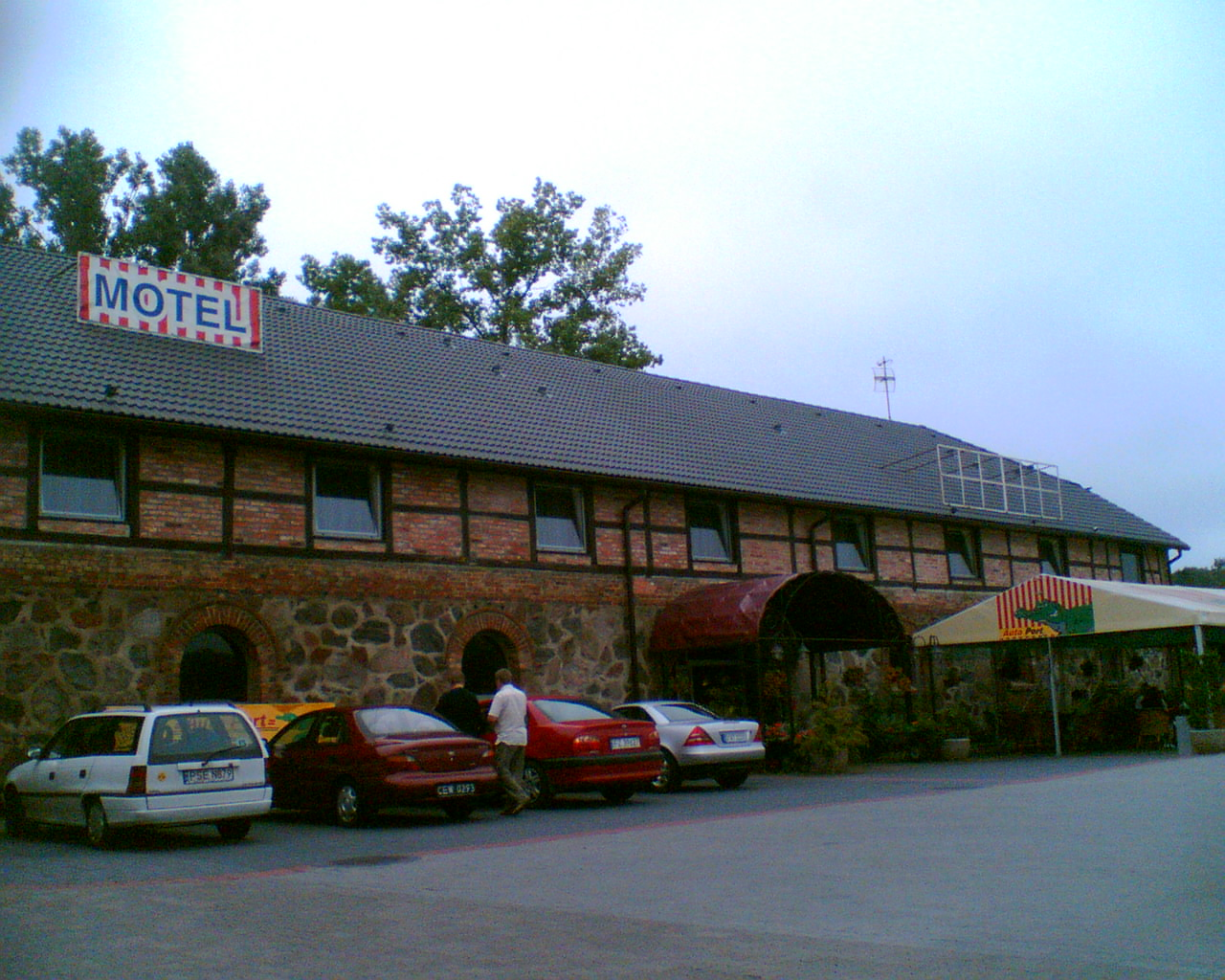

- Location within Poland
- Coordinates: 52°34′16″N 15°38′8″E
- Country: Poland
- Voivodeship: Lubusz
- County: Międzyrzecz
- Gmina: Przytoczna
- Population: 20

Chełmicko [xɛu̯ˈmit͡skɔ] is a village in the administrative district of Gmina Przytoczna, within Międzyrzecz County, Lubusz Voivodeship, in western Poland.
