= Przytoczna =

- Village
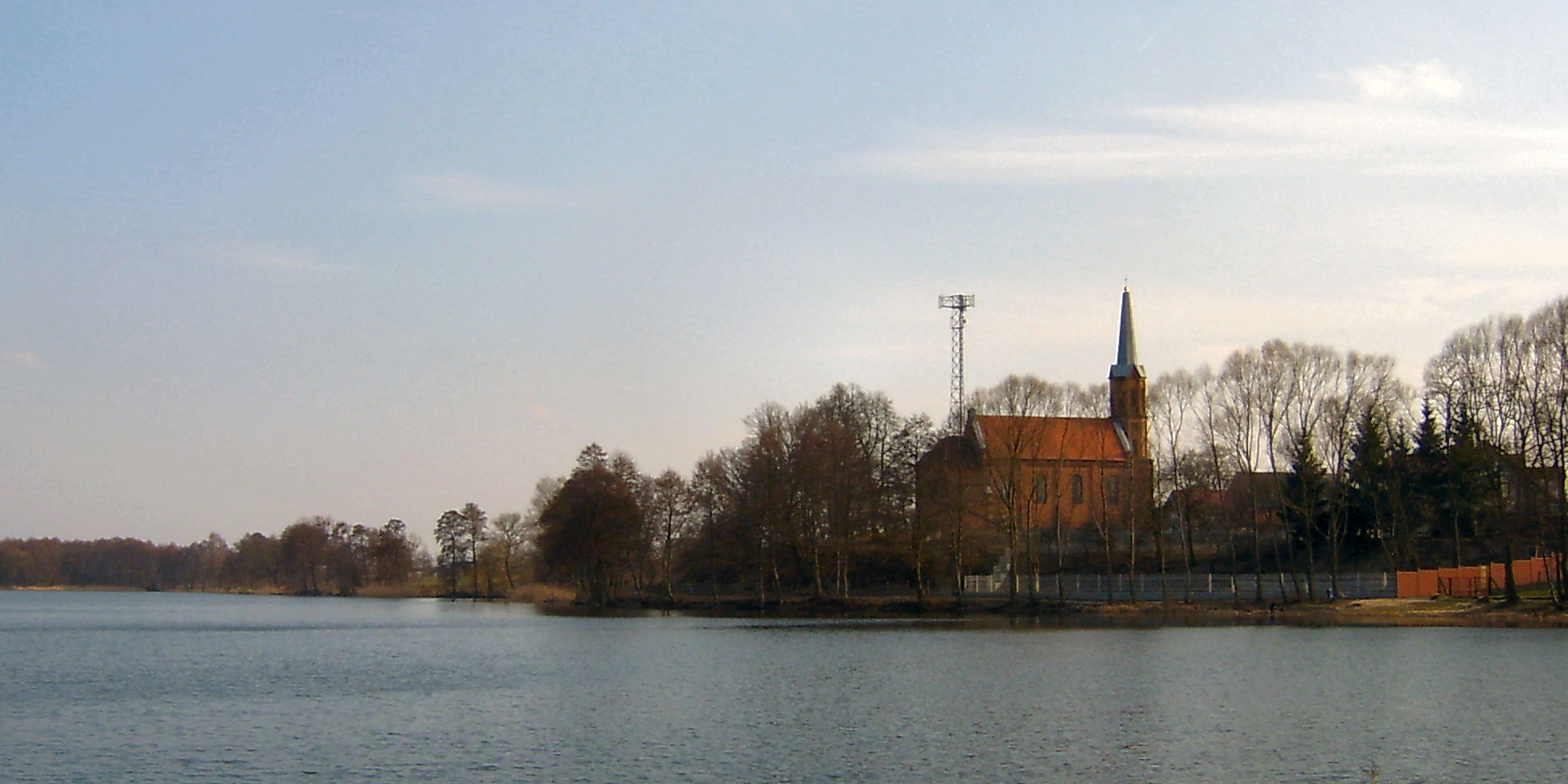
- Przytoczno Lake and Holy Trinity church

- Location within Poland
- Coordinates: 52°34′N 15°40′E
- Country: Poland
- Voivodeship: Lubusz
- County: Międzyrzecz
- Gmina: Przytoczna
- First mentioned: 1397

Population
  - Total: 2,400
- Time zone: UTC+1 (CET)
  - Summer (DST): UTC+2 (CEST)
- Vehicle registration: FMI

Przytoczna [pʂɨˈtɔt͡ʂna] (formerly German: Prittisch) is a village in Międzyrzecz County, Lubusz Voivodeship, in western Poland. It is the seat of the gmina (administrative district) called Gmina Przytoczna. It is situated on the shore of Przytoczno Lake.

== History ==
The oldest known written mention of the village comes from 1397. It was administratively located in the Poznań County in the Poznań Voivodeship in the Greater Poland Province of the Kingdom of Poland until its annexation by the Kingdom of Prussia in the Second Partition of Poland in 1793. After the successful Greater Poland uprising of 1806, it was regained by Poles and included within the short-lived Duchy of Warsaw. After the duchy's dissolution, it was re-annexed by Prussia in 1815, and then also became part of Germany in 1871. It became again part of Poland after Germany's defeat in World War II.
