= Goraj, Lubusz Voivodeship =

Goraj
- Village
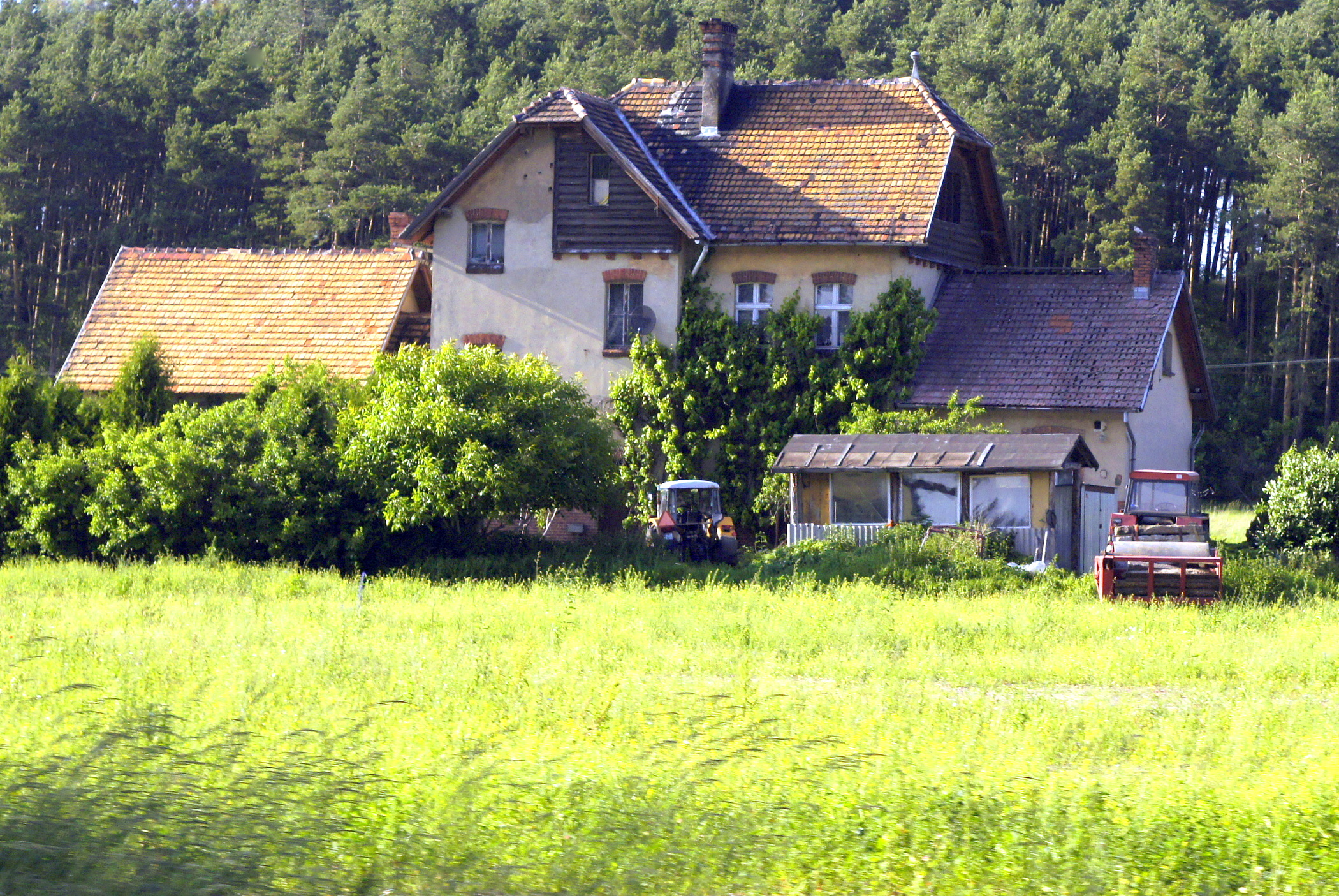
- Railway station

- Location within Poland
- Coordinates: 52°34′47″N 15°44′23″E
- Country: Poland
- Voivodeship: Lubusz
- County: Międzyrzecz
- Gmina: Przytoczna
- Population: 530

Goraj [ˈɡɔrai̯] is a village in the administrative district of Gmina Przytoczna, within Międzyrzecz County, Lubusz Voivodeship, in western Poland.
