= Ihor Huz =

Ukrainian politician

- Ігор Гузь
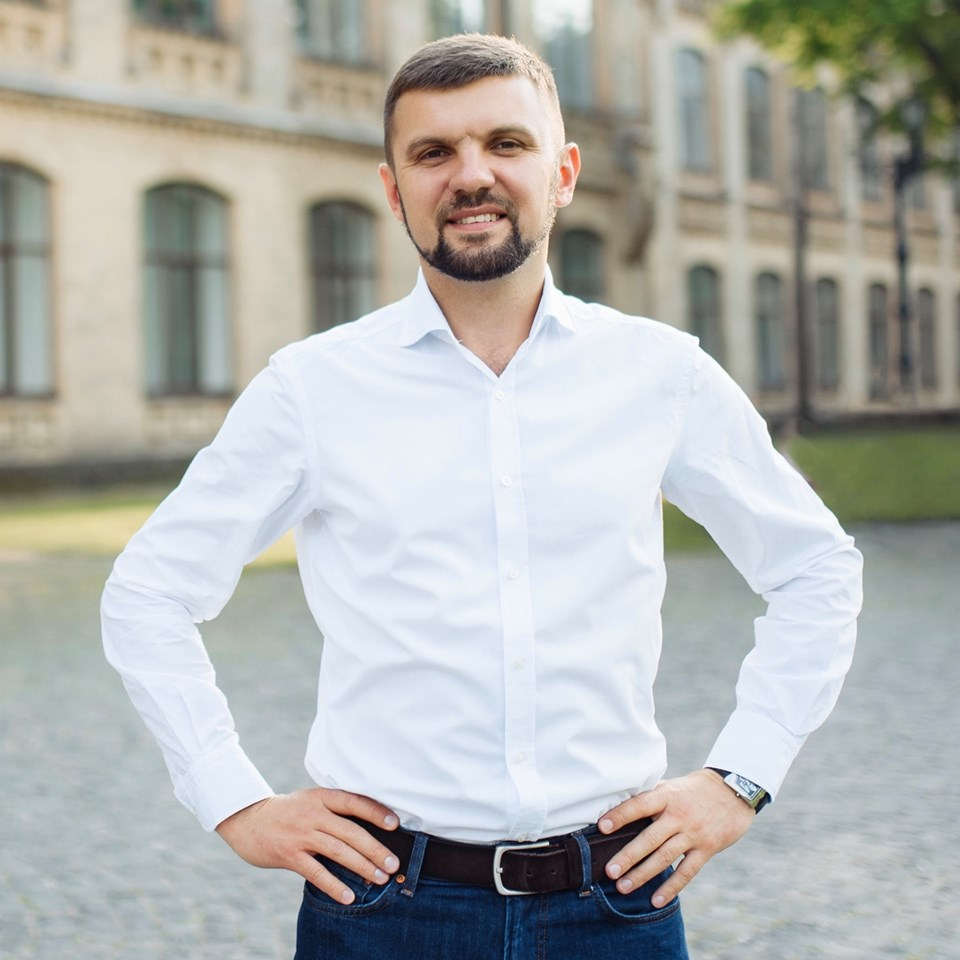

People's Deputy of Ukraine
- Incumbent
- Assumed office 26 October 2014
- Preceded by: Yevhen Melnyk
- Constituency: Volyn Oblast, No. 19

Personal details
- Born: 11 January 1982 (age 44) Lutsk, Ukrainian SSR, Soviet Union (now Ukraine)
- Party: For the Future (since 2019)
- Other political affiliations: Independent; People's Front
- Education: Lesya Ukrainka Eastern European National University

Ihor Volodymyrovych Huz (Ukrainian: Ігор Володимирович Гузь; born 11 January 1982) is a Ukrainian politician currently serving as a People's Deputy of Ukraine in Ukraine's 19th electoral district in the Volyn Oblast, a role he has held since 2014. He is a member of the For the Future parliamentary group in the Verkhovna Rada, the parliament of Ukraine. In the early 2000s, Huz was a leader of the Ukraine without Kuchma protests.

== Biography ==
Ihor Huz was born in Lutsk, Volyn Oblast on 11 January 1982. His mother's side of his family comes from the Svirzhe village in the Kholmshchyna region, and his father's side originates from the village of Smidyn in the district of Stara Vyzhivka, Volyn region. Huz studied at secondary school #19 in Lutsk. Huz later graduated from Lesya Ukrainka Volyn State University, his specialty being the scientific study of politics, teacher of politics.

== Participation in the campaign “Ukraine without Kuchma” ==
During 2001, Huz served as a co-facilitator of the Volyn Branch of the Committee for Truth!. On March 9, 2001, he became a participant of the campaign Ukraine without Kuchma after the murder of Georgiy Gongadze. He participated in an attempt to storm the police cordon, which had been put up for Ukrainian President Leonid Kuchma on the campus of T. Shevchenko University of Kyiv. Because of their actions he and several other students were beaten and detained by the Berkut. He spent several days in the pretrial detention facility. By end of the campaign, Huz was interrogated 10 times by the Security Service of Ukraine, the Ministry of Internal Affairs, and the Prosecutor General's Office.

On March 15, 2018, at the Verkhovna Rada, in conjunction with his allies, he demanded the adoption by Parliament of a resolution on the rehabilitation of 17 activists who had been sentenced by order of President Kuchma.

== Chornobyl Way rally and arrest in Belarus ==
On March 26, 2005, he, along with other members of the National Alliance, supporting the Belarusian opposition in overthrowing the government of Belarusian President Alexander Lukashenko, along with hundreds of other activists, joined the protest. Even then, protesters demanded the resignation of the President of Belarus and the release of imprisoned comrades.

The rally was brutally suppressed by Belarusian OMON. Ihor and his comrades were arrested and imprisoned in the Minsk pretrial detention facility. In protest, they went on a hunger strike and only after 10 days had been released. Also for participation in protest campaigns, all representatives of the National Alliance were deported from Belarus for 5 years.

More than 10 years later, People's Deputy Ihor Huz was refused entry to Belarus when he tried to come to the country to participate in the Chornobyl Way rally.

== Work in local self-government bodies ==
In March 2002, Huz was elected a deputy of Lutsk city council for constituency No. 44. He was a member of the commission that took care of youth, education and science matters.

In March 2006 he was elected a deputy of the Volyn Oblast Council on the list of the electoral block Our Ukraine. He was the chairman of the standing parliamentary commission on youth policy, sports and tourism.

From 2007 to 2011 - Advisor to Lutsk Mayor on a regular basis, Head of the Department of Family and Youth Affairs of Lutsk City Council.

In October 2010, he was elected a deputy of the Volyn Oblast Council in the single member constituency No. 27 (district of Stara Vyzhivka). He was a member of the Committee on Budget, Finance and Pricing.

On February 20, 2014, he was elected Deputy Chairman of the Volyn Regional Council.

== Activities during the Euromaidan ==
Huz was one of Lutsk Euromaidan coordinators. For participation in protest campaigns, law enforcement authorities opened a criminal case against Ihor Huz for committing an offense under Articles 296 Part 2, 295, 341 of the Criminal Code of Ukraine. The politician was charged with "carrying Yanukovych’s portraits" from the premises of the Volyn Regional Council; calls for actions that threaten public order; seizure of state or public buildings or structures".

On December 25, 2013, the Lutsk City District Court ruled to impose a 60-day house arrest measure on Ihor Huz with the use of an electronic bracelet to control the suspect's movement. On December 30, 2013, the Court of Appeal of Volyn Region ruled on mitigation of the restraint measure against the suspect.

== Participation in parliamentary elections ==
In the 2012 parliamentary elections, Huz was a candidate from the Batkivshchyna Party in the single mandate constituency No. 21 (Kovel, the districts of Kovel, Ratne, Stara Vyzhivka, Shatsk) and won more than 36.39% of the vote, losing less than one percent to Stepan Ivakhiv.

In the 2014 parliamentary elections, he was a candidate in the single mandate constituency No. 19 from the People's Front (Novovolynsk, Volodymyr-Volynskyi, the districts of Ivanychi, Liuboml, Volodymyr -Volynskyi) and won by a landslide, receiving 30.69% (27,243) of votes.

In 2019, he ran for the snap elections to the Verkhovna Rada (the Ukrainian parliament) in the single mandate constituency No. 19 as a self-nominated candidate. According to the results of the voting established by the district election commission, the current people's deputy won 217 polling stations (97.7%) out of 222. The polling results showed 59.69% support. 41 106 voters cast votes for Huz. In parliament he joined the For the Future faction.

== Foreign political activity ==
A participant of the Chornobyl Way - 2005 rally in Minsk. Sentenced to 10 days of administrative arrest. Deported from Belarus with a ban on entry to this country for 5 years. Amnesty International recognized him as a prisoner of conscience.

On May 25, 2016, the People's Deputy was not allowed to enter the territory of the Pridnestrovian Moldavian Republic to meet with the Ukrainian expat community.

=== Critics ===
According to media reports, he bribed voters by distributing medical equipment. Also, his charity fund "Pribuzhzhya" became a sponsor of the concert on the Day of the city of Luboml, Volyn region.

In 2017, a considerable amount of subventions was received by the No.19 constituency in Volyn, represented by the People's Front MP Ihor Huz, namely about UAH 26 million, according to journalists from the "Chesno" movement. However, among the companies and individuals who won tenders for the provision of certain services in the No.19 district through subventions, there is a man whose relative worked for the People's Deputy Igor Guz, according to an investigation by journalists of the "Chesno" movement.

== Work in the Verkhovna Rada ==
While working in the Verkhovna Rada of the 8th convocation, Huz attended 96% of the meetings and following his principles did not engage in «piano playing» during votings. According to the results of legislative activity, he became the first in the rating of the deputies-reformers from VoxUkraine and one of the most effective majoritarian MPs on the results of monitoring of the civil network OPORA.

Deputy Chairman of the Committee on State Building, Local Governance, Regional and Urban Development in the Verkhovna Rada of Ukraine of the 9th convocation (since 29 August 2019).

== Public activities ==
Belonged to the Youth Nationalist Congress, a chairman of the Volyn organization from 2001 to 2005, and a deputy chairman of the All-Ukrainian organization from 2002 to 2005. From 2005 to 2013 he was the chairman of the All-Ukrainian Youth NGO «National Alliance».

On April 22, 2015, he founded the Ihor Huz Foundation «Prybuzhia», which operates in the territory of Ivanychi, Volodymyr-Volynskyi, Lyuboml districts and the cities of Novovolynsk and Volodymyr-Volynskyi. The Foundation has been involved in various activities in the territory of Prybuzhia and also supports the activities of different society groups: ATO participants, NGOs of children with special needs, housing cooperatives, creative youth, etc..

On April 11, 2016, at the initiative of MP Ihor Huz, the Local Self-Government Association of Prybuzhia started its work. The main purpose of the Association is to promote the active implementation of the decentralization reform, as well as to intensify the international cooperation of the Ukrainian local self-government bodies with various foreign communities. At the same time, a memorandum of intent was signed between the Association of Local Self-Government «Prybuzhia» and the Union of Municipalities of Lubelskie Region.

== Interests ==
Huz enjoys running and swimming, including long distances. On August 22, 2012, within the framework of the campaign «Save the Svitiaz» aimed at attracting public attention to the problem of building a Hotyslav quarry from Belarus, Ihor Huz swam across the largest of Shatsk Lakes - Svitiaz.

On August 20, 2016, Ihor Huz, along with his friend Valerii Makaruk, swam along the Svitiaz, dedicating the race to the 25th anniversary of Independence of Ukraine.

In order to promote a healthy lifestyle, on August 26, 2017, for the first time in the Volyn region, cross-triathlon (sprint) competitions were held in Volyn in the village of Smidyn of the Stara Vyzhivka Raion, with participation of 81 athletes from all over Ukraine.

In November 2019, Huz walked 100 kilometers in just over a day without food and sleep as part of the #pohod100 campaign.

== Initiatives ==
=== Bandershtat Festival ===
In 2007, he initiated the All-Ukrainian Bandershtat Festival for the first time. Today, the event is an art landmark of Volyn. It is a non-alcoholic patriotic family festival, enriched with intellectual music and has a cozy atmosphere. Bandershtat is the only three-day music festival in Ukraine that has been held for the 13th time in 2019.

The number of visitors is increasing every year. In 2019 alone, 2,213 combatants attended the festival for free. About 600 children under the age of 12 accompanied by adults also visited Bandershtat. 7 countries are the geography of the festival: Most of the guests were from the US, UAE, Israel, France, Poland and Belarus. The event has even become the subject of Russian propaganda. As the chairman of the organizing committee, Ihor is convinced that the main task of the festival is to spread information about Bandera, the UPA and the ideology of Ukrainian nationalism through the modern format.

=== Kniazhyi Festival ===
In 2017, he started a two-day historical and cultural Kniazhyi festival on the territory of the village of Zarichia, Zviahel Raion. The event is intended to revive the tourist potential of the region, to promote high-quality music, literary conversations, to reconstruct the princely era, the culture of that time, crafts, and everyday life. Also, according to the organizers’ decision, it is free from alcohol and is aimed at promoting a healthy lifestyle. In 2017 and 2018, it was visited by 9,000 people. In 2019, a record 10,500 people visited the festival.

=== Polissia Challenge Cup ===
The Polissia Challenge Cup 2017 cross-triathlon competition was held for the first time in 2017 on the initiative of Huz, in the Volyn Polissia region. 81 participants from all over Ukraine, including their coaches, took part in the competition in Volyn. Professional athletes, business people, public officials and amateurs took part in a course passing through three Volyn villages Somyn, Lukiv, and Smidyn putting their strength and endurance to the test.

In 2019, the Ukrainian Cross-Triathlon Championship was held for the third time. It was attended by almost 120 athletes from different regions of Ukraine and even other countries.

== Honours ==
Awarded with the Cabinet of Ministers Prize for special achievements of youth in development of Ukraine (2005).
