= Krasne Dłusko =

- Village
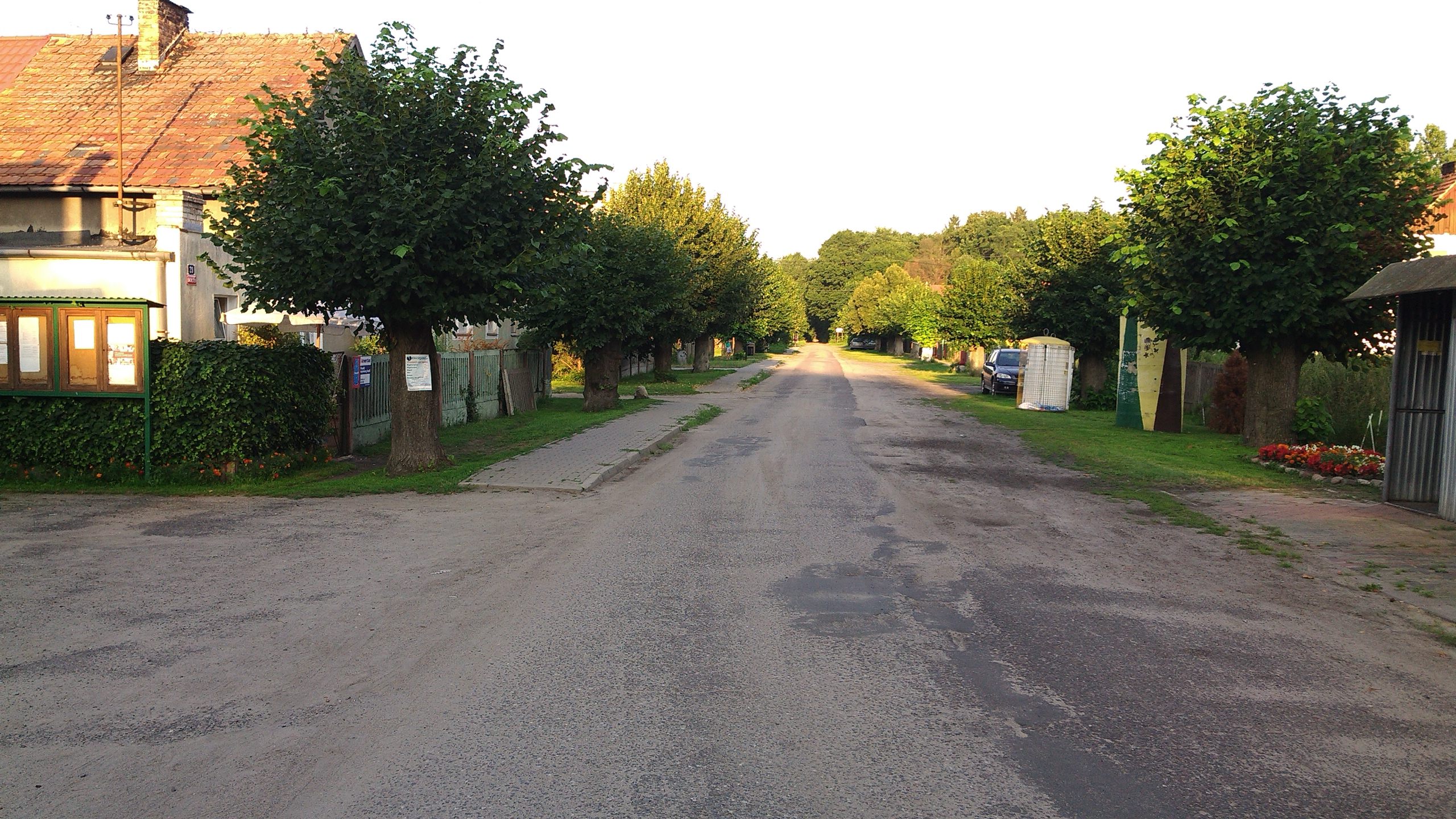

- Location within Poland
- Coordinates: 52°36′N 15°37′E
- Country: Poland
- Voivodeship: Lubusz
- County: Międzyrzecz
- Gmina: Przytoczna

Krasne Dłusko [ˈkrasnɛ ˈdwuskɔ] is a village in the administrative district of Gmina Przytoczna, within Międzyrzecz County, Lubusz Voivodeship, in western Poland.
