= Krobielewo =

- Village
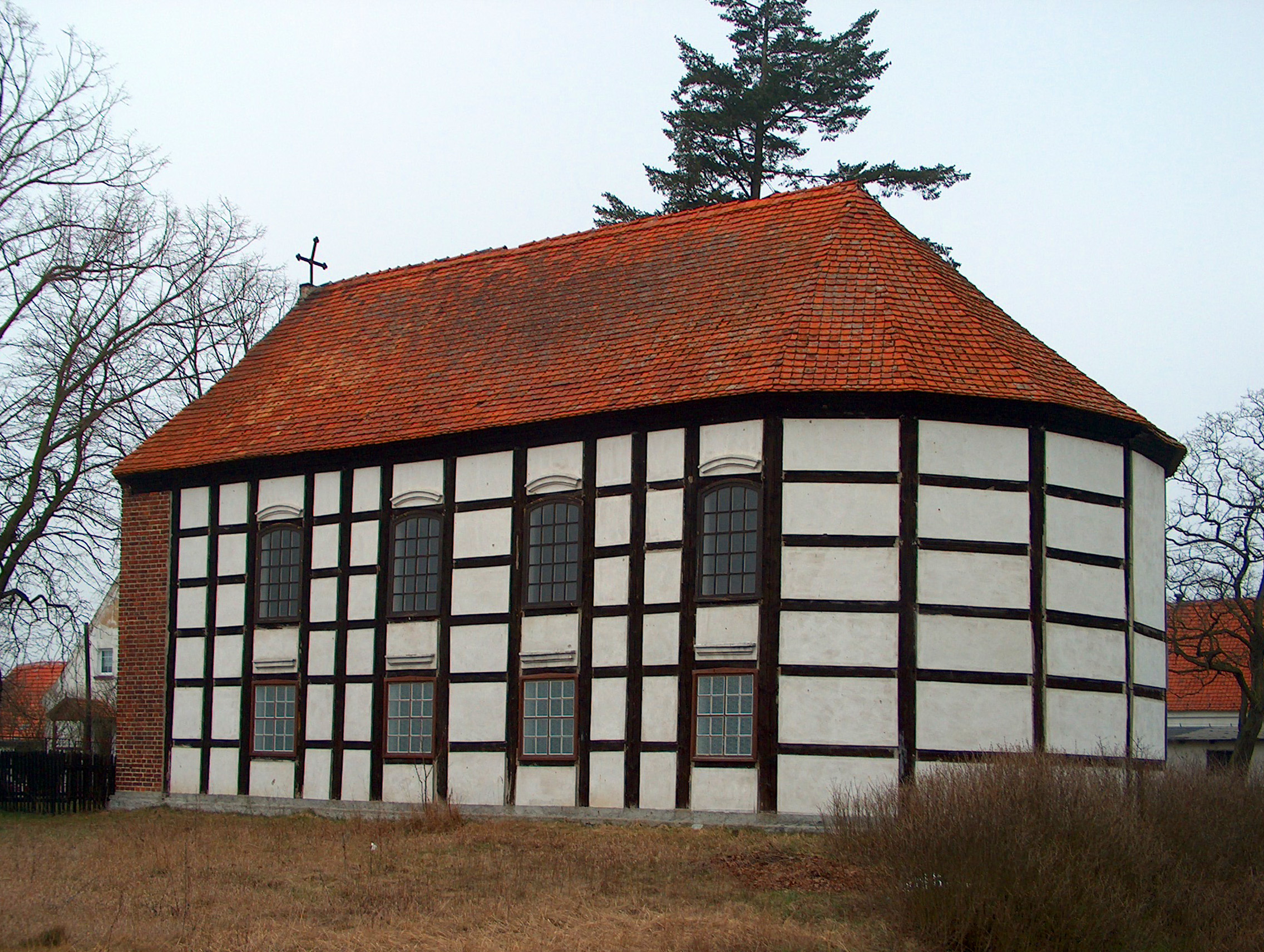
- Church

- Location within Poland
- Coordinates: 52°37′N 15°44′E
- Country: Poland
- Voivodeship: Lubusz
- County: Międzyrzecz
- Gmina: Przytoczna

Krobielewo [krɔbjɛˈlɛvɔ] is a village in the administrative district of Gmina Przytoczna, within Międzyrzecz County, Lubusz Voivodeship, in western Poland.
