= Chełmsko, Lubusz Voivodeship =

Chełmsko
- Village
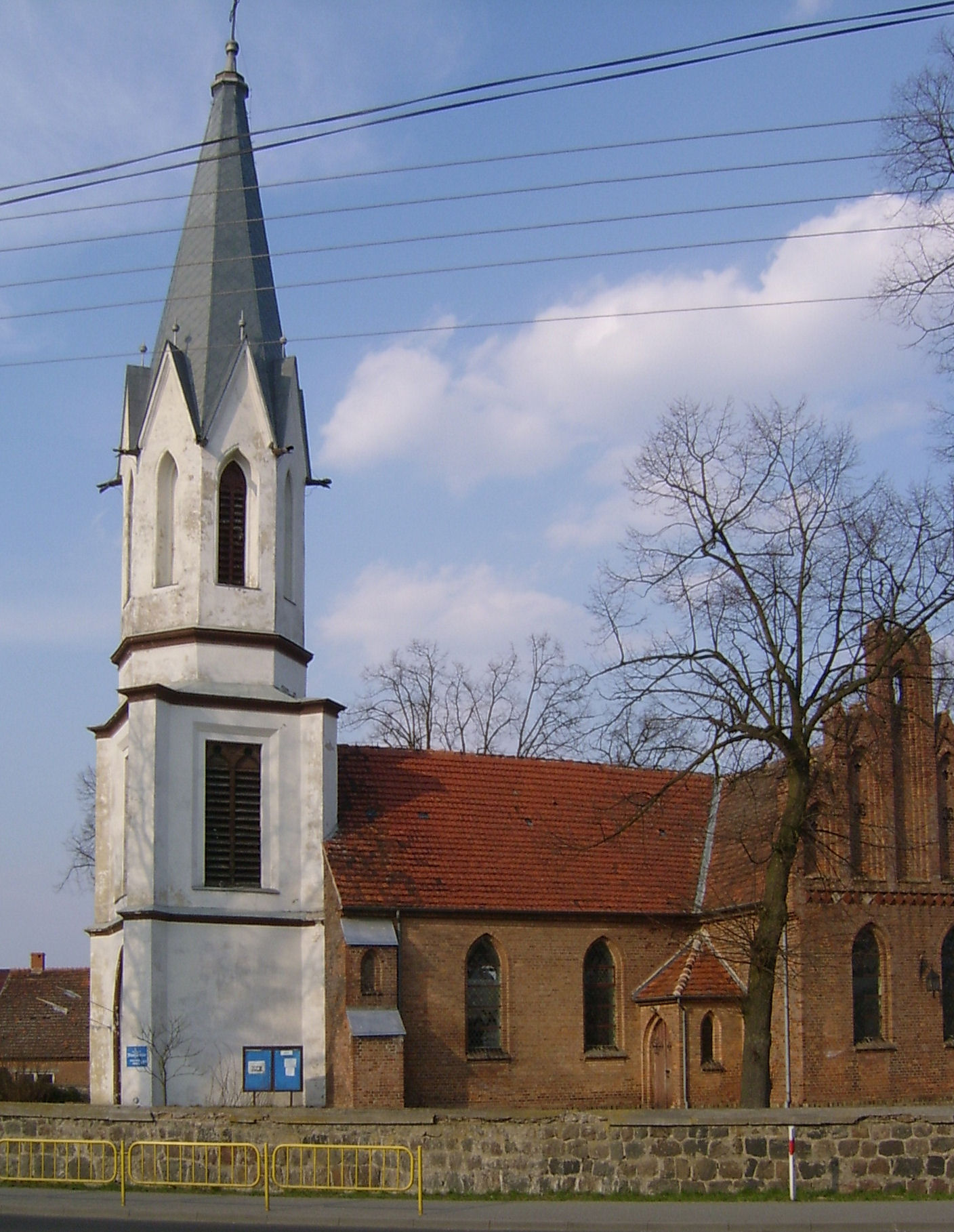
- Saint Casimir church in Chełmsko

- Location within Poland
- Coordinates: 52°34′N 15°33′E
- Country: Poland
- Voivodeship: Lubusz
- County: Międzyrzecz
- Gmina: Przytoczna
- Time zone: UTC+1 (CET)
  - Summer (DST): UTC+2 (CEST)
- Vehicle registration: FMI

Chełmsko [ˈxɛu̯mskɔ] is a village in the administrative district of Gmina Przytoczna, within Międzyrzecz County, Lubusz Voivodeship, in western Poland.

Chełmsko was a private church village, administratively located in the Poznań County in the Poznań Voivodeship in the Greater Poland Province of the Kingdom of Poland.
