= Savannah Schroll Guz =

American mixed-media artist and writer

Savannah Schroll Guz (born 1974) is an American mixed-media artist, art critic, and fiction writer. She is also author of three books of fiction, including the politically conscious fiction anthologies American Soma and In the Aftermath. She is one of 36 contributors to the national art project Her Flag, which celebrates the ratification of the 19th Amendment. Guz was named a West Virginia History Hero at the West Virginia Division of Arts, Culture and History in Charleston, West Virginia, on February 24, 2022.

== Biography ==
Born in York, Pennsylvania in 1974, she attended Juniata College, graduating summa cum laude in 1997. She then went on to study German Expressionism as a Fulbright Scholar from 1997 to 1998 at LMU Munich, Germany. Here, she worked at the Neue Pinakothek for Alte Pinakothek Curator Dr. Konrad Renger, specialist in 17th-century Flemish painting. She also served as a correspondence translator for both General Director Dr. Johann Georg, Prince von Hohenzollern and for the Bavarian National Museum. She returned to the United States in July 1998 to study at the University of Pittsburgh, where she earned a master's degree in art history in 2000.

Guz began writing fiction in 2000, while working in public affairs at the Smithsonian Institution. By 2004, she released her first collection of short stories, The Famous & The Anonymous (Better Non Sequitur), and by 2005, she edited the theme-based fiction anthology, Consumed: Women on Excess (So New Publishing). In 2004, she was nominated for a Pushcart Prize and a storySouth Million Writers Award.

Of Guz's collection American Soma, author and Chicago Public Radio Contributor Charles Blackstone wrote:

"American Soma is a paragon of modern fiction and a rare glimpse at its future. Savannah Schroll Guz’s trenchant wit and uncompromising candor fuel every sentence, propelling these stories with revitalizing, visceral language that is not just evocative in the contextual reading moment, but transcends the limits of the page, by virtue of its abounding strength. Quirky, yet accessible short fiction that’s at once serious and hilarious, raw and refined, American Soma is a provocative collection I know we’ll be talking about for a long time to come."

Since 2012, Guz has primarily become a mixed-media artist. Her drawings have illustrated books and literary journals, such as Folio, Box Car Poetry Review, the Boiler, Your Impossible Voice, Wild Woman Rising, Meat for Tea, and Gravel Magazine, among others. Her work is in private collections from NYC to San Diego and has been shown in various venues throughout the United States, including the Creative York, Rochester Contemporary Art Center, and Foundry Art Centre in St. Charles, Missouri.

== Fiction works ==
- The Famous & The Anonymous, short stories (San Diego: Better Non Sequitur, 2004)
- Consumed: Women on Excess, editor, fiction anthology (Eugene, Oregon: So New Publishing, 2005)
- American Soma, short stories, (Chicago: So New, 2009)
- In the Aftermath, short stories, (Pittsburgh: Literary Outlaw, 2012).

== Sources ==
- Savannah Schroll Guz's art criticism in Pittsburgh City Paper: https://www.pghcitypaper.com/author/savannah-schroll-guz
- Savannah Schroll Guz's art criticism in American Craft Magazine: https://craftcouncil.org/people/savannah-schroll-guz
- Savannah Schroll Guz's Amazon author page https://www.amazon.com/Savannah-Schroll-Guz/e/B0035LLWHG/ref=ntt_athr_dp_pel_1
- Fictionaut. Savannah Schroll Guz http://fictionaut.com/users/savannah-schroll-guz
- Library Thing Author. "Savannah Schroll Guz"
- "Strange Weird and Wonderful". D. L. Russell Interviewed Savannah Schroll Guz, November 2008.
- SmokeLong Quarterly. Smoking with Savannah Schroll Guz, March 2008.
- Thomas, Clint. "Traveling 'Her Flag' art project creator unfurls virtual venture in person." Charleston Gazette-Mail, 26 Jun. 2020.
- Word Riot. To Open With No Piece Unprotected: A Game of Grotesque Gothic Chess With Savannah Schroll by J.F. Campbell, 2005.
- Identity Theory. Ryan Kennebeck interviews the author of The Famous & the Anonymous, 2004.
