= Gaj, Lubusz Voivodeship =

Gaj
- Village
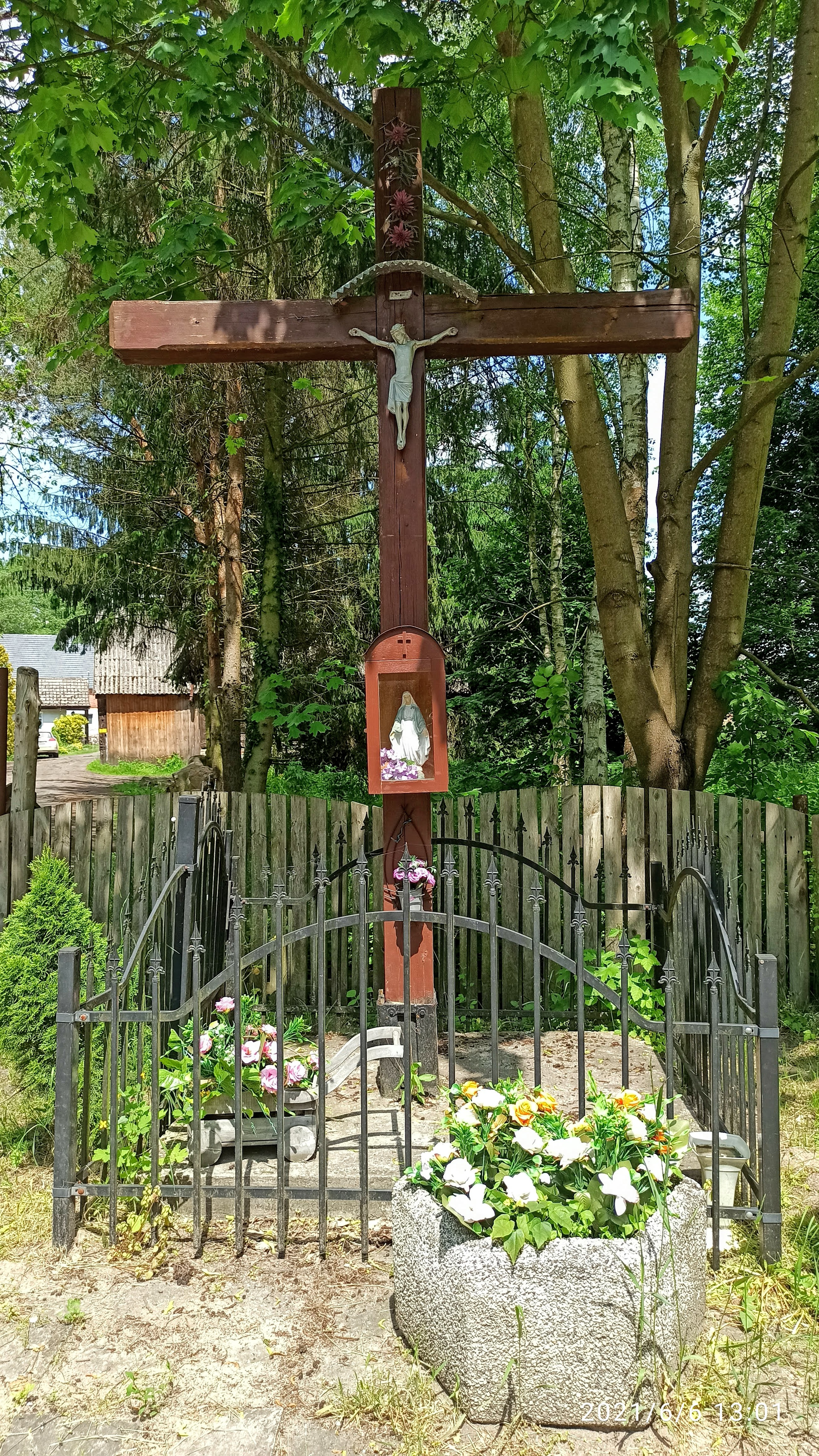
- Roadside cross

- Location within Poland
- Coordinates: 52°37′09″N 15°41′10″E
- Country: Poland
- Voivodeship: Lubusz
- County: Międzyrzecz
- Gmina: Przytoczna

Gaj [ɡai̯] is a village in the administrative district of Gmina Przytoczna, within Międzyrzecz County, Lubusz Voivodeship, in western Poland.
