= Stara Vyzhivka =

Rural locality in Volyn Oblast, Ukraine

- Rural settlement
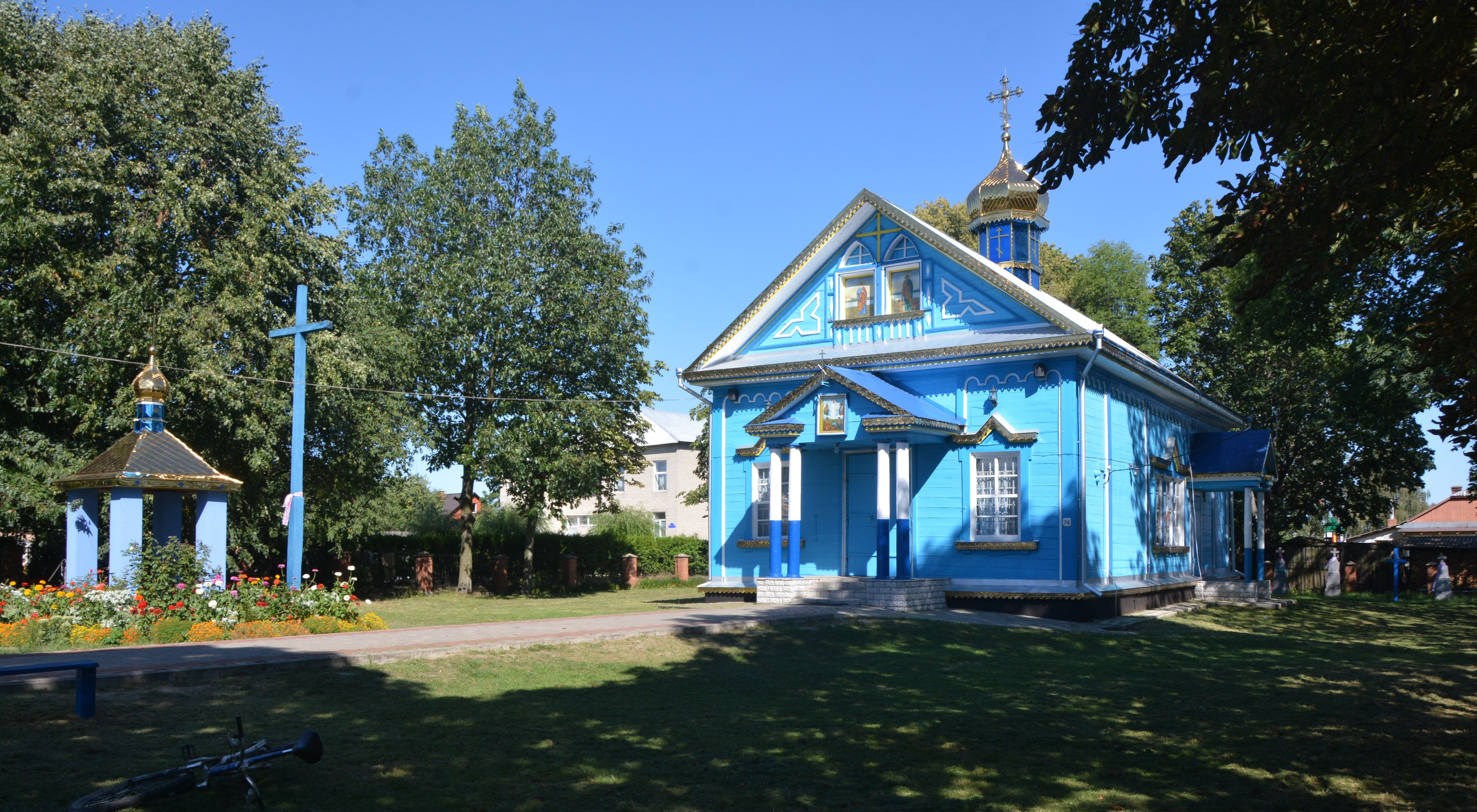
- Transfiguration Church (wooden) in Stara Vyzhivka (XVIII cent. A.D.)

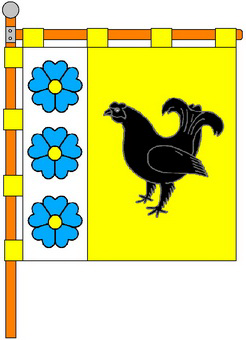
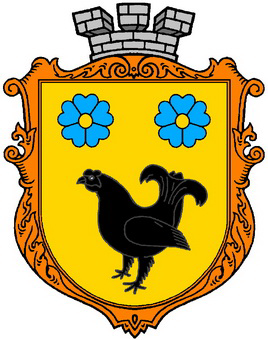
- Flag Coat of arms
- Interactive map of Stara Vyzhivka
- Location in Volyn Oblast, Ukraine Stara Vyzhivka (Ukraine)
- Coordinates: 51°26′N 24°26′E
- Country: Ukraine
- Oblast: Volyn Oblast
- Raion: Kovel Raion
- Hromada: Stara Vyzhivka settlement hromada
- First mentioned: 1508

Area
  - Total: 4.99 km^{2} (1.93 sq mi)

Population (2022)
  - Total: 5,058
  - Density: 1,010/km^{2} (2,630/sq mi)
- Time zone: UTC+2 (EET)
  - Summer (DST): UTC+3 (EEST)

Stara Vyzhivka (Ukrainian: Стара Вижівка, Polish: Wyżwa Stara) is a rural settlement in Volyn Oblast (province), located in the historic region of the Volhynia. It is an administrative seat of the Stara Vyzhivka Raion. Population: 5,058 (2022 estimate)

== History ==
Until 26 January 2024, Stara Vyzhivka was designated urban-type settlement. On this day, a new law entered into force which abolished this status, and Stara Vyzhivka became a rural settlement.

== People ==
- Yaktak (born 2005), Ukrainian singer and songwriter
- Artem Malysh (born 2000), professional football goalkeeper
- Navin Malysh (born 2003), professional football midfielder
