= Stara Vyzhivka Raion =

Former subdivision of Volyn Oblast, Ukraine

Stara Vyzhivka Raion Старовижівський район
- Raion
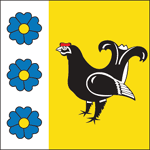
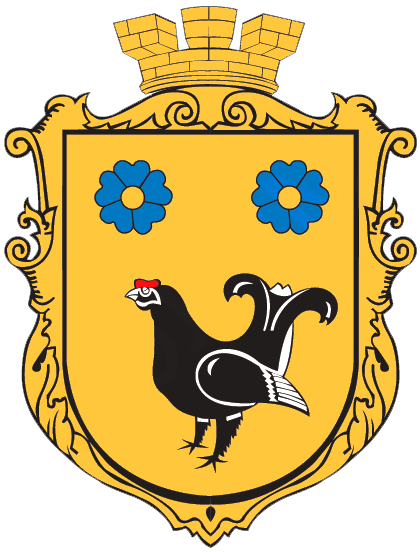
- Flag Coat of arms

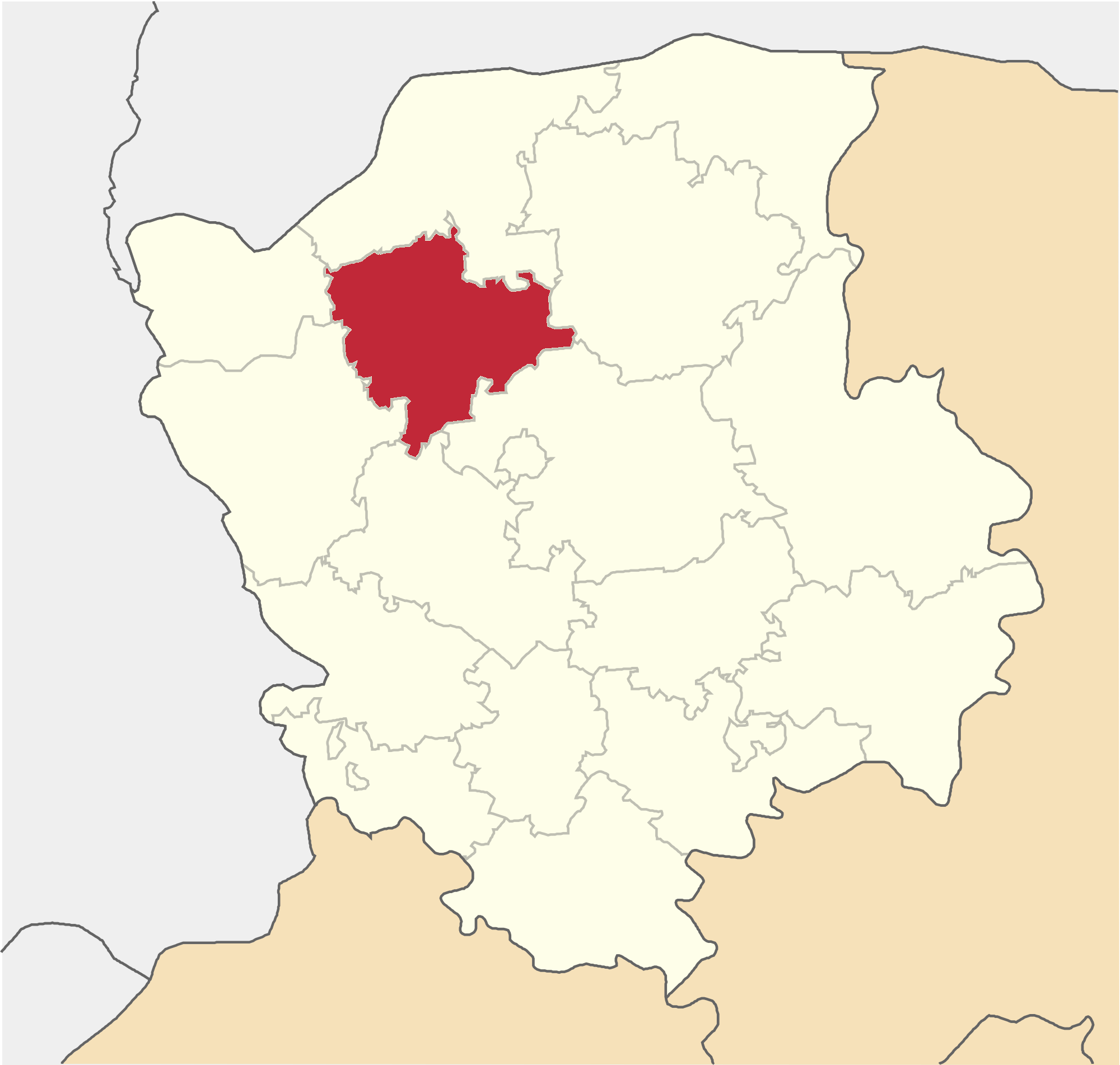
- Coordinates: 51°27′00″N 24°27′00″E
- Country: Ukraine
- Oblast: Volyn Oblast
- Established: 1966
- Disestablished: 18 July 2020
- Admin. center: Stara Vyzhivka
- Subdivisions: List: — city councils; — settlement councils; — rural councils; Number of localities: — cities; — urban-type settlements; 46 — villages; — rural settlements

Area
  - Total: 1,121 km^{2} (433 sq mi)

Population (2020)
  - Total: 29,660
  - Density: 26.46/km^{2} (68.53/sq mi)
- Time zone: UTC+02:00 (EET)
  - Summer (DST): UTC+03:00 (EEST)
- Area code: 380-3346
- Website: http://www.stvadm.gov.ua/ Starovyzhivskyi Raion

Stara Vyzhivka Raion (Ukrainian: Старовижівський район) was a raion in Volyn Oblast in western Ukraine. Its administrative center was the urban-type settlement of Stara Vyzhivka. The raion was abolished and its territory was merged into Kovel Raion on 18 July 2020 as part of the administrative reform of Ukraine, which reduced the number of raions of Volyn Oblast to four. The last estimate of the raion population was 29,660 (2020 est.)

== See also ==
- Administrative divisions of Volyn Oblast
