= Titanium Institute =

Soviet-Ukrainian research institute

Coordinates: 47°50′33″N 35°08′01″E

The State Titanium Research and Design Institute is an institute that designs non-ferrous metallurgy works and produces materials used in the manufacture of semiconductors and carbon-graphite materials within Ukraine. Institute placed in Zaporizhzhia.

Around 500 people work at the Institute.
