= Gaia (disambiguation) =

Gaia (also spelled Gaea) is a primordial deity and the personification of the Earth in Greek mythology.

Gaia or Gaea may also refer to:

== Environmentalism ==
- Gaia hypothesis, concerns the stability of Earth's natural systems
- Gaia philosophy, the concept that living organisms will improve their environment
- Gaia, the Earth in Gaianism

== People and animals ==
=== Given name ===
- Gaia (singer) (born 1997), Italian singer-songwriter
- Gaia (artist), American street artist
- Gaea Schell, pianist/composer and singer
- Gaia Germani (born 1942), Italian actress
- Gaia Cauchi (born 2002), Maltese singer
- Gaia Caforio (born 2003), Italian fencer
- Gaia Vince, British journalist, broadcaster and non-fiction author
- Gaia Weiss (born 1991), French actress and model
- Gaia Girace (born 2003), Italian actress

=== Surname ===
- Brian Gaia (born 1994), American football player
- Michele Gaia (born 1985), Italian cyclist
- Santos Gaia (born 1978), Brazilian footballer

=== Other people and animals ===
- Armin van Buuren (born 1976), DJ who uses the pseudonym Gaia
- Gaia (chimpanzee)

== Places ==
=== Earth ===
- Grantley Adams International Airport, Barbados
- Vila Nova de Gaia, a city and municipality in northern Portugal
- Gaia River, Romania
- Gaia, a village in Murgași Commune, Dolj County, Romania
- Gaià River, a river in Catalonia
- Gaià, a village in Catalonia
- Gaia (a.k.a. Sofia), one of the Echinades islands in the Ionian Sea
- Gaia, a rock climbing route at Black Rocks (Derbyshire)

=== Space ===
- Gaea (crater), on Amalthea, a moon of Jupiter
- 1184 Gaea, a minor planet in the main asteroid belt
- Gaia, the early Earth prior to its collision with Theia, that formed the Moon

== Organisations ==
- Gaia (arts venue), an arts center in Havana, Cuba
- Gaia Earth Sciences, an oilfield services company
- Gaia, Inc., formerly Gaiam, an online video subscription service
- Gaea Japan, a wrestling promotion that terminated in 2005
- GAIA locomotive, a former Argentine locomotive builder
- Gaia Movement USA, a US-based charitable organization
- Gaia Online, a social networking website
- Gaia Trafikk, a former Norwegian company
- Gaia-X, European secure data infrastructure project
- Project Gaia, a U.S. nonprofit NGO

== Transportation and vehicles ==
- Gaia spacecraft, European space mission launched in 2013
- Toyota Gaia, a multi-purpose vehicle

== Arts, entertainment, and media ==
=== Fictional elements ===
==== Characters ====
- Gaea, in the dystopian fiction novella Anthem (1937) by Ayn Rand
- Gaea, in the fictional novel series The Heroes of Olympus (2010) by Rick Riordan
- Gaia (Rome character), in the historical-drama television series Rome (2005–2007)
- Ultraman Gaia, in the tokusatsu television series of the same name (1998)
- Gaia Moore, the heroine of the teen-novel series Fearless by Francine Pascal
- Gaia (Marvel Comics)
- Gaia (Image Comics)
- Gaia (a.k.a. gaiaphage), a supernatural creature in the novel series Gone by Michael Grant
- Gaia, in the drama television series Spartacus: Gods of the Arena (2011)
- Gaia, the spirit of Earth in the animated television series Captain Planet and the Planeteers (1990–1996)
- Gaia, the spirit of Earth in the British TV series Edge of Darkness (1985)
- GAIA, fictional highly advanced A.I. character in Horizon Zero Dawn (2017)
- Gaia the Fierce Knight, a card and character in Yu-Gi-Oh! Trading Card Game

==== Fictional locations ====
- Gaea, a planet in the anime television series The Vision of Escaflowne (1996)
- Gaea, an island in the young-adult novel The Arm of the Starfish (1965) by Madeleine L'Engle
- Gaean Reach, a fictional region in space in works by Jack Vance
- Gaia (Final Fantasy VII), a fictional world from the videogame Final Fantasy VII

==== Fictional vehicles ====
- Gaia, the spaceship from the novel The Magellanic Cloud by Stanisław Lem
- A ship in Star Luster and Star Ixiom

=== Art installations ===
- Gaia (Jerram), a 2018 installation artwork by Luke Jerram
- Gaia, St Colman's Cathedral, a 2022 installation artwork by Garry Wilson and Anne Wilson

=== Films ===
- Gaia (film), 2021 South African horror thriller

=== Games ===
- Game Artificial Intelligence with Agents, an engine in Outcast (1999)
- Gaia, cancelled video game by Electronic Arts' Motive Studios
- G.A.I.A., a frequent type of technology in Bandai Namco's UGSF
  - A high-power mech weapon in Shadow Labyrinth (2025)
- Gaïa (Polaris), a 1998 supplement for the role-playing game Polaris
- Gaia Project, a board game

=== Literature ===
- Gaea trilogy, a series of science-fiction novels (1979, 1980 and 1984) by John Varley
- Gaia Gear, a series of five novels by Yoshiyuki Tomino
- GAIA (journal), an academic journal concerned with environmental and sustainability problems
- Gaia Girls, an environmental fantasy children's book series by Lee Welles
- Gaia, a fantasy comic by Oliver Knörzer and Puri Andini hosted on their Sandra and Woo website

=== Music ===
==== Albums ====
- Gaia (2002), by the Japanese rock band Janne Da Arc
- Gaia (1994), an EP by the Swedish metal band Tiamat
- Gaia (Mägo de Oz album) (2003)
- Gaia (Marilyn Crispell album) (1988)
- Gaia: One Woman's Journey, 1994, by the Australian singer Olivia Newton-John
- Gaia-Onbashira, 1998, by the Japanese New Age musician Kitarō
- GAIA, 2003, by Alan Simon
- Gaïa (Lionel Loueke album) (2015)
- GAIA, 2020, by Blank Banshee
- Gaia, a 2023 mixtape by slayr

==== Songs ====
- "Gaia (The Vultures)", by God Forbid from Earthsblood (2009)
- "Gaia", by In Hearts Wake from Earthwalker (2014)
- "Gaia", by Peter Hammill from Fireships (1993)
- "Gaia", by Kitarō from Gaia-Onbashira (1998)
- "Gaia", by James Taylor from Hourglass (1997)
- "Gaia", by King Gizzard & the Lizard Wizard from Omnium Gatherum (2022)
- "Gaea", by Pentangle from So Early in the Spring (1989)
- "Gaia", by Devin Townsend from Synchestra (2006)
- "Gaia", by Valensia from Valensia (1993)
- "Gaia", by Tiamat from Wildhoney (1994)

==== Other uses in music ====
- GAIA Chamber Music Festival, festival in Thun, Switzerland
- Roland SH-01 Gaia, a synthesizer manufactured by Roland Corporation
- Gaia (band), a Dutch trance project started by Armin van Buuren

== Other uses ==
- Gaia, the user interface of Firefox OS
- Gaia catalogues, several star catalogues produced by the Gaia space telescope

== See also ==
- Gai (disambiguation)
- Gaia (comics), several meanings
- Gaja (disambiguation)
- Gaya (disambiguation)
- Kaia (disambiguation)
- Gaian (disambiguation)
