= Gaja (disambiguation) =

Gaja is a Sanskrit word for elephant, one of the significant animals finding references in Hindu scriptures and Buddhist and Jain texts.

Gaja may also refer to:

- Gaja (name)
- Gaja (surname)
- Gaja (wine), a Piemonte wine producer
- Gaja (film), an Indian film from Karnataka
- The gaja, a piece in the board game chaturanga
- Gaja (song), a 2024 song by Justyna Steczkowska
- Tau Tauri, a quadruple star system with the primary component of the system having the proper name Gaja

== See also ==
- Gaj (disambiguation)
- Gajan (disambiguation)
- Gajendra (disambiguation)
- Gajasura (disambiguation)
- Gaja-et-Villedieu, commune in the Aude department in southern France
- Gaja-la-Selve, commune in the Aude department in southern France
