= Gaja (surname) =

Gaja is a surname. Notable people with the surname include:

- Angelo Gaja (born 1940), owner of the Gaja Winery
- Elena Gaja (born 1946), Romanian mezzo-soprano opera singer
- Gabriela Gaja (born 1972), Mexican retired butterfly swimmer
- Giorgio Gaja, Italian jurist
- Leilani Gaja (born 1985), Japanese model and actress
- Gaja (name), feminine given name
