= Gaian =

Gaian may refer to:

== Nonfiction ==
- An adherent of Gaianism
- A person who adopts technogaianism, a slant on Gaianism that embraces a symbiosis between the emergence of modern technology and ancient terrestrial evolutionary biology
- A follower of Gaia philosophy
- A shortened form of the Roman name Gaianus

== Fiction ==
- Gaian (demonym), a demonym commonly associated in science fiction with humans
- A faction the player can choose to control in the computer game Sid Meier's Alpha Centauri
- A user of the popular forum Gaia Online or the Avatar character used to represent the user
- The House of Gaian, from the Tir Alainn Trilogy by Anne Bishop

== See also ==
- Gaia (disambiguation)
