= Pinda (riceball) =

Sanskrit term for a riceball used in Hindu rituals

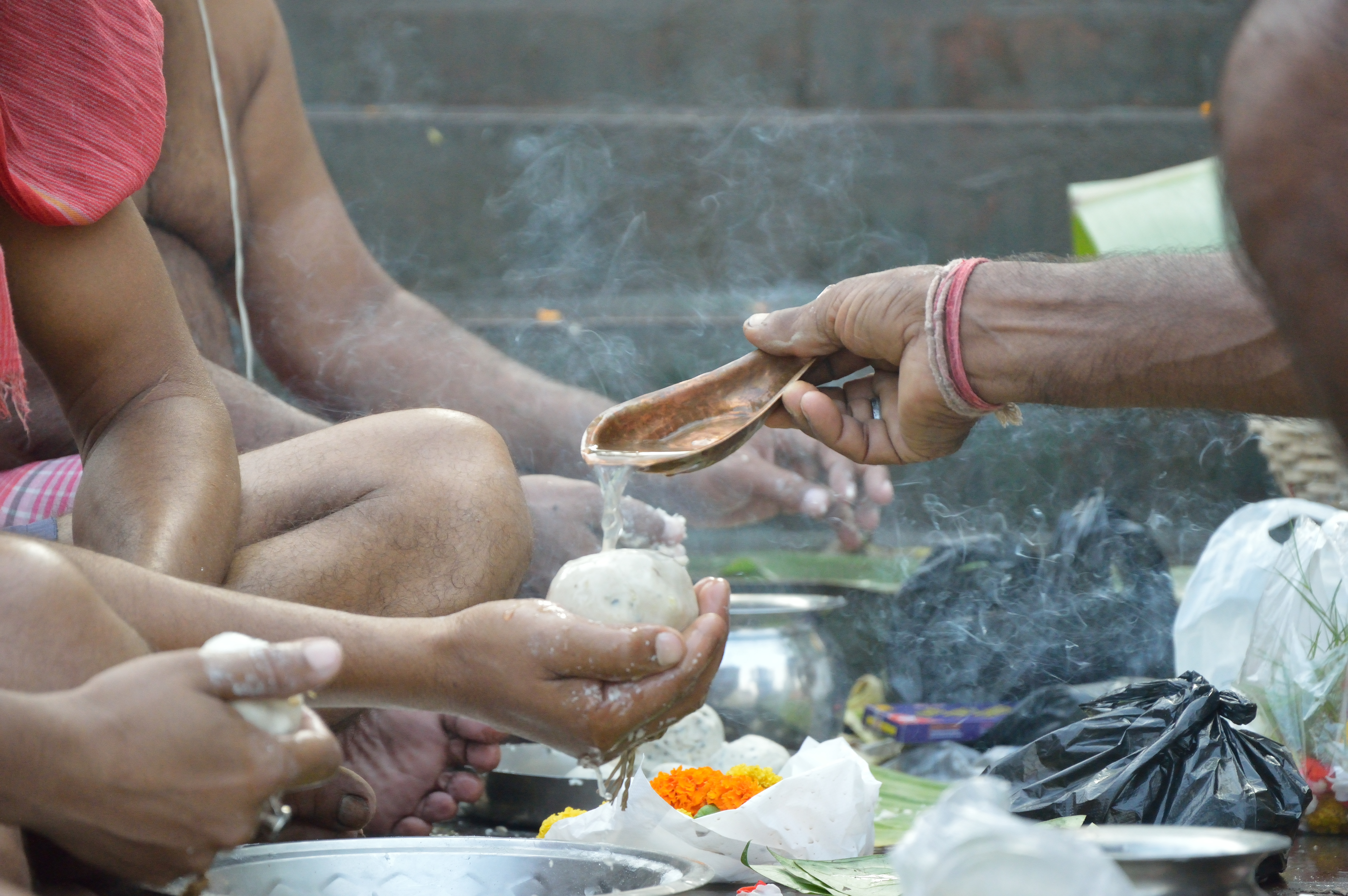
A man holding a pinda in his hand, during the pitru paksha ritual

Pinda (Sanskrit: पिण्ड, piṇḍa) are balls of cooked rice mixed with ghee and black sesame seeds offered to ancestors during Hindu funeral rites (antyesti) and ancestor worship (Śrāddha). According to the Garuda Purana, offering a pinda to a recently departed individual helps unite their soul with their ancestors. The ritual act of donating pindas is called the pinda dana.

== Etymology ==
The word pinda in Sanskrit literally means "lump" or "ball". In ritual use, it refers specifically to food balls (often of rice, barley flour, and sesame seeds) that are sanctified and offered to the departed. References to pindas occur in the Dharmashastras and Puranic literature, where they are described as a means of sustaining the departed soul.

== Ritual significance ==
In Hindu tradition, pindas symbolize the physical body of the deceased and serve as a medium through which descendants express filial duty. By offering pindas, devotees are believed to provide nourishment to their forebears and assist their souls in attaining peace. The Garuda Purana prescribes the offering of pindas as part of funeral rites, noting that without such offerings, ancestors may remain restless.

== Timing and occasions ==
Pindas are most commonly offered during shraddha ceremonies, especially in the fortnight of Pitru Paksha, when Hindus perform rites for the welfare of their ancestors. They are also offered on death anniversaries, during tithi shraddha, and in certain festivals dedicated to forebears.

== Procedure ==
The pindas are typically made of cooked rice mixed with sesame seeds and barley flour, sometimes with ghee or honey. They are shaped into balls and sanctified with mantras. The offerings are placed on leaves or directly on the ground near water, such as a riverbank or ghat. The officiating priest guides the rituals, which may include tarpana (libations of water and sesame) alongside the pindas.

== Locations and practice ==
Certain pilgrimage sites are considered especially sacred for the offering of pindas. The town of Gaya in Bihar is renowned as the foremost place for pinda-daan, attracting pilgrims from across India. Other significant sites include Haridwar, Prayagraj, Varanasi, and Kushinagar. Each of these locations has ghats and temples where pindas are ritually offered.

== Philosophical background ==
The practice is rooted in the belief that the departed exist in a subtle state and depend upon offerings from their descendants. By performing pinda-daan, the living acknowledge a continuing bond with the dead and fulfill their dharma of filial responsibility. The Matsya Purana and Vishnu Smriti emphasize that neglecting these rites is considered a sin that disrupts the spiritual journey of both ancestors and descendants.

== Regional variations ==
While the essence of the ritual is shared across Hindu communities, there are variations. In South India, pindas may be offered on banana leaves with additional food items. In Bengal, elaborate shraddha feasts accompany the offering. In Nepal, pindas are part of the annual Gokarna Aunsi rituals honoring ancestors.

== Purananuru ==
The Purananuru is a classical Tamil poetic work and traditionally the last of the Eight Anthologies (Ettuthokai) in the Sangam literature. It is a collection of 400 heroic poems about kings, wars and public life. This book has mentions of this rice ball called Pindam and is one of the common death rituals followed by Hindus of South India.

== See also ==
- Shraddha (Hinduism)
- Pitru Paksha
- Ancestor worship
- Gaya
