= Gaja (name) =

Gaja is a given name. The name Gaja comes from the Greek word "gaia" which means Earth.

Notable people with the name include:

- Gaja Alaga (1924–1988), Croatian theoretical physicist
- Gaja Dabić (c. 1780 – after 1847), duke and leading commander in the Serbian Revolution
- Gaja Grzegorzewska (born 1980), Polish novelist
- Gaja Natlačen (born 1997), Slovenian swimmer
- Gaja Prestor (born 2000), Slovenian singer

== See also ==
- Gaia (disambiguation)
- Gaya (disambiguation)
