= Magda Ianculescu =

Magda Ianculescu (30 March 1929 – 16 March 1995) was a Romanian operatic soprano and voice teacher. A leading singer in the Romanian National Opera for many years, she was known for her musicality and vocal technique. Her voice had a wide range and a timbre which critics compared to that of Maria Callas

== Biography ==
Magda Ianculescu was born in Iași, a city in the Moldavia region of Romania, and was educated at the Oltea Doamna secondary school there before entering the Bucharest Conservatory of Dramatic Art in 1947. While in the final years of her studies at the conservatory, she became a member of the Romanian National Opera company in Bucharest. She made her stage debut as Rosina in Rossini's The Barber of Seville, which became one of her signature roles. Between 1953 and 1955 she won singing competitions in Bucharest, Prague (Prague International Singing Competition 1954), and Warsaw and went on to perform not only in her native Romania but also in Belgium, Italy, France, Poland, the USSR, Czechoslovakia, Yugoslavia, and other Eastern European countries.

Her repertoire included more than 35 principal roles, ranging from Viennese operetta to contemporary Romanian opera and included Yaroslavna in Borodin's Prince Igor, Norina in Don Pasquale, Violetta in La traviata, Donna Elvira in Don Giovanni, Blondchen in The Abduction from the Seraglio, and Susanna in The Marriage of Figaro. She also made many recordings for Romanian National Radio and the Electrecord record company. Ianculescu retired from the stage in 1970 and from 1969 to 1977 was a professor at the Bucharest Conservatory of Dramatic Art where she trained many Romanian singers, including Elena Gaja. In 1971, she was awarded the Order of Cultural Merit, 2nd class. She died in Bucharest shortly before her 66th birthday.

== Sources ==
- Biblioteca Națională a Republicii Moldova. Calendar Național March 2004 pp. 112–113 (in Romanian)
- Hope-Wallace, Philip (1958)."Review: Operatic Arias" (Supraphon LPV 243). Gramophone Magazine, June 1958, p. 68
- Maftei, Ionel (2004). "O voce de neuitat – Soprana Magda Ianculescu" ("An unforgettable voice – soprano Magda Ianculescu"). Evenimentul, March 31, 2004 (in Romanian)
