= Gaianus =

Gaianus may refer to:

- Gaianus of Tyre, Roman governor of Phoenicia in 362
- Gaianus of Alexandria, Christian patriarch in 535
- Gaianus of Arabia, early 3rd century Roman-era Arab sophist, grammarian and rhetorician
