= Gaia (comics) =

Gaia or Gaea, in comics, may refer to:

- Gaia (Marvel Comics), a comic book character from Marvel Comics (an alien mutant and former member of Generation X)
- Gaea, a comic book character from Marvel Comics (Goddess of the Earth)
- Gaia (DC Comics), a character in Green Lantern comics
- Gaea (DC Comics), a character in the DC Comics (Goddess of the Earth)
- Gaia (Image Comics), a comic book character from Image Comics
- Gaia Noble, a character in the comics series Noble Causes
- My Gaia, a shōjo-ai manga comic by chuu
- Gaia Records, a publishing company in the manga Nana

== See also ==
- Gaia (disambiguation)
