= Esther Cardoso =

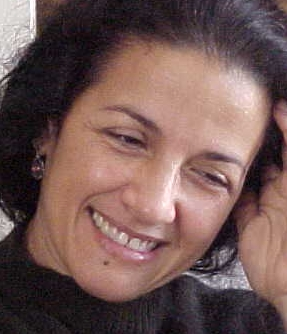
Esther Cardoso

Esther Cardoso

Esther Cardoso is a Cuban film and theater actress, producer, director and educator.

== Biography ==
Cardoso was a professor of literature at Central University of Las Villas. In 1977, she went to the Instituto Superior de Arte. She holds a doctorate in Stage Arts. Cardoso was a co-founder of two of Cuba's leading theater companies, Teatro Buendia and Argos Teatro. She has taught at the Instituto Superior de Arte and has given numerous workshops in Cuba, Spain, Argentina, Brazil, England, Germany and Australia. As a director, she has staged important shows, fusing genres and making used of diverse artistic strands.

In 1997, she co-founded Gaia, an arts center in Old Havana, dedicated to promoting creativity in theater, visual arts, filmmaking and music. The center, which also uses performance to further social and educational ends, officially opened on January 1, 2000.

To commemorate Gaia's opening, on the eve of the millennium, she co-directed A Millennium Night's Dream, a fourteen-hour show involving 84 actors, inspired by the mythical conflict between Dionysus (god of pleasure) and Pentheus (lord of reason) involving promenade performances, fire-eating, acrobatics, dance, poetry, and Cuban story-telling.

In 2005, Cardoso directed and produced, 'Las cenizas de Ruth', a radical reinterpretation of the biblical story of Ruth. In 2006, she starred in the movies 'Gozar Comer y Partir', and 'La Edad de la Peseta', The following year, she took the leading role in 'La Piel de Elisa,' the Cuban premiere of a play by Carole Frechette.

She currently runs a permanent research workshop on the art of the actor, based at Gaia.
