= Gajendra (disambiguation) =

Gajendra, meaning 'lord of elephants', is a term referring to Airavata, the elephant of Lord Indra, as believed in Hinduism.

Gajendra may also refer to:

- Gajendra Moksha, a scriptural tale about the Hindu god Vishnu rescuing an elephant
- Gajendra (1984 film), a 1984 Indian Kannada-language film
- Gajendra (2004 film), a 2004 Indian film
- Gajendra, a fictional villain in the 1967 Indian film Ram Aur Shyam, played by Pran

== See also ==
- Gaja (disambiguation)
