= Gajan =

Gajan may refer to:

== Places ==
Gajan is the name of 2 communes in France:

- Gajan, Ariège, in the Ariège department
- Gajan, Gard, in the Gard department

== People ==
- Hokie Gajan (1959–2016), an American football player and broadcaster
- Dev Gajan (1996), an American hip-hop musician

== Others ==
- Gajan (festival), a Hindu festival celebrated mostly in the Indian state of West Bengal

== See also ==
- Gaja (disambiguation)
