= Polaris (1997 role-playing game) =

French-language post-apocalyptic undersea role-playing game

Polaris (published in 1997) is a French-language post-apocalyptic undersea role-playing game written by Philippe Tessier and published by Halloween Concepts. The third edition of the game was published in 2008 by Blackbook Editions. This edition is not equivalent to the third edition that could be found at one time on the Internet.

In this universe, humankind has fled the Earth's surface, made unhabitable by some cataclysm, to a life of hardship under the seas. Human declining fertility, war and political intrigues between great powers and piracy are only examples of the difficulties humanity has to face every day. But there may be hope, as strange phenomenons, known as the Polaris effect, could be the key to humans' salvation, or final demise.

== Publications ==
- Gaïa

== Reviews ==
- Backstab (Issue 1 - Jan/Feb 1997)
- Backstab #12 (2nd edition)
- Casus Belli #102
