= Gajasura =

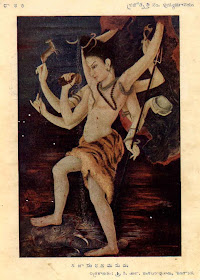
Death of Gajasura

In Hindu epics, Gajasura (Sanskrit: गजासुर, lit. 'elephant demon') is a generic name given to an asura (demon), who assumes the form of an elephant. It may refer to demons:

- the son of Mahishasura--killed by god Shiva: see Gajasurasamhara
- killed by Shiva and his head attached to his elder son and god of wisdom Ganesha: see Mythological_anecdotes_of_Ganesha#Shiva_and_Gajasura
- Gajamukhasura, defeated, and turned into a rat and made into a vahana (vehicle) by Ganesha
- killed by Rudras

== See also ==
- Gaja (disambiguation)
- Asura (disambiguation)
