= Gaianus of Arabia =

Gaianus, commonly known as Gaianus of Arabia was an early 3rd century Roman-era Arab sophist, grammarian and rhetorician. He lived during the reign of emperors Maximinus (235–238) and Gordian III (238–244)

He was born in the Roman province of Arabia Petraea. Gaianus has been described as a student of the sophist Apsines, a native of Gadara. He worked as a grammarian and rhetorician in Berytus (modern day Beirut).

Most of Gaianus' works were in the Greek language; he wrote On Construction in five books, Art of Rhetoric and Declamations.

== Sources ==
- Burckhardt, Jacob (2002). Griechische Culturgeschichte: Die Kunst (in German). C.H.BECK. p. 464.
- Ippolito, Antonella (2015). Lexicon of Greek Grammarians of Antiquity. BRILL.
- Suda, On Line. γ 9.
- Haase, Fee-Alexandra (2011). Non-Extant Rhetorical Handbooks of Rhetoricians and Sophists from the Pre Platonic Time until Late Hellenism as Literary Sources in Suda (PDF). University of Nizwa. p. 22. Archived from the original (PDF) on 2021-03-03.
