= Elena Gaja =

Romanian mezzo-soprano opera singer (born 1946)

Elena Gaja (born 26 October 1946 in Braşov, Romania) is a Romanian mezzo-soprano opera singer.

She graduated from the Ciprian Porumbescu Music Academy in Bucharest where she studied under Magda Ianculescu.

In December 1982, she won joint first prize in the Concorso Internazionale "Vincenzo Bellini" per Cantanti Lirici in Italy, becoming the first Romanian singer to have won this prize.

She was a soloist of the Romanian National Opera in Timișoara and toured throughout Europe as well as performing at the George Enescu Festival.

She retired from the stage in 1996 but continued to give concerts and opera recitals with a repertoire that includes opera arias, sacred arias, oratorio, lied to tango, zarzuelas and film music. She also taught at the Faculty of Music at the Timișoara University of the West.
