= Gaea Schell =

American jazz musician

Gaea Schell is a San Francisco-based jazz pianist/composer/flutist and singer.

== Early life ==
Schell is a native of Alberta, Canada, where she grew up playing music from an early age. During the pursuit of a classical harp degree in college, she began listening to piano greats Oscar Peterson, Bill Evans and Red Garland, among others. This inspired a move east and subsequent graduation from the jazz program at McGill University.

== Later life and career ==
Schell gained valuable experience playing with protégés of Joe Henderson, Wynton Kelly, and Ella Fitzgerald. A 1999 Canada Council for the Arts grant took Gaea to New York City where she studied with pianist Richie Beirach.

Schell made her California debut as a featured performer at the San Jose Jazz Festival and has been performing professionally as a pianist (and recently vocalist) for over ten years in many diverse musical contexts. Her experience includes everything from trio to big band to solo work to orchestral performance. She has played with Nancy King, John Stowell, Tootie Heath, Tony Dumas, Bob Sheppard, Ingrid Jensen, Bobby Watson, Dan Faehnle, Earl Palmer, and Gilbert Castellanos.
