= Gaia (arts venue) =

Art center in Havana, Cuba

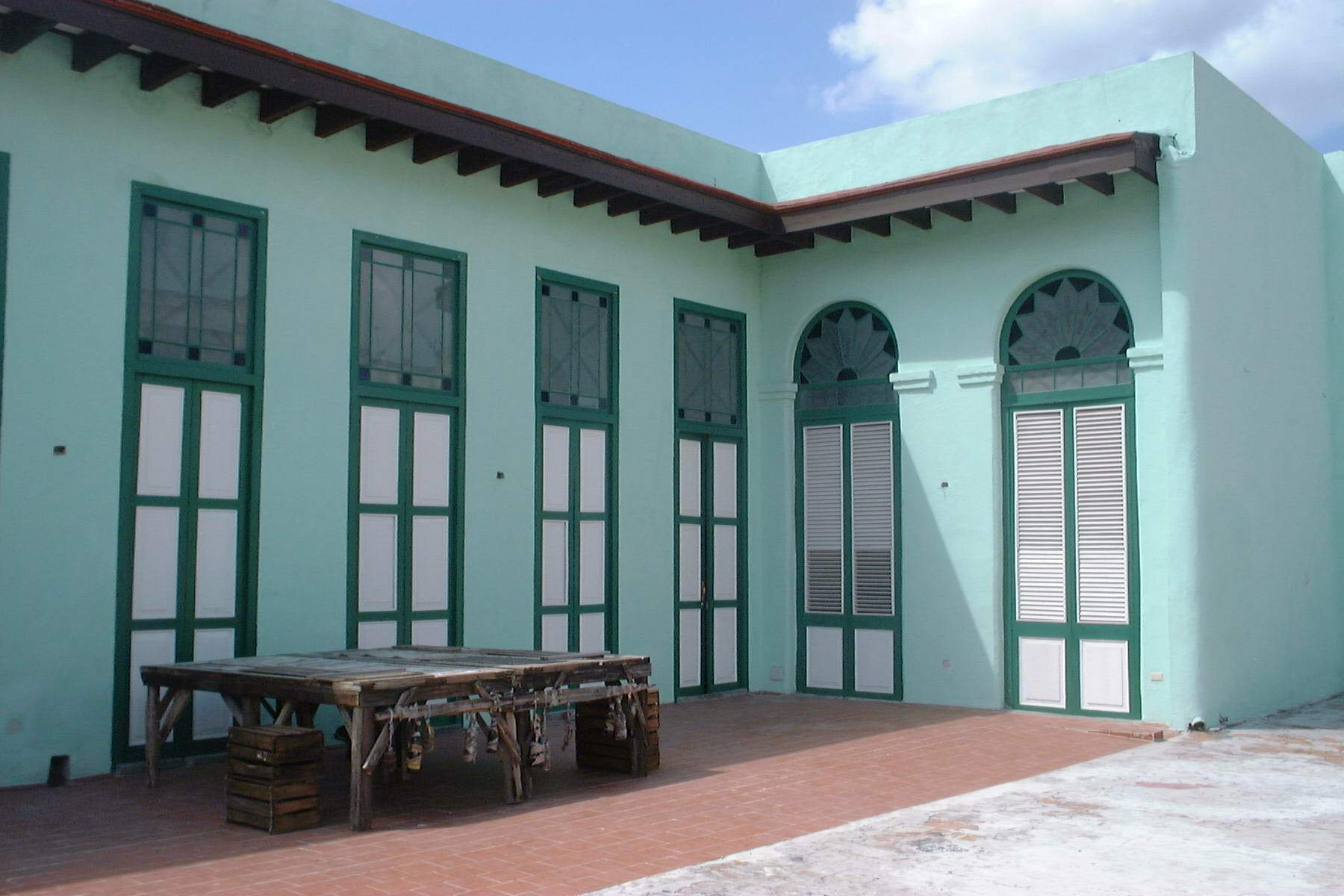
Gaia

Gaia is an arts centre in Havana, Cuba, set up on 1 January 2000, as a not-for-profit collaboration between Cuban and international artists.

The centre offers theatre, music and dance performances, workshops, programs for children and the physically disadvantaged, and exhibitions of works by young artists. Gaia Teatro, the centre's resident theatre company, has produced some interesting works: Las cenizas de Ruth was director Esther Cardoso's radical reinterpretation of the biblical story of Ruth. Los Reyes was a staging of Julio Cortázar's version of the tale of Theseus and the Minotaur. And Reciclaje used recycled items for wardrobe to explore environmental themes. In collaboration with the British Council, Gaia staged a rehearsed reading of Cooking with Elvis, by Lee Hall, directed by British director Sebastian Doggart, in the Teatro Nacional in 2000. Eight years later, on 4 October 2008, the show finally premiered, in the Sala Avellaneda at the Teatro Nacional. It was the first new British play performed in Cuba since An Inspector Calls opened in 1947.

In the court of Minos -- The Kings, Gaia

Calling on the gods -- The Kings, Gaia

Cooking with Elvis rehearsed reading, Teatro Nacional, Havana, 2000

Las Cenizas de Ruth

La Piel de Elisa

Mask performance

Mask performance

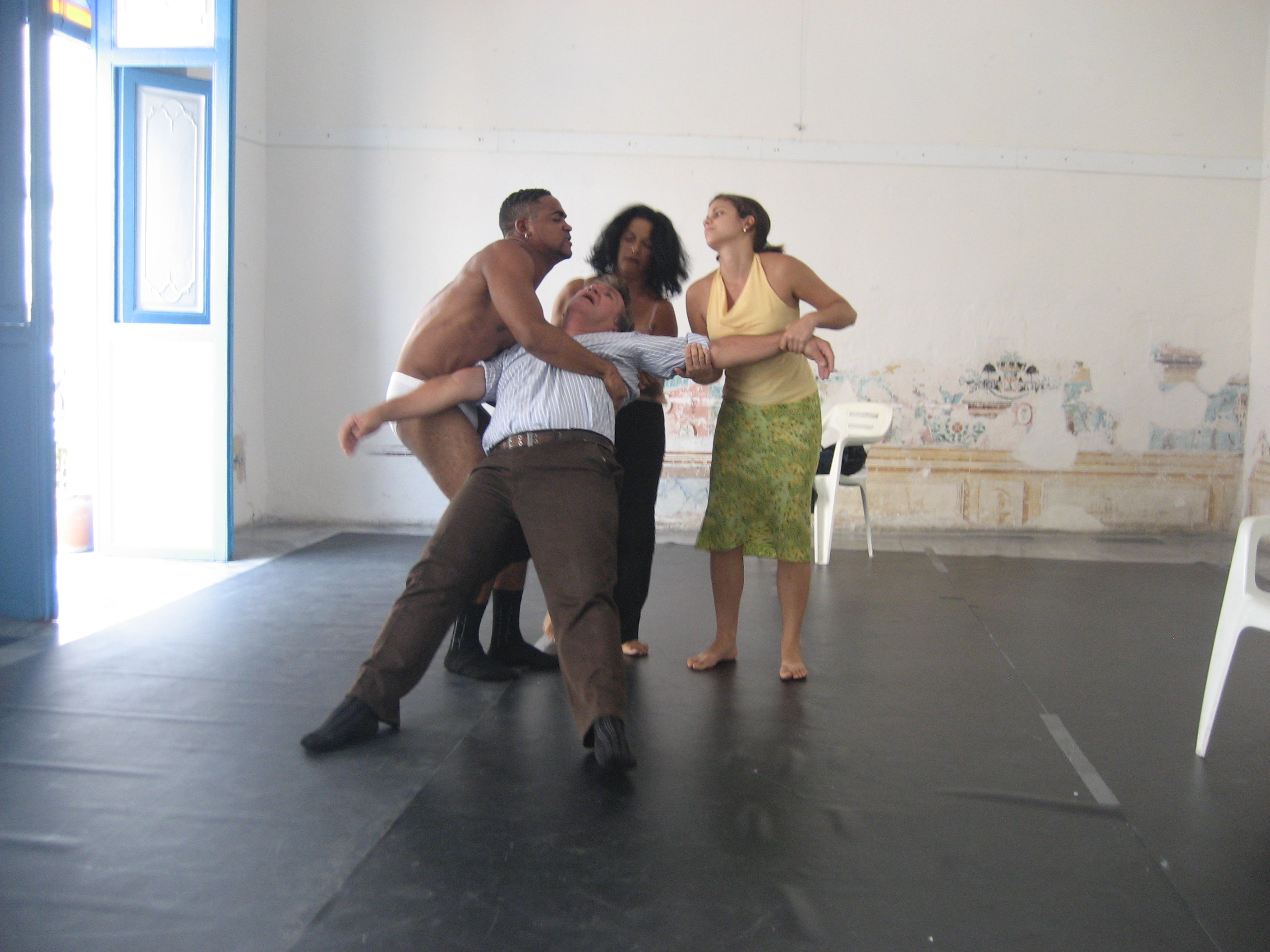
Rehearsals for Cooking with Elvis, 2007

Gaia Dance has collaborated with Cuban ballerina Viengsay Valdes on a production of Balance of Ice, a contemporary dance piece inspired by the sounds of ice sheets calving. The piece was directed by Sebastian Doggart, and featured music by Canadian composer Andrew Staniland. which can be viewed on YouTube.

On the last Saturday of every month, Gaia hosts a mask workshop for children in the morning, and, at 5pm, a unique theatrical event, called Felices Los Normales (Happy the Normal). Targeted at Cubans with HIV/AIDS – and the community surrounding them—the program is directed by inspirational activist Carlos Borbon. He and his group, Teatro Espontaneo, invite participants to come forward to tell an HIV-related story which is then enacted by a group of professional actors and musicians. The stories are moving and dramatic, and the atmosphere is electric. In December 2006, UNESCO presented the company with an award for its efforts in combating HIV/AIDS.

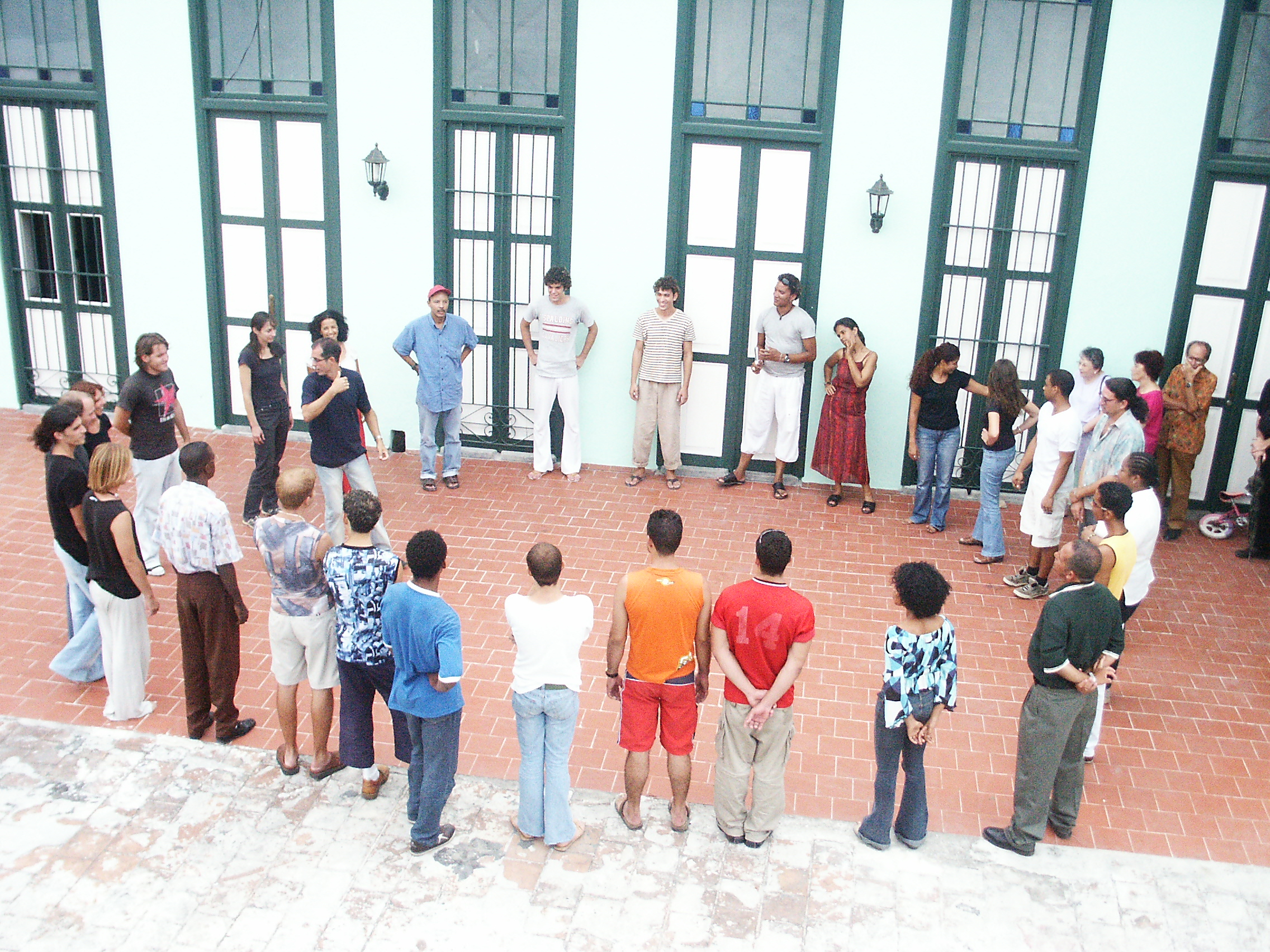
Felices Los Normales performance at Gaia

Carlos Borbon raising HIV awareness at Gaia

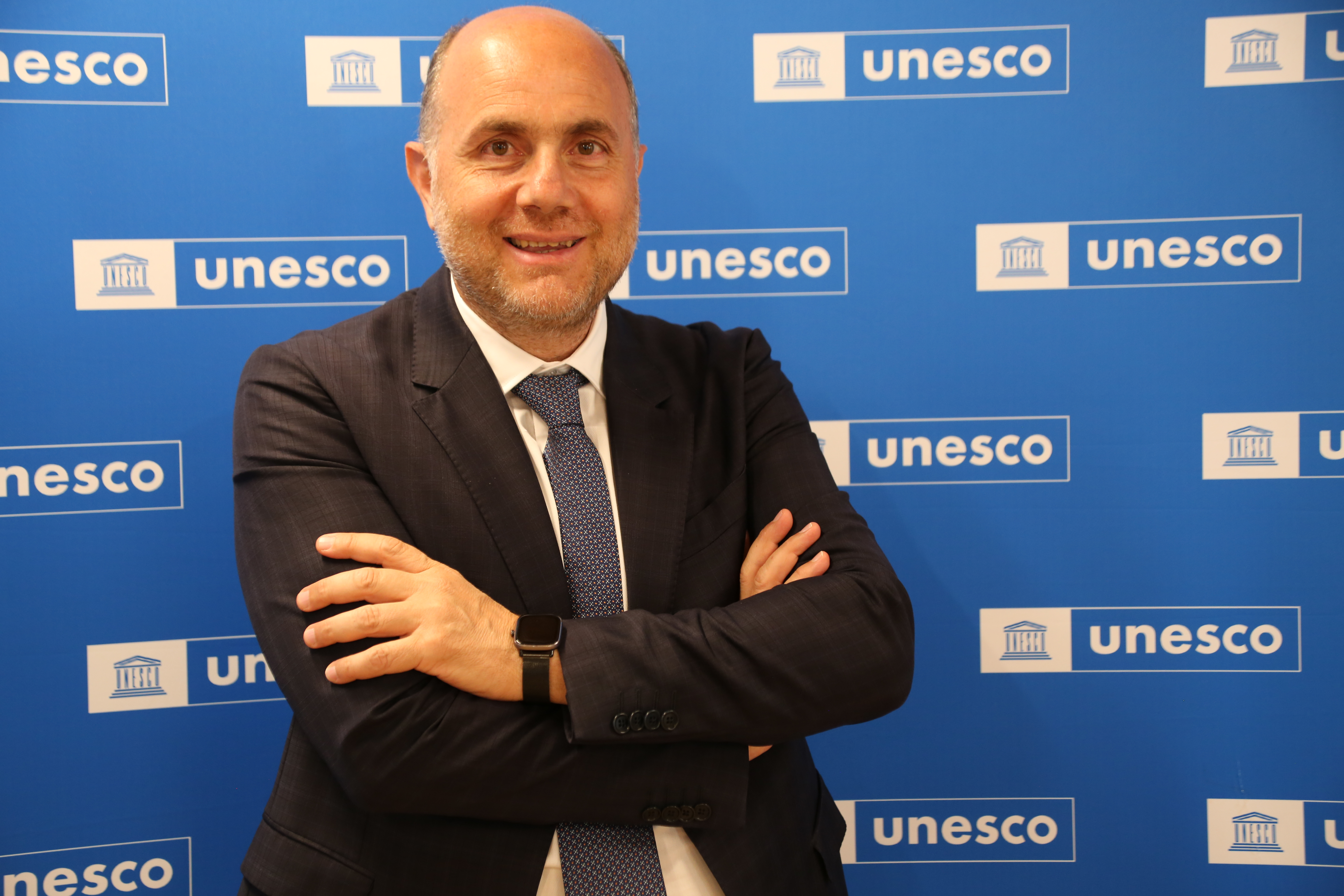
UNESCO award for Felices Los Normales

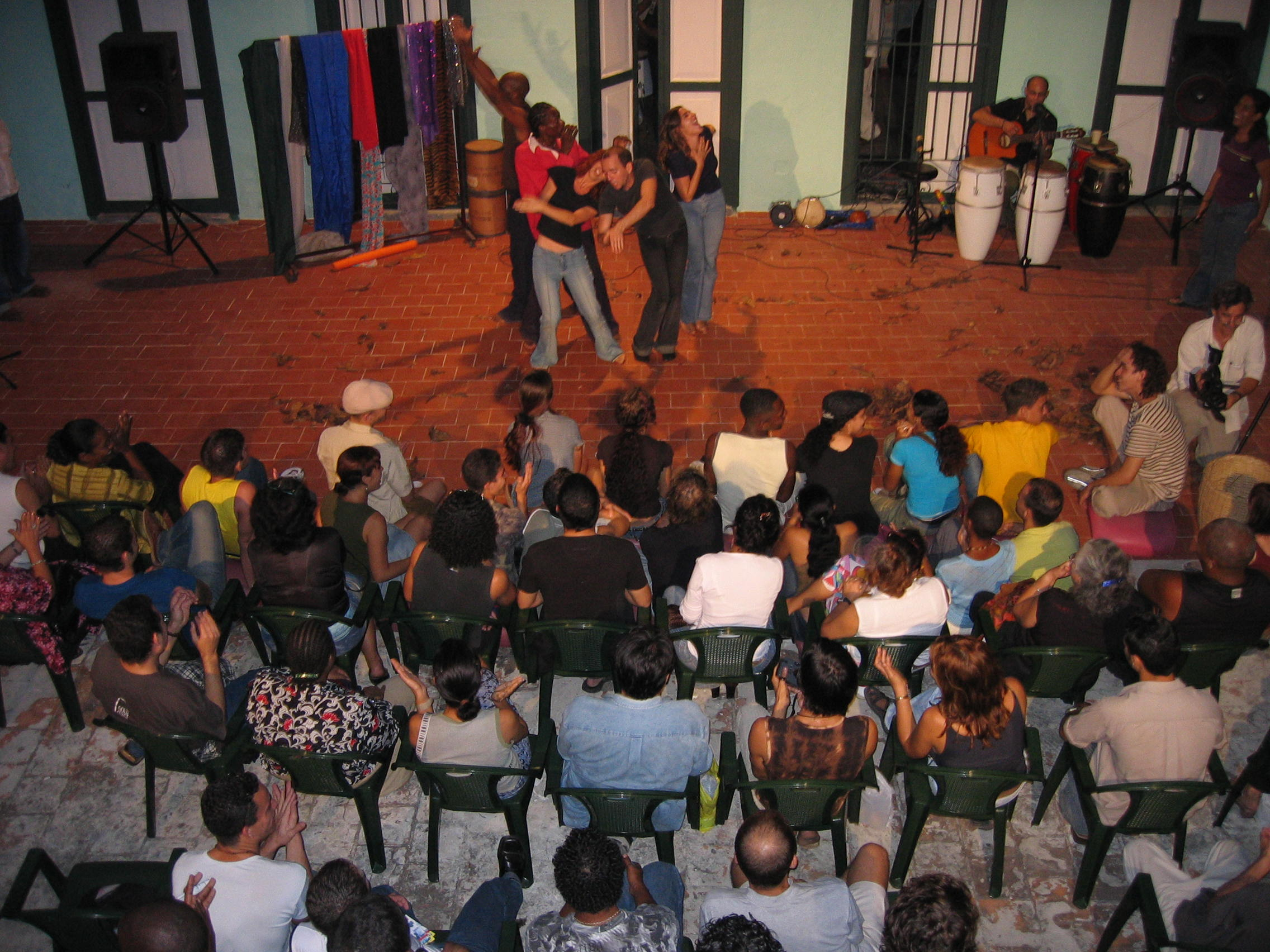
Audience watches Felices Los Normales

Gaia also has a 'Casa de Mascara', teaching the techniques and traditions of masks to children and adults, and taking promenade performances into the streets of Old Havana.

Street Performance in Old Havana

Street performance in Old Havana

Mask lesson

Mask Performance

Gaia has hosted numerous exhibitions of Cuban and international artists, including Leysis Quesada Vera, Angel Delgado, Catherine Bertola, Paul Rooney (artist) and US artist Scott Griesbach. In 2006, it put on an exhibition -- Kachita, Mango y el Jim—startlingly documenting the havoc caused by two hurricanes that flooded the city in 2005.

Installation piece for Los Reyes

Contemplation

Minos' throne

Gaia has staged performances by musicians such as Chucho Valdes, Tony Perez, Los Jovenes Clasicos del Son, Sonora Matancera, Alicia Bustamante, Gaia Jazz, and Aris Garit. It offers percussion lessons for foreign music students.

Percussion class

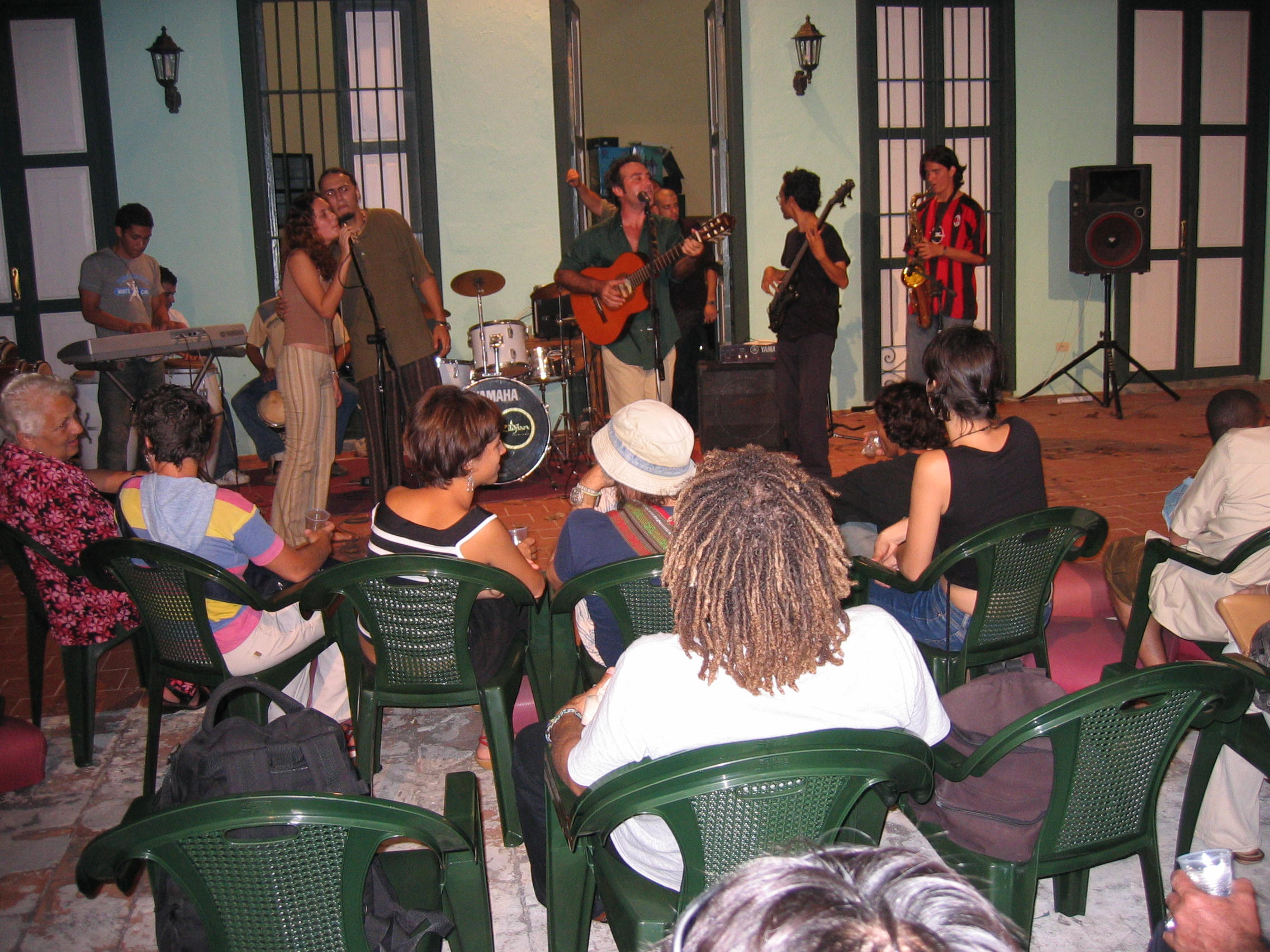
Aris Garit sings his trova

Gaia Teatro is located at Calle Brazil (Teniente Rey) #157, between Cuba y Aguiar, La Habana Vieja. In 2007, Gaia embarked on major construction work to create permanent workshops for its arts and community activities, including the building of a new semi-outdoors performance space.

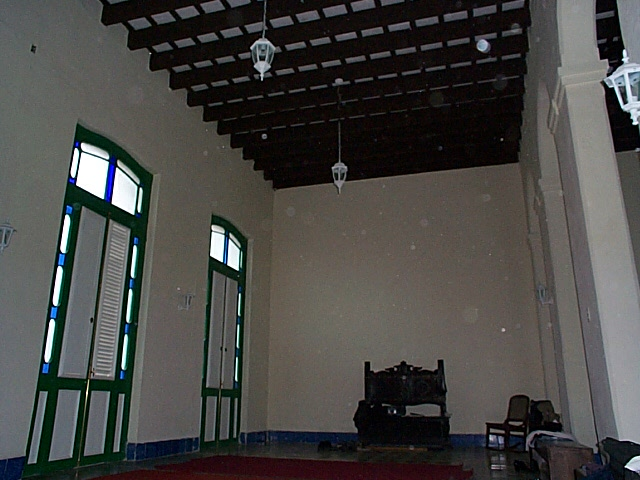
Gaia interior

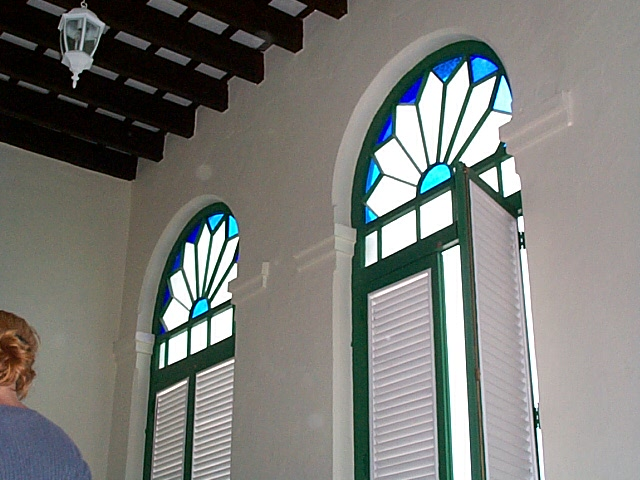
Gaia interior

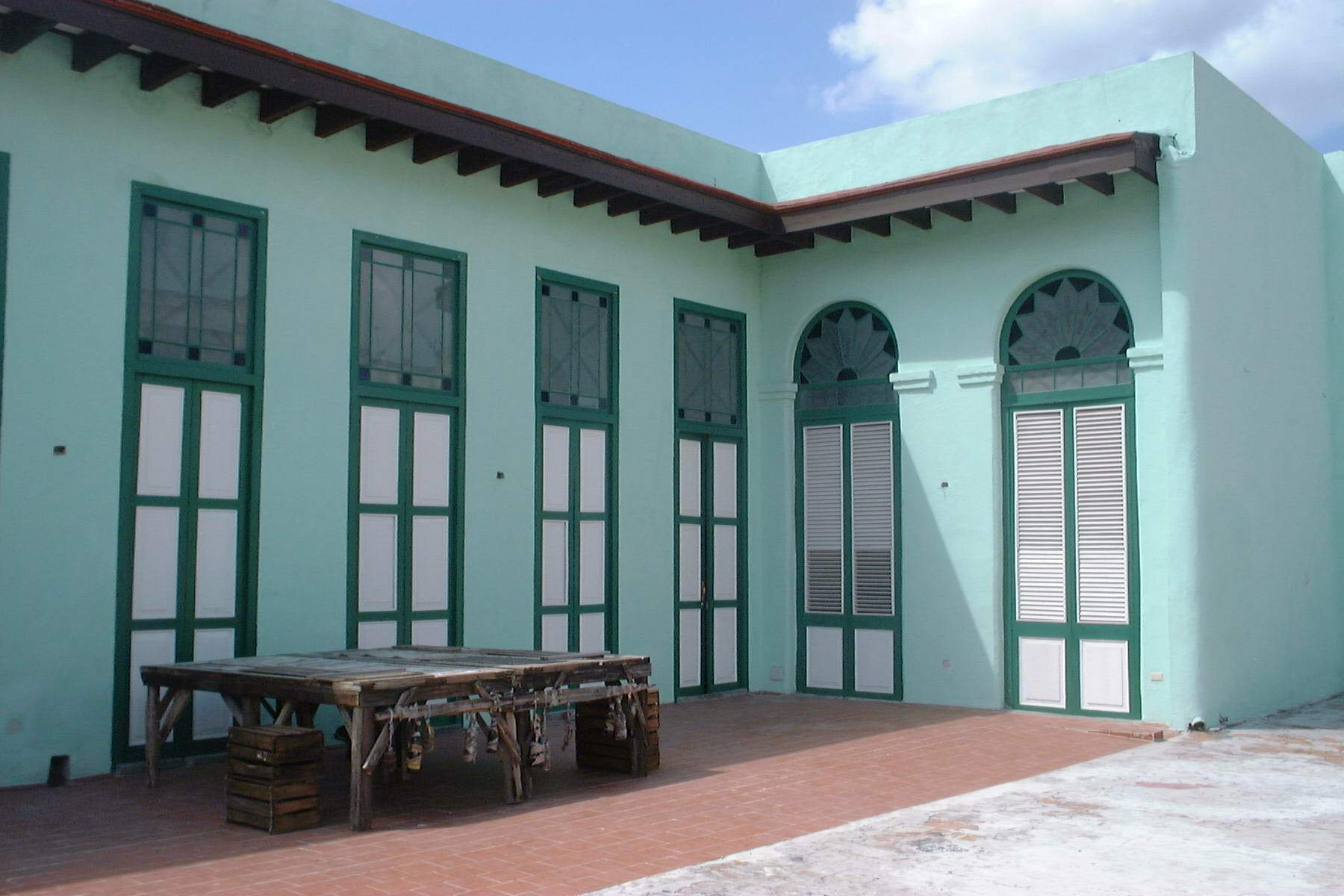
Gaia colonial doors

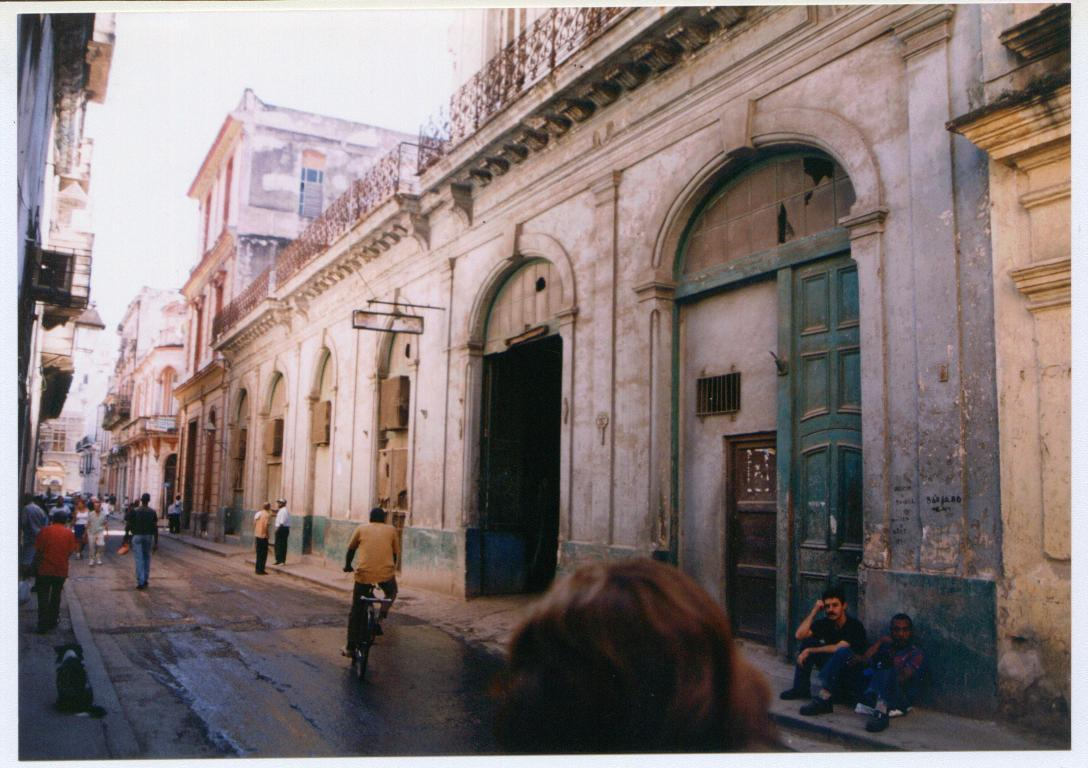
Gaia from Teniente Rey 2005

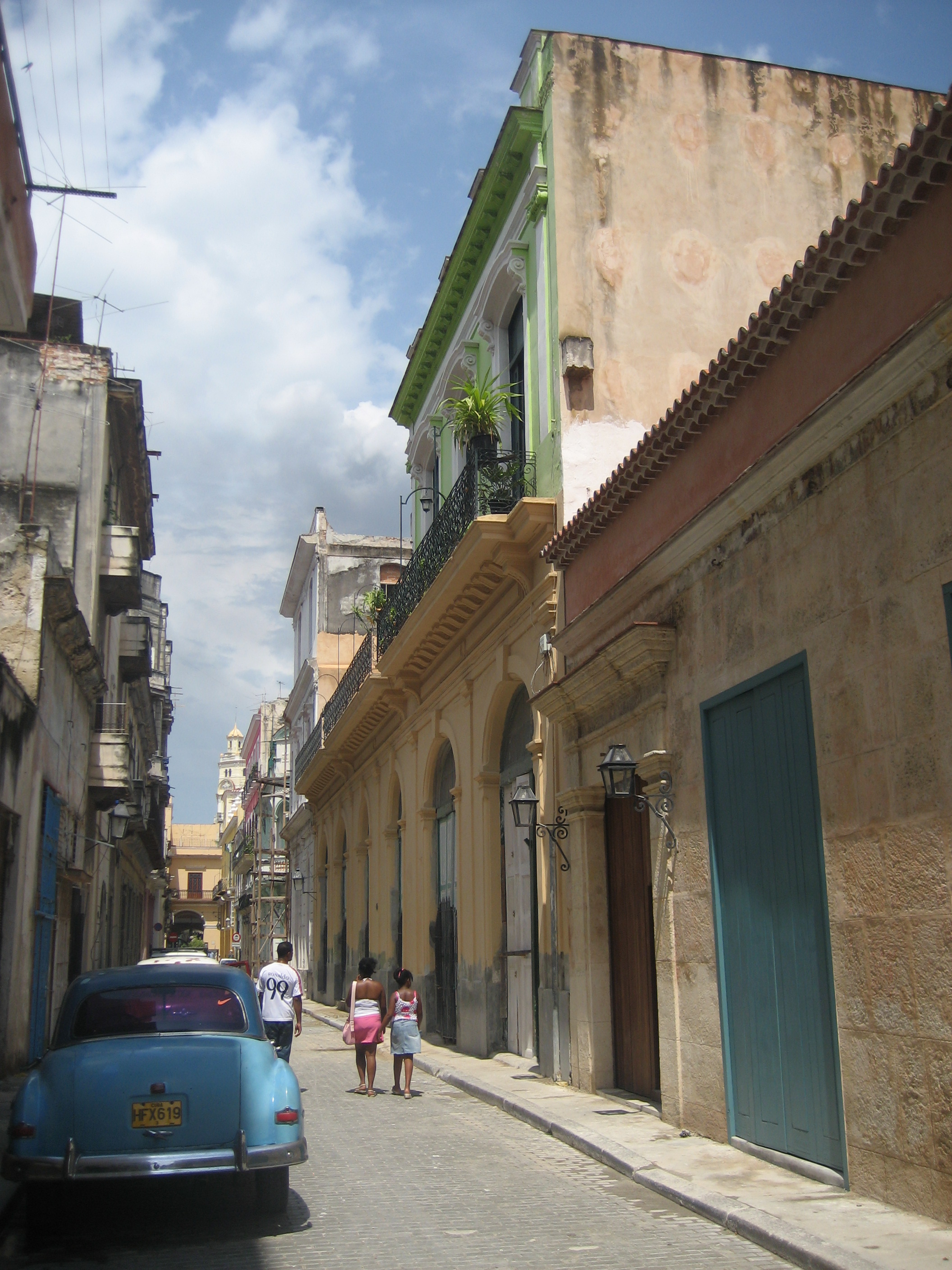
Gaia exterior 2007

Mask Workshop under construction

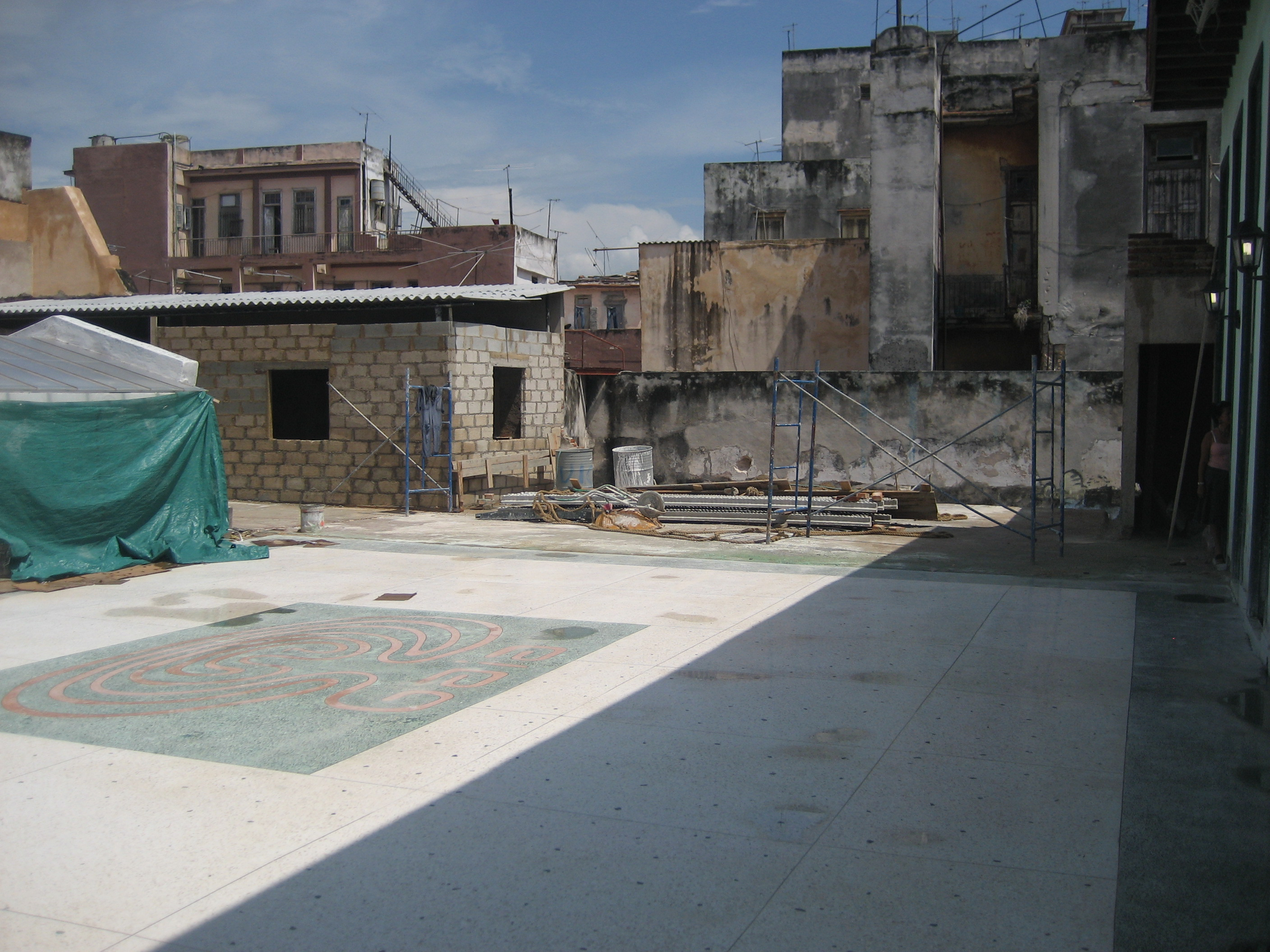
Gaia stage under construction 2007

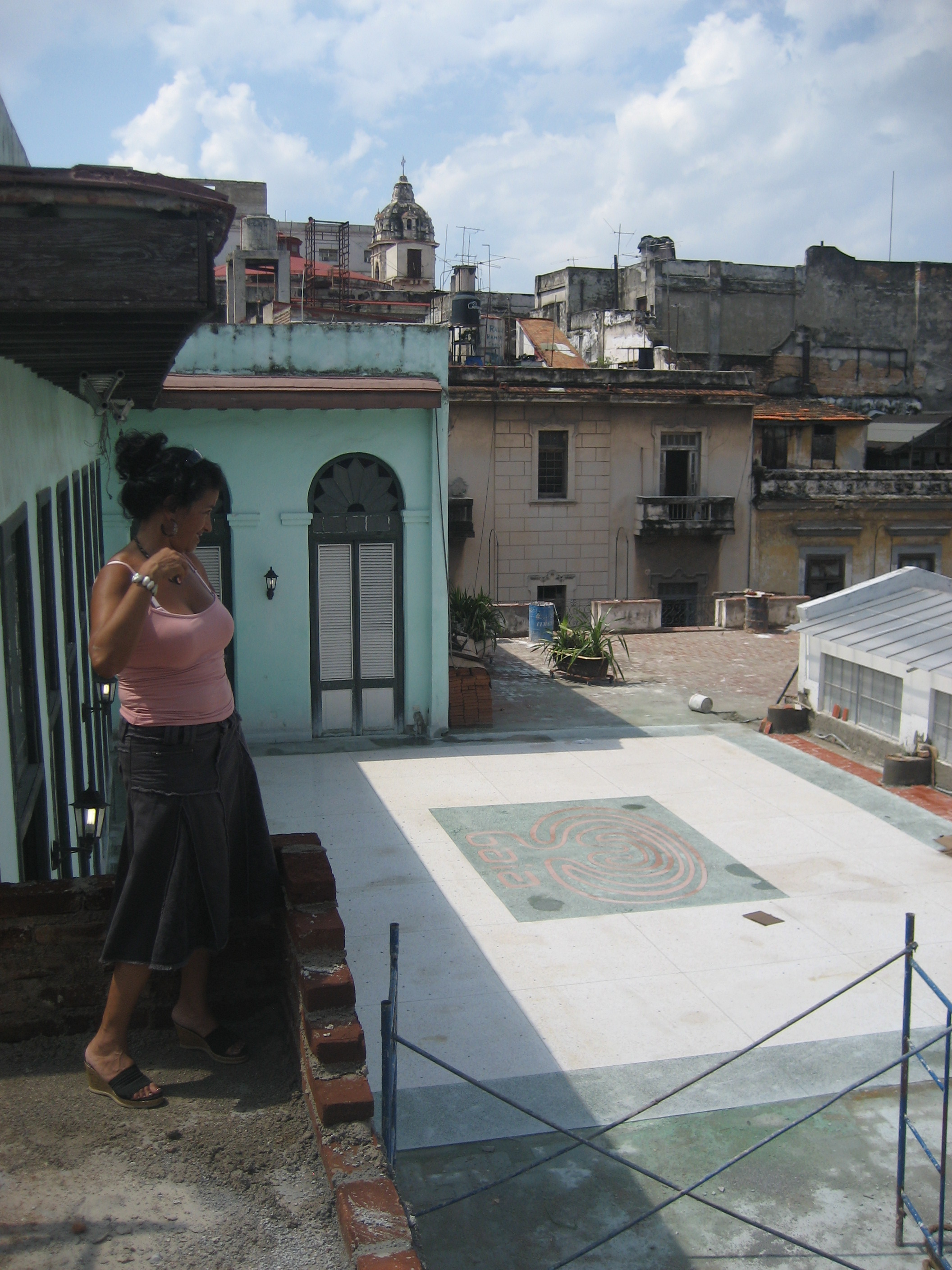
Stage under construction 2007
