= Gaja =

Sanskrit term for elephant

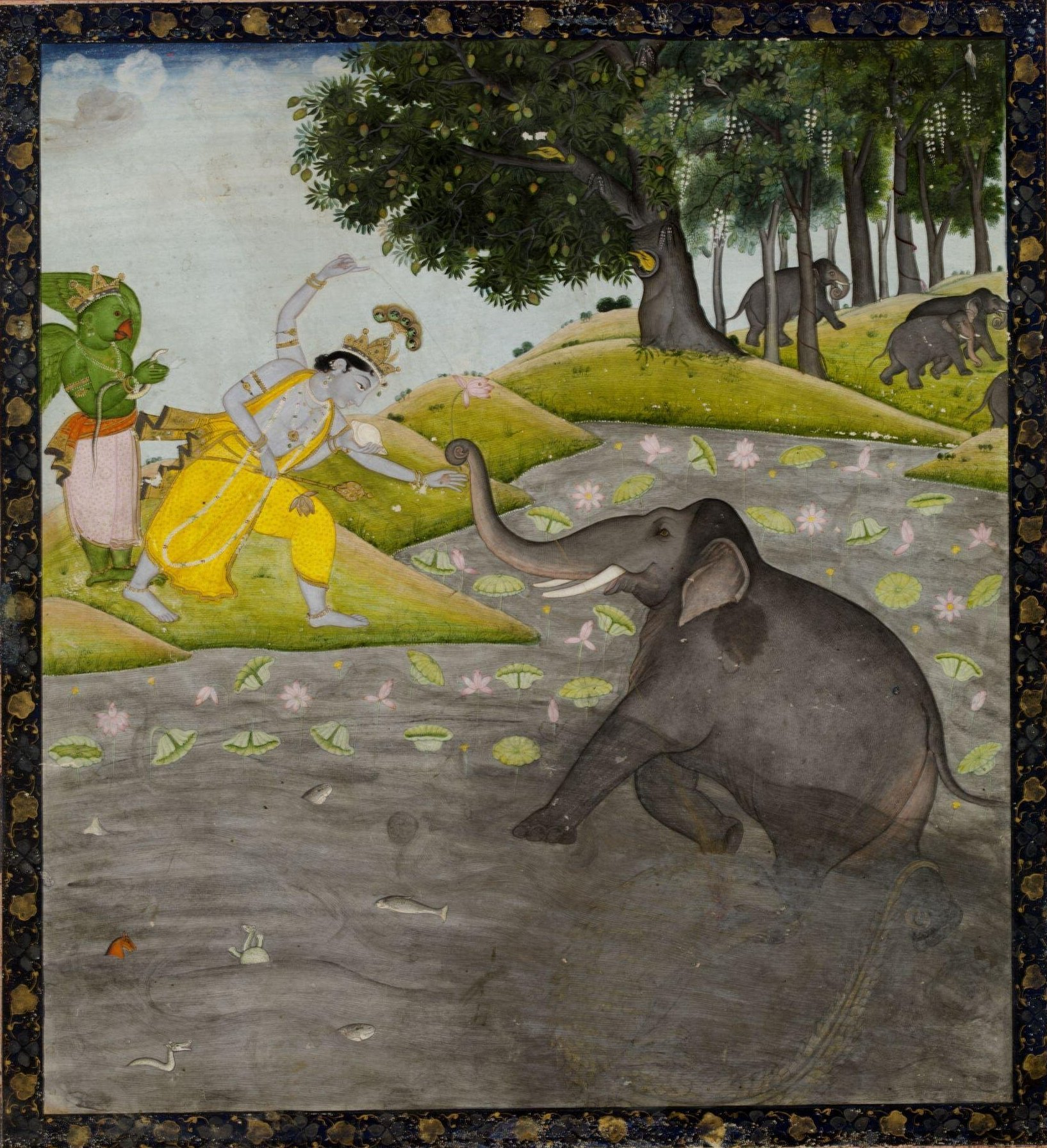
Gajendra Moksha, a Hindu legend where Vishnu saves an elephant from a crocodile

Gaja (Sanskrit: गज, lit. 'Elephant') is a Sanskrit word for elephant. It is one of the significant animals finding references in Hindu scriptures, as well as Buddhist and Jain texts.

== History ==
In the context of the history of Ancient India, the earliest depiction of gaja is found on the seals discovered at sites (like Harappa and Mohenjo Daro) of the Indus Valley civilisation (3000 BCE – 1700 BCE). Some scholars believe that by that time elephants had been tamed and domesticated, and used for peaceful and possibly for other purposes. Rigveda 8-33-8 mentions a Wild Elephant. Megasthenes, the Greek ambassador to the court of Chandragupta Maurya reports use of war elephants during warfare.

Over a period of time encompassing several centuries, elephants became an important part of Indian life and society, particularly of religious tradition, the royalty, and the aristocratic segment of the society. Capturing, taming and training of elephants developed into a specialized skill. In Ancient India, a number of treatises were written about caring and management of elephants, which included the following:

- Palakapya's Hastyayurveda dealing with the management of good health of elephants.
- Matangalila by Nilakantha

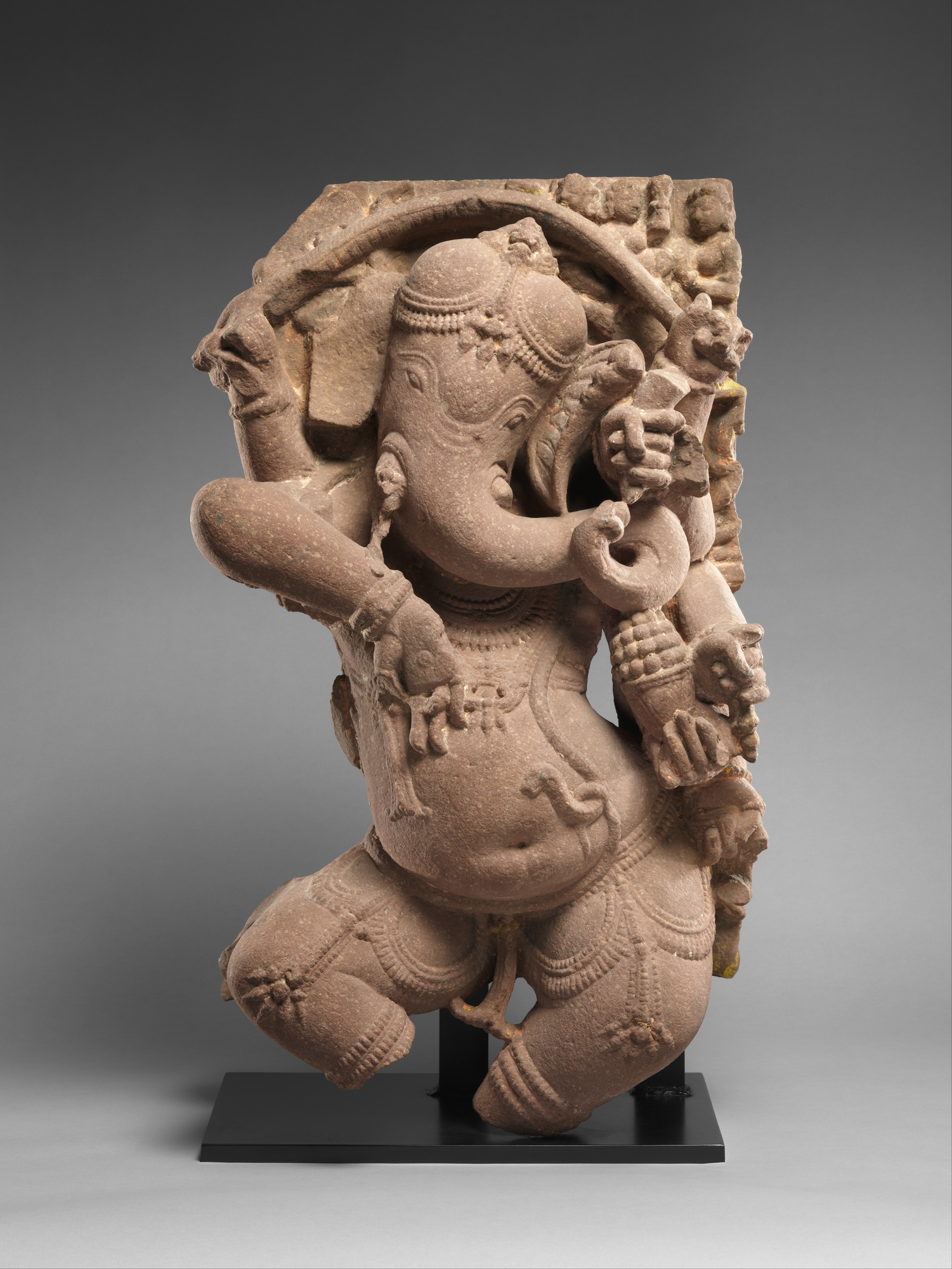
Sculpture of Ganesha, the elephant-headed deity

== Religion ==
=== Hinduism ===
Ganesha, a god with an elephant's head, has been an object of reverence and worship for more than two millennia. He is offered the epithet Gajānana (the elephant-faced one).

Gajalakshmi is a form of Lakshmi who is accompanied by elephants, representing wealth and strength.

Several deities and mythological figures have elephants as their conveyance (vahana), including Balarama, Skanda, and Aiyanar.

In the legend of the Gajendra Moksha, Vishnu saves his elephant devotee from a crocodile.

An elephant is also one of several attributes of a Chakravartin, which he is expected to own to be bestowed with the title of a universal ruler.

A legend states that Airavata, the first elephant, emerged from the churning of the ocean. There is another mythological account, which states that Brahma created elephants.

An asura called Gajasura is slain by Shiva.

=== Buddhism ===
The Buddhist tradition states that Buddha came into the womb of his mother in the form of an elephant having six tusks.

=== Jainism ===
According to Jaina tradition, each of the mother of the twenty-four tirthankaras dreamt of fourteen auspicious objects, which included an elephant.

== See also ==
- Yali
- Makara
- Vanara
