= Gaya =

Gaya may refer to:

== Geography ==
=== Czech Republic ===
- Kyjov, a town called Gaya in German and Latin

=== Guinea ===
- Gaya or Gayah, a town

=== India ===
- Gaya, India, a city in Bihar
  - Gaya Airport
- Bodh Gaya, a town in Bihar near Gaya
- Gaya district, Bihar

=== Niger ===
- Gaya, Niger, a city in the Dosso region
- Gaya Department, a department of the Dosso Region

=== Nigeria ===
- Gaya, Nigeria, a city in Kano State

=== Malaysia ===
- Pulau Gaya (Gaya Island), a sizeable Malaysian island near the coast of Sabah

=== South Korea ===
- Gaya confederacy, an ancient league of statelets on the Korean peninsula
  - Geumgwan Gaya, the ruling city-state of the Gaya confederacy during the Three Kingdoms period
- Gaya Line, a railway line serving Busan
- Gayasan National Park, a national park in South Gyeongsang

=== Spain ===
- Gayá River

== People ==
=== Forename ===
- Gaya Herrington (born 1981), Dutch econometricist, sustainability researcher and activist

=== Surname ===
- Eiji Gaya (born 1969), Japanese football player
- Kabiru Ibrahim Gaya (born 1952), Nigerian politician and architect
- Ramón Gaya (1910–2005), Spanish artist
- José Gayà (born 1995), Spanish footballer
- Juan Antonio Gaya Nuño (1913–1976) was a Spanish art historian, author, teacher, and art critic.

== Other uses ==
- Gaya (plant), a genus of plants in the family Malvaceae
- Gaya Quartet, an Azerbaijani singing group
- Gaya language, the language of the Korean Gaya confederacy
- Gaya (Seediq), law of the Seediq people
- Gaya melon, a honeydew melon cultivar

== See also ==
- Gaia (disambiguation)
- Gaja (disambiguation)
