= Brian Gaia =

American football player (born 1994)

Profile
- Position: Guard

Personal information
- Born: April 15, 1994 (age 32); Pasadena, Maryland
- Listed height: 6 ft 3 in (1.91 m)
- Listed weight: 295 lb (134 kg)

Career information
- High school: Gilman School
- College: Penn State
- NFL draft: 2017: undrafted

Brian Gaia (born April 15, 1994) is an American football guard who is currently a free agent. He played college football at Penn State. He was a captain of the team, and received an All-Big Ten honorable mention. He was part of the last recruiting class by Penn State coach, Joe Paterno. Gaia auditioned for the Cleveland Browns following the 2017 NFL draft, but was not signed to a contract.
