= Gaïa (Polaris) =

Gaïa is a 1998 role-playing game supplement published by Halloween Concept for Polaris.

== Contents ==
Gaïa is a supplement in which a full campaign is presented as a three‑act, open‑ended adventure for mid‑level player characters set after Les Foudres de l'Abîme, featuring child abductions, factional intrigue, diverse encounters, and optional guidance for character progression and integration with novels and supplements.

== Reviews ==
- Casus Belli #117
- Backstab #12
