= Lake Lubie =

Lake in Poland

- Nowa Wioska
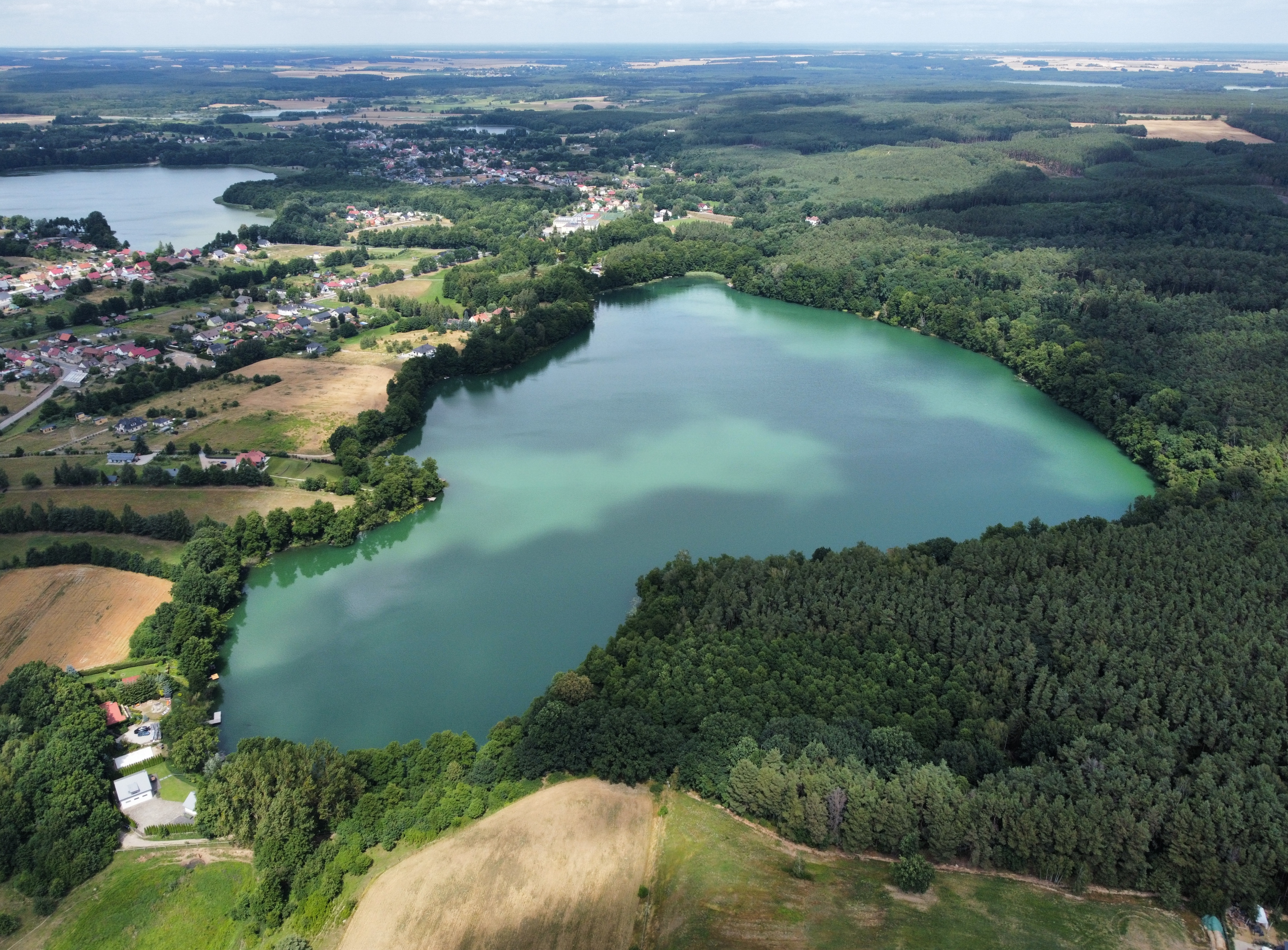
- Interactive map of Lake Lubie
- Location: Łagów Lake District, Poland
- Coordinates: 52°17′25″N 15°26′49″E
- Max. length: 0.85 kilometres (0.53 mi)
- Max. width: 0.5 kilometres (0.31 mi)
- Surface area: 0.28–0.32 square kilometres (0.11–0.12 sq mi)
- Average depth: 13 metres (43 ft)
- Max. depth: 35 metres (115 ft)
- Water volume: 3,697.1 cubic metres (130,560 cu ft)
- Shore length^{1}: 2.2 kilometres (1.4 mi)
- Surface elevation: 71.7 metres (235 ft)
- Settlements: Lubrza; Nowa Wioska
- ^{1} Shore length is not a well-defined measure.

Lake Lubie is a lake in Poland located in the Łagów Lake District, situated in the Lubusz Voivodeship, in Świebodzin County, in the Gmina Lubrza. It is the second deepest lake on average in the Lubusz Lake District. (Note: After Lake Ciecz – 19.3 m) The lake was formed as a result of the Weichselian glaciation and has a regular shoreline.

== Location ==
The lake is situated in the central part of the Łagów Lake District, within Świebodzin County, in the eastern branch of the Niesulice-Jordanów postglacial trough. Along its northern shore, there are recreational cottages belonging to the village of Lubrza, as well as a small holiday resort. The southern and southwestern shores are lined with single-family homes that are part of the village of Nowa Wioska.

== Hydronymics ==
According to German publications, until 1770, the lake was called Lüben See. After that date, its name was changed to Lieben See, which corresponded to the name of the nearby town of Liebenau. The current name was officially introduced on 17 September 1949. The National Register of Geographical Names also lists Nowa Wioska as an alternative name.

== Hydrological information ==
Lake Lubie is a natural body of water formed during the Weichselian glaciation as a result of the melting of a block of dead ice. The surface area of the lake varies between 0.28 and 0.32 km^{2} according to different sources. Depending on the season, the water level fluctuates by about 0.8 m. The average depth of the lake is 13 m, while the maximum depth reaches 35 m. The volume of water in the lake is 3,697,100 m^{3}. The lake's maximum length is 850 m, and its maximum width is 500 m.

The lake's direct drainage basin is small, measuring 3.8 km^{2}. A small stream flows into the lake from the south, periodically feeding fish ponds located on the southern shore of the lake. The lake's waters are supplied by both groundwater and surface runoff from the drainage basin. The outflow of water from the lake occurs towards the north through a canal that connects with the Niesulice Canal and subsequently with Lake Goszcza.

According to the Hydrographic Division Map of Poland, the lake lies within the drainage basin of the seventh level, the Niesulice Canal to Lake Goszcza.

== Nature ==
The eastern shore of the lake directly abuts the edge of the postglacial trough. This area, known as the "Lubie Hills", features an elevation difference of up to 56 m between the water's surface and the highest point of the upland. The eastern shore is also marked by numerous erosional valleys. The steep eastern shore is covered with stands of oak, beech, birch, and hornbeam trees. The northern, more gently sloping shore is covered with forests of alder, ash, and bird cherry trees. According to natural-forest regionalization, the lake is located in the Łagów Lake District mesoregion.

Due to its considerable depth, the lake has a poorly developed aquatic vegetation zone. The gentle northern shores feature a belt of aquatic plants up to 20 m wide. On the eastern and southern sides, the vegetation belt is at most 2 m wide. Given the significant water clarity, plants can grow up to a depth of 7 m. Aquatic and shoreline plants include common reed, lakeshore bulrush, white waterlily, water soldier, yellow water-lily, shining pondweed, coontail, smooth stonewort, and Canadian waterweed.

The dominant fish species in Lake Lubie include vendace, bream, European eel, common roach, northern pike, white bream, and tench. Other species found in the lake are European perch, Salmo trutta m. lacustris, Eurasian carp, zander, and burbot.

== Water quality and environmental protection ==
According to research conducted in 1983, the water conductivity of Lake Lubie was 130 μS/cm, the pH level was 7.9, the oxygen demand was 3.5 mgO_{2}/l, the calcium content was 41.7 mg/l, the sulfate content was 34.0 mg/l, and the chloride content was 10.8 mg/l.

In studies conducted in 1998, the waters of Lake Lubie were classified as Class III in terms of purity. This classification was due to high concentrations of nitrogen, phosphorus, chlorophyll, and a completely deoxygenated hypolimnion. Additionally, the lake's waters had a very high mineral salt content, negatively impacting the assessment of the lake's purity.

Studies performed in 2003 confirmed the earlier results, but there was a slight improvement in the indicators, leading to the lake being classified as Class II in terms of purity. During the summer, water transparency was measured at 4.1 m, corresponding to Class I purity. It was also determined that Lake Lubie is resistant to degradation, due to its high average depth, limited annual water exchange, and the predominance of forests in the direct drainage basin.

Wastewater from the settlements around the lake is treated at the sewage treatment plant in Lubrza. Bacteriological studies have indicated that the sanitary condition of the lake is satisfactory and has been classified as Class I in terms of purity.

The lake is situated within the planned nature park called the Ołobok and Paklica Trough. The main objective of this proposed area is to protect the natural ecological corridor along the mentioned postglacial trough.

== Development ==
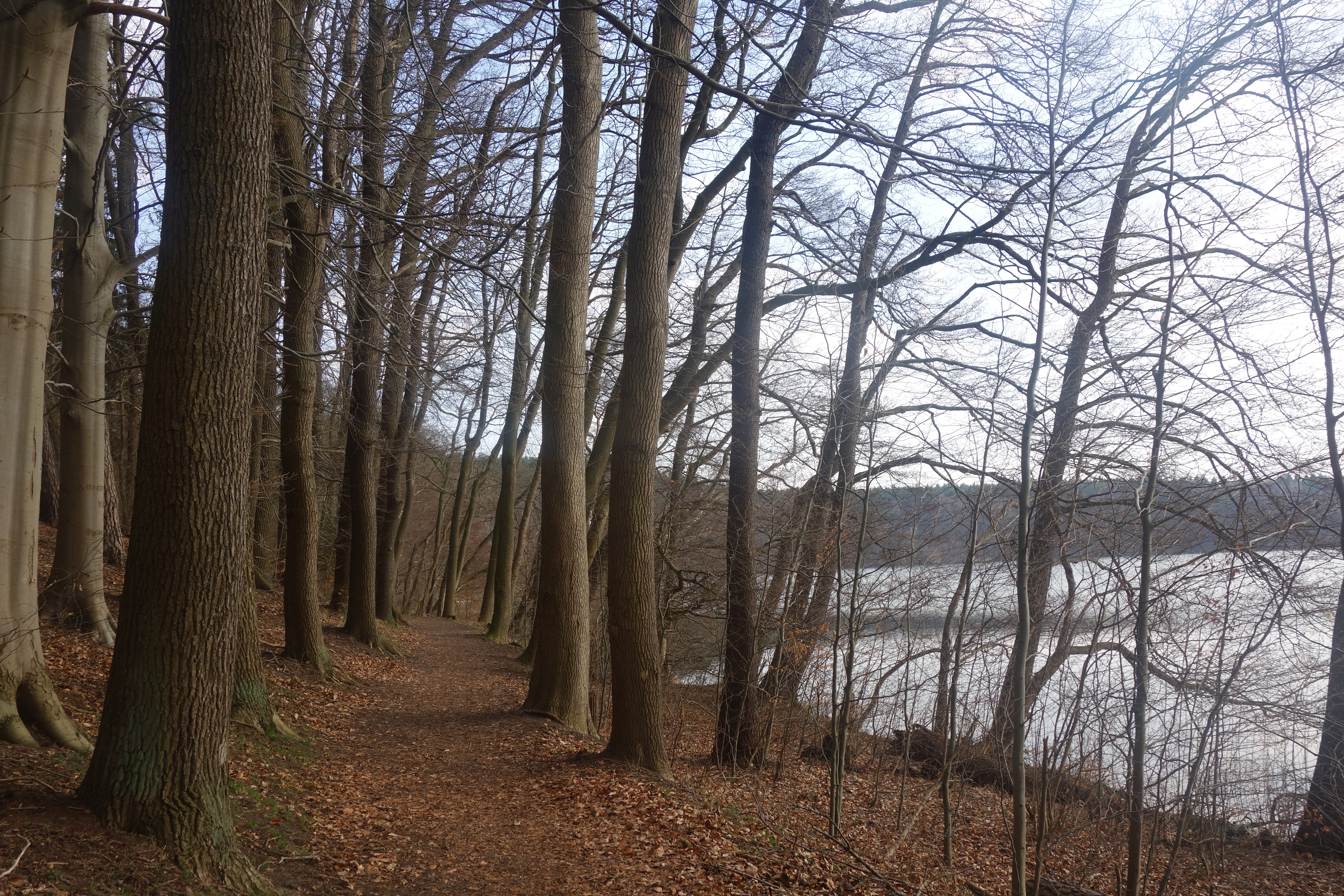
Nenufarów hiking and biking trail at Lake Lubie

Lake Lubie serves as a destination for tourism, recreation, fishing, and commercial fishing. The waters of the lake are managed by the Regional Water Management Authority in Poznań, which has established a fishing area that includes the waters of the Paklica river and several lakes, including Paklicko Wielkie, Goszcza, Lubrza, and Lubie (fishing area of Lake Paklicko Wielkie on the Paklica river – No. 2). The Polish Angling Association's Zielona Góra District conducts extensive fishery management in the lake. The lake is regularly stocked with fish, and in the early 21st century, the average fish catch per hectare of water was 29 kg.

At the northern end of the lake, there is a holiday resort and numerous recreational cottages. Due to the high water transparency, Lake Lubie is used by divers for training camps. However, there are no officially registered swimming areas by the lake.

Lake Lubie is surrounded by the Nenufarów Trail, a hiking and biking path. Along the shore, there are gazebos and smaller rest areas, allowing for breaks during walks or bike rides. On the northwest side of the lake, a canal leads to Lake Goszcza, connecting both lakes with the Lubrza Water Trail.

== Legends ==
Lake Lubie features in a legend that is retold annually during the Night of the Water Lilies (Polish: Noc Nenufarów). The legend narrates the story of the founding of the villages Nowa Wioska and Lubrza, and it centers around a Slavic fisherman's daughter named Lubrzana.
