= Lake Goszcza =

Lake in Lubusz Voivodeship, Poland

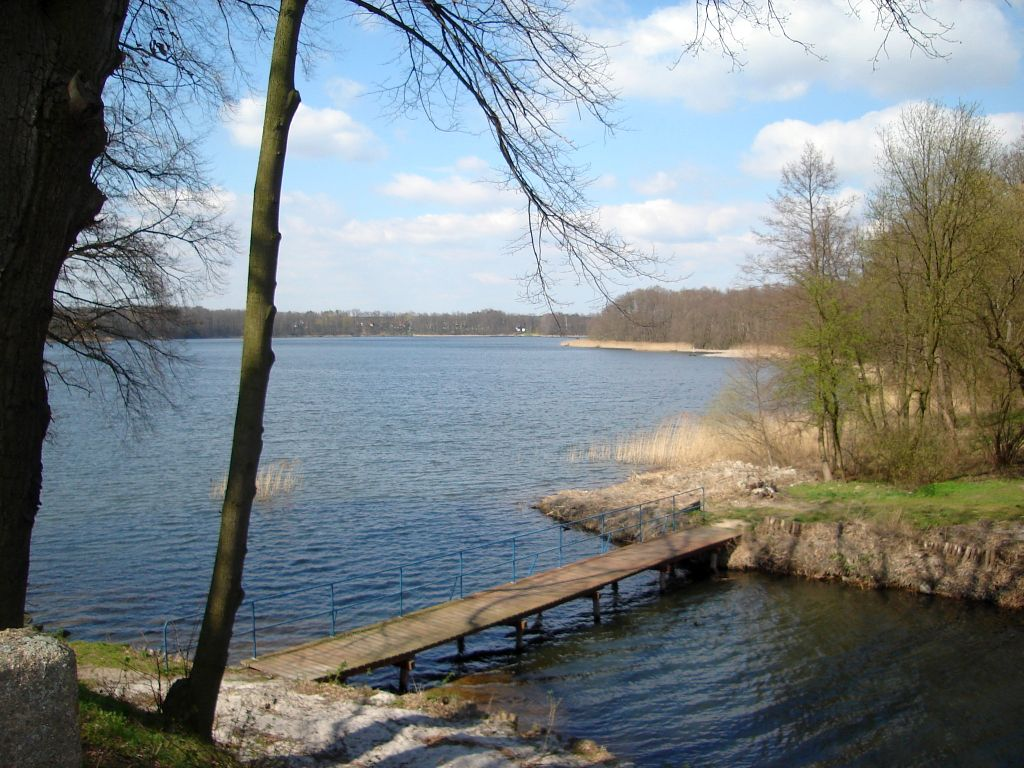
- View of Lake Goszcza from Nowa Wioska
- Interactive map of Lake Goszcza
- Location: Lubusz Voivodeship
- Coordinates: 52°18′5″N 15°26′1″E
- Type: Ribbon lake
- Part of: Łagów Lakeland
- Primary inflows: Niesulice Canal (Paklica)
- Primary outflows: Niesulice Canal (Paklica)
- Basin countries: Poland
- Max. length: 1,140 m (3,740 ft)
- Max. width: 650 m (2,130 ft)
- Surface area: 48–55 ha (120–140 acres)
- Average depth: 7.7 m (25 ft)
- Max. depth: 20.2 m (66 ft)
- Water volume: 3,692,000 m^{3} (130,400,000 cu ft)
- Shore length^{1}: 2,950 m (9,680 ft)
- Surface elevation: 71 m (233 ft)
- Settlements: Lubrza, Nowa Wioska
- ^{1} Shore length is not a well-defined measure.

Lake Goszcza is a glacial lake in Poland, located in the Lubusz Voivodeship, in Świebodzin County, in Gmina Lubrza. The lake lies within the Jordanowo-Niesulice tunnel valley. According to various sources, its surface area ranges from 48 to 55 hectares. The average depth of the reservoir is 7.7 m, with a maximum depth of 20.2 m. The lake is situated within the nature park known as the "Paklica and Ołobok Glacial Valley".

== Location ==
The lake is situated in the central part of the Łagów Lakeland, a mesoregion of the larger Lubusz Lakeland. It lies within Świebodzin County, in the eastern branch of the Jordanowo-Niesulice tunnel valley. Goszcza is one of several lakes in this valley, which are remnants of a fossil reservoir that occupied the valley following the retreat of the last continental ice sheet. According to natural-forestry regionalization, the lake is located within the mesoregion of the Łagów Lakeland. The northern, eastern, and western shores are bordered by buildings of the villages of Lubrza and Nowa Wioska.

The Niesulice Canal flows through the lake, draining the bottom of the tunnel valley. Water outflows from the lake in a northerly direction. Depending on the source, the watercourse carrying these waters is referred to as the Rakownik river, the Paklica river, or the Niesulice Canal. The reservoir is fed by both groundwater and surface runoff from its catchment area. Goszcza is a flow-through lake with an annual water exchange rate of approximately 220%. According to the Hydrographic Division Map of Poland, it belongs to the seventh-level catchment area known as the Goszcza Lake Catchment (MPHP identifier: 1878813).

== Hydronymics ==
The lake is first documented in historical sources in 1791 under the name Gast See, subsequently recorded as Gastsee (1802), Gase See (1802), and again Gast See (1809, 1817, 1907, 1938). The current official name, Goszcza, was established on 17 September 1949.

== Morphometry ==
According to data from the Stanisław Sakowicz Inland Fisheries Institute, the surface area of the lake's water mirror is 48 hectares. In contrast, Adam Choiński, using planimetry on maps at a scale of 1:50,000, determined the area to be 55 hectares. The area of the uniform water body is 52 hectares.

The average depth of the reservoir is 7.7 m, with a maximum depth of 20.2 m. The lake's volume is 3,692,000 m³. Its maximum length measures 1,140 m, and the maximum width is 650 m. The shoreline length is 2,950 m.

According to Atlas jezior Polski (Atlas of Polish Lakes), the water surface lies at an elevation of 71 m above sea level. However, data from the digital terrain model available on Geoportal indicate an elevation of 70.2 m above sea level. The direct drainage basin of the lake covers 62.7 km².

== Management ==
The lake (code PLLW10373) is a uniform water body administered by the Regional Water Management Board in Poznań. The board has designated a fishing district encompassing the Paklica river and several lakes, including Paklicko Wielkie, Goszcza, Lubrza and Lubie (fishing district of Paklicko Wielkie lake on the Paklica river – No. 2). Fisheries management is overseen by the Zielona Góra District of the Polish Angling Association. Classified under Poland's fisheries typology as a bream-type lake with characteristics of a vendace-type lake, it hosts a variety of fish species, including tench, northern pike, zander, eel, crucian carp, bream, bleak, white bream, carp, wels catfish, roach, perch, and rudd. The lake supports tourism, recreation, angling, and fisheries. At the beginning of the 21st century, average catches amounted to 30 kg per hectare. A water lock situated several hundred meters north of the lake elevates its water level by approximately 2 meters. The absence of a fish ladder at this structure prevents migration from downstream lakes, including those below Goszcza.

No official bathing area exists in compliance with the Bathing Waters Directive. However, three unofficial "wild beaches" are popularly used: one in the central part of Lubrza village, featuring a pier, children's playground, beach volleyball court, and picnic tables; another on the southern shore in Nowa Wioska; and a third at the northern end, with a pier and beach associated with the former University of Zielona Góra resort. The Nenufar Pedestrian and Cycling Trail, maintained by municipal authorities, encircles the lake.

== Nature ==
The northwestern, western, southern, and southeastern shores are steep, while the eastern shore is flat and locally waterlogged. The southwestern shore is the steepest, with elevations rising up to 32 meters above the water surface. Marshy areas characterise the shoreline near the lake's natural inflow and outflow, where the inflow has deposited a prominent alluvial fan on the lakebed. The steep western shore supports mixed deciduous forest dominated by oak, beech, birch, and hornbeam. The gentler eastern shore is covered primarily by alder.

Aquatic vegetation is most developed along the waterlogged eastern shore, forming a belt that extends approximately 80 metres into the lake. The higher western, northern, and southern shores have sparser vegetation cover. Dominant emergent plants include common reed, narrowleaf cattail, and sweet flag. Submerged vegetation is dominated by pondweeds, charophytes, aquatic mosses, and water milfoils with Canadian waterweed also present.

Early 21st-century spring surveys revealed that phytoplankton comprised 78% of planktonic organisms, with diatoms accounting for 93% of the phytoplankton community; the dominant species were Synedra acus and Asterionella formosa. Cyanobacteria and chlorophytes together made up the remaining 8%. Zooplankton was relatively abundant, led by protozoa, with lower representation of rotifers, copepods, and water fleas. In summer, phytoplankton increased to 89% of the plankton community, with cyanobacteria becoming dominant (Achroonema angustatum, Aphanizomenon spp., Oscillatoria spp., and Anabaena spp.). Dinoflagellates, diatoms, and green algae occurred at lower densities. The composition and seasonal shifts in plankton, particularly the high proportion of cyanobacteria, indicate a high eutrophication of the lake.

== Water purity and environmental protection ==
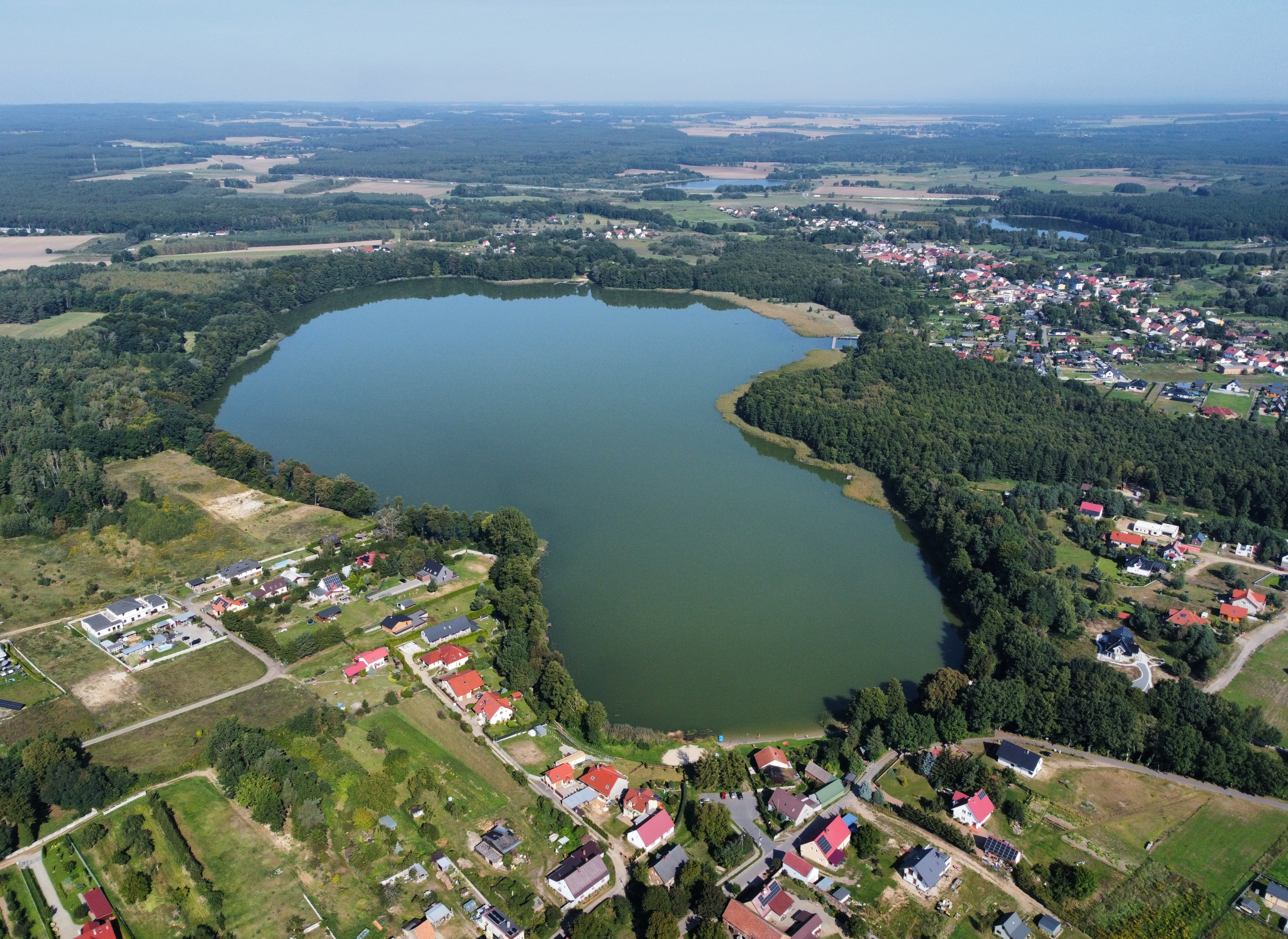
Lake Goszcza viewed from the air from the side of Nowa Wioska. In the distance to the east, the buildings of Lubrza are visible

Lake Goszcza underwent water quality assessments by the Voivodeship Inspectorate for Environmental Protection in Zielona Góra in 1998 and 2003, both resulting in a classification of Class III purity. This low rating stemmed primarily from anoxic conditions in the hypolimnion layer during summer stratification, elevated biochemical oxygen demand indicating high organic matter, and excessive concentrations of phosphates and total phosphorus. The lake also exhibited very high chlorophyll a levels and elevated mineral content, as reflected in high electrolytic conductivity. Wastewater from lakeside settlements is directed to the sewage treatment plant in Lubrza. Bacteriological analyses indicated Class II sanitary conditions in summer and Class I in spring. Water transparency ranged from 2.3 to 2.5 metres in 1998 but declined to an average of 1.3 metres in 2003. Studies identified the primary cause of persistent poor water quality as excessive organic pollutants accumulated in the bottom sediments.

Based on the 2003 evaluation, the lake was deemed moderately resistant to external degradation, assigning it to Category II vulnerability. This classification reflects moderate natural conditions: favourable morphometric features, including considerable average depth, provide some protection against anthropogenic pollution; however, the limited volume of the epilimnion hinders pollutant dilution, and a high annual water exchange rate further impairs water quality.

The lake lies within the Paklica and Ołobok Glacial Valley Nature Park, established primarily to preserve the natural ecological corridor along this glacial tunnel valley.

== Legend ==
The lake features in a legend that is recounted annually during the Night of the Water Lilies event. The legend centers on Lubrzana, the daughter of a Slavic fisherman, who becomes imprisoned within the bloom of a white water lily. This species, commonly known as nenufar, grows abundantly in the lake's waters.
