= Buczyna =

Buczyna may refer to the following places in Poland:

- Buczyna, Lower Silesian Voivodeship (south-west Poland)
- Buczyna, Lesser Poland Voivodeship (south Poland)
- Buczyna, Świebodzin County in Lubusz Voivodeship (west Poland)
- Buczyna, Wschowa County in Lubusz Voivodeship (west Poland)
- Buczyna, West Pomeranian Voivodeship (north-west Poland)
