= Staropole, Lubusz Voivodeship =

Staropole
- Village
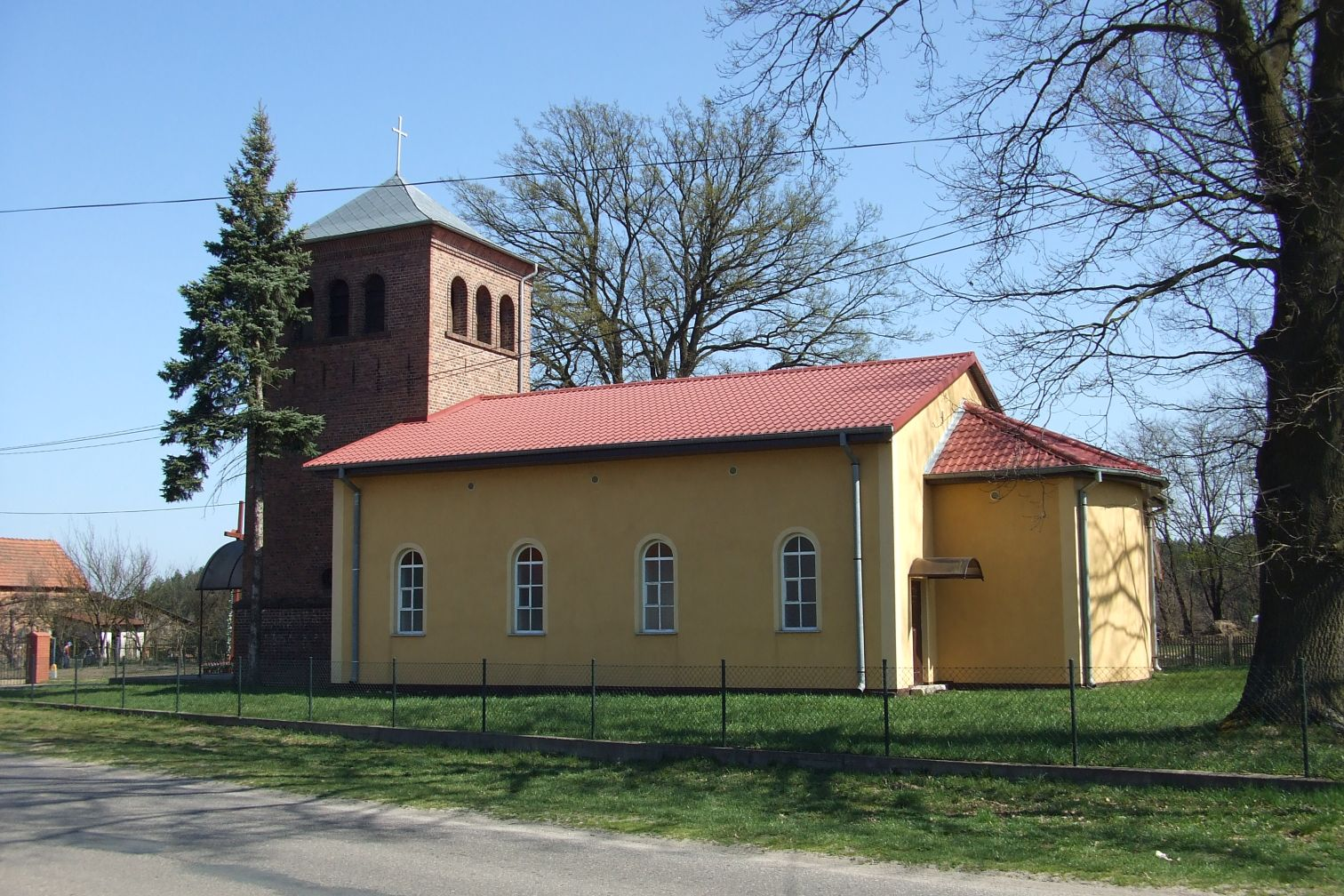
- Church in Staropole

- Location within Poland
- Coordinates: 52°20′43″N 15°26′46″E
- Country: Poland
- Voivodeship: Lubusz
- County: Świebodzin
- Gmina: Lubrza
- Population: 450

Staropole [starɔˈpɔlɛ] is a village in the administrative district of Gmina Lubrza, within Świebodzin County, Lubusz Voivodeship, in western Poland.
