= Mrówczyn =

- Village
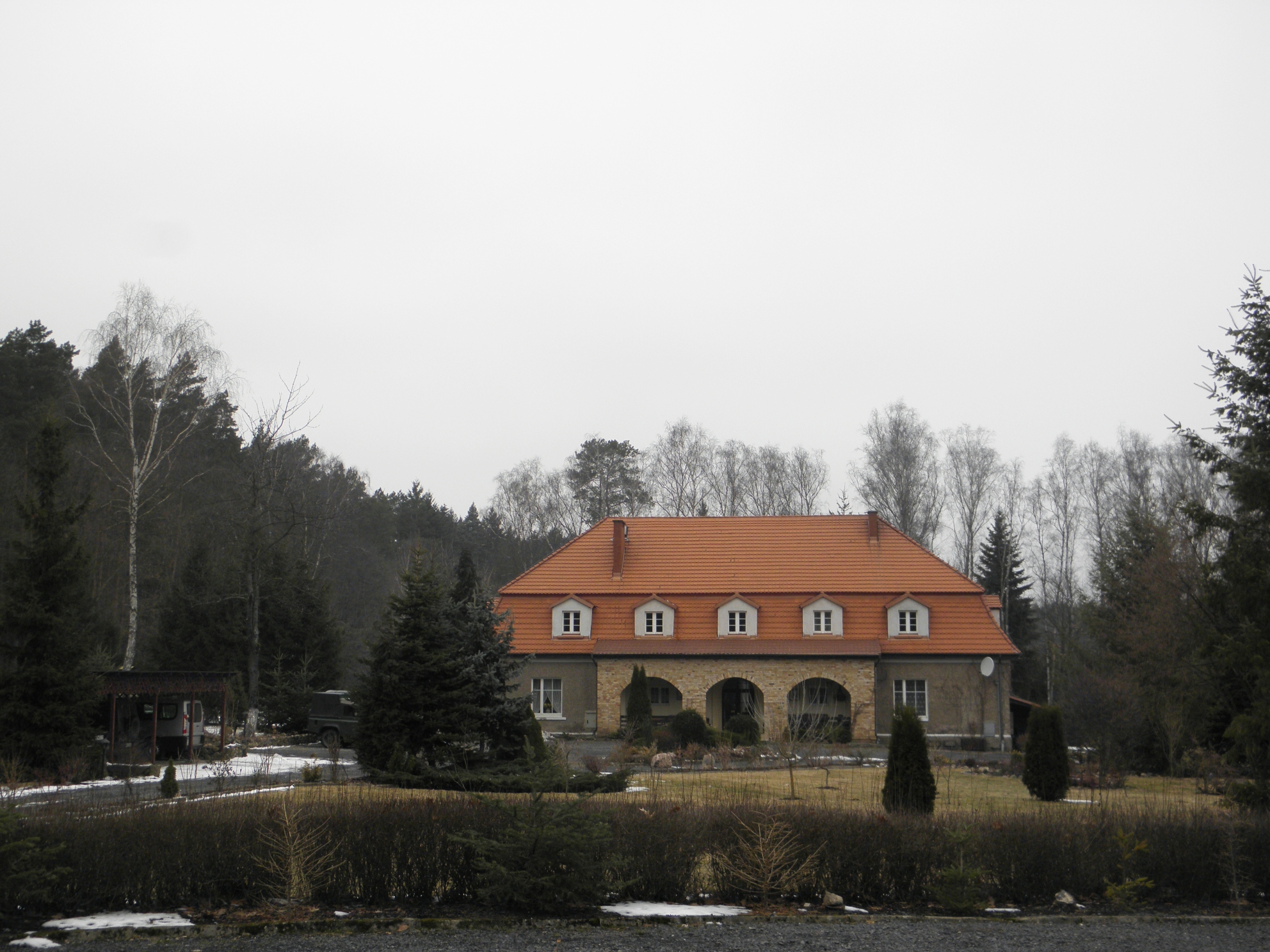

- Location within Poland
- Coordinates: 52°16′N 15°21′E
- Country: Poland
- Voivodeship: Lubusz
- County: Świebodzin
- Gmina: Lubrza

Mrówczyn [ˈmruft͡ʂɨn] is a village in the administrative district of Gmina Lubrza, within Świebodzin County, Lubusz Voivodeship, in western Poland.
