= Zagaje, Świebodzin County =

Zagaje
- Village
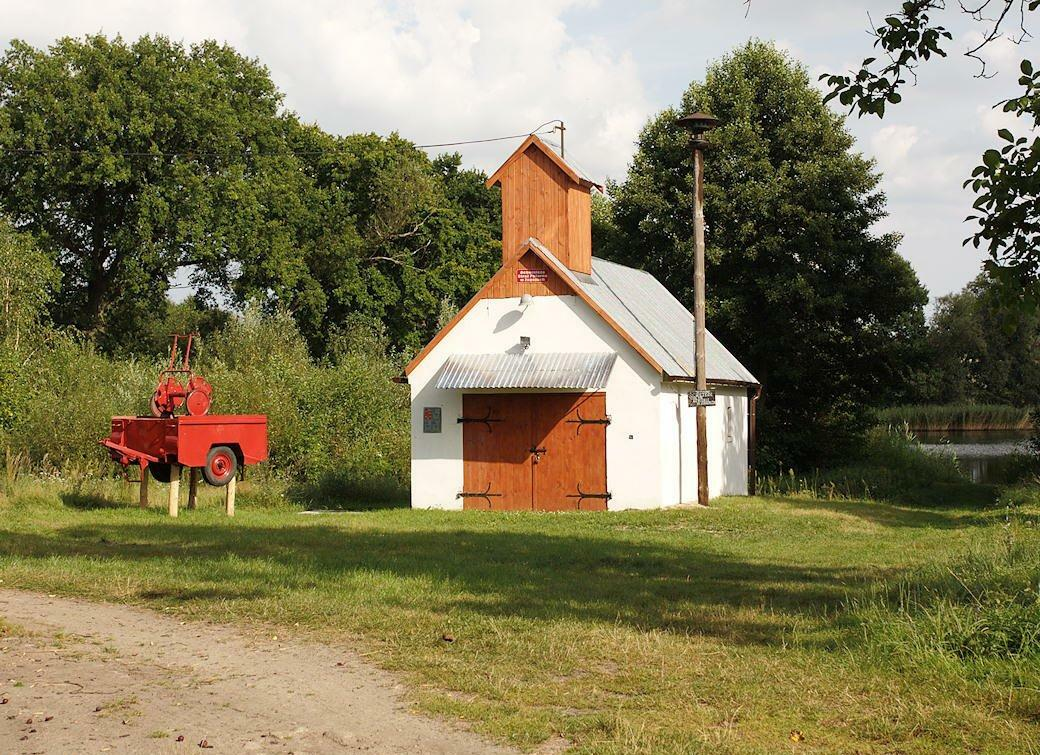
- Fire station

- Location within Poland
- Coordinates: 52°19′30″N 15°24′16″E
- Country: Poland
- Voivodeship: Lubusz
- County: Świebodzin
- Gmina: Lubrza

Zagaje [zaˈɡajɛ] is a village in the administrative district of Gmina Lubrza, within Świebodzin County, Lubusz Voivodeship, in western Poland.
