= Przełazy =

- Village
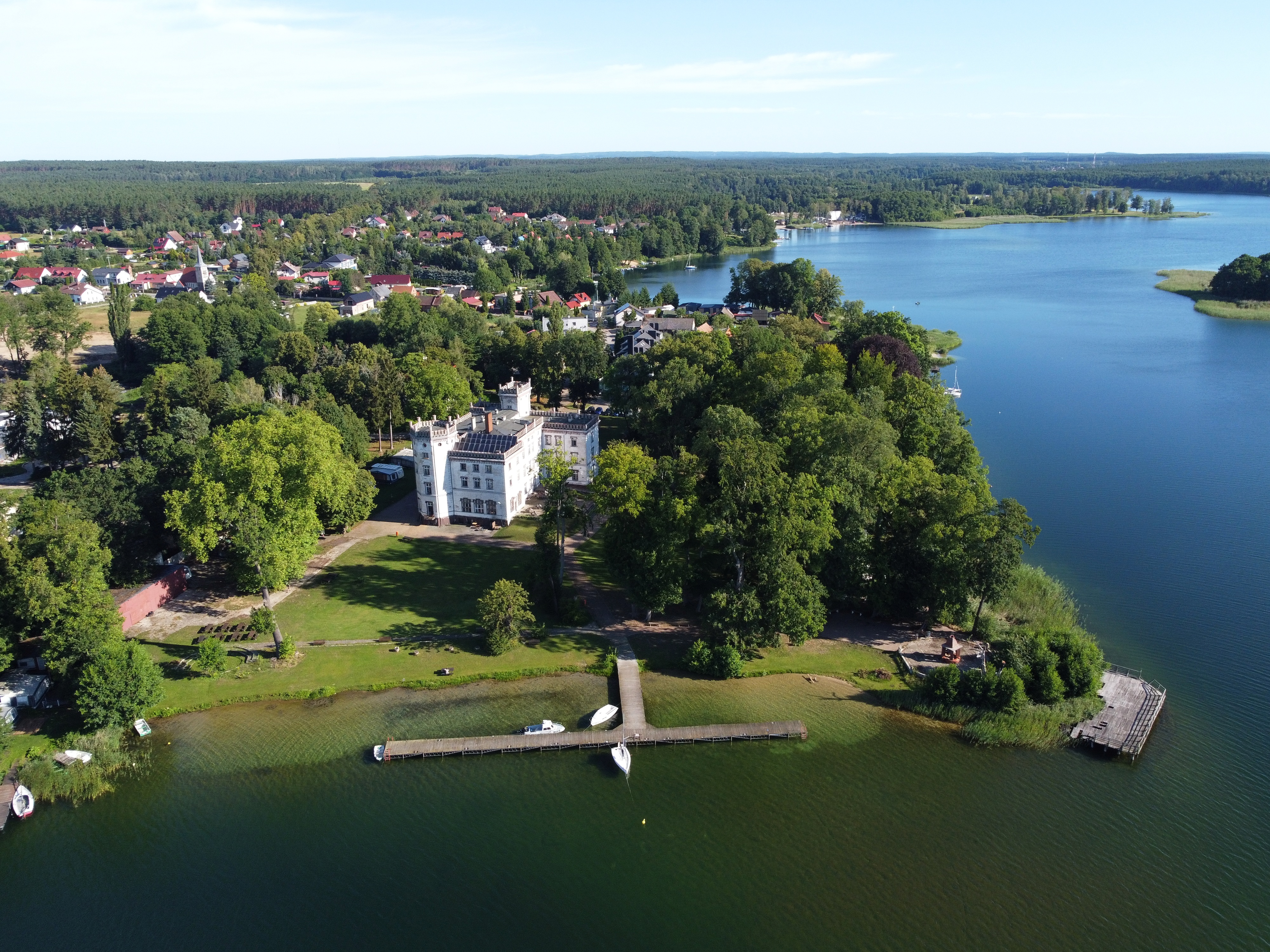
- Palace in Przełazy

- Location within Poland
- Coordinates: 52°14′N 15°23′E
- Country: Poland
- Voivodeship: Lubusz
- County: Świebodzin
- Gmina: Lubrza
- Population (2009): 208
- ZIP Code: 66-218
- Calling Code: (+48) 68
- Vehicle registration: FSW

Przełazy [pʂɛˈwazɨ] is a village in the administrative district of Gmina Lubrza, within Świebodzin County, Lubusz Voivodeship, in western Poland. The village is situated on the western shore of Niesłysz Lake.

The Przełazy (Seeläsgen) meteorite (102 kg) was found nearby in 1847.

== Notable residents ==
- Hans-Karl Wittig (1918–1984) Luftwaffe officer
