= Mostki, Lubusz Voivodeship =

Mostki
- Village
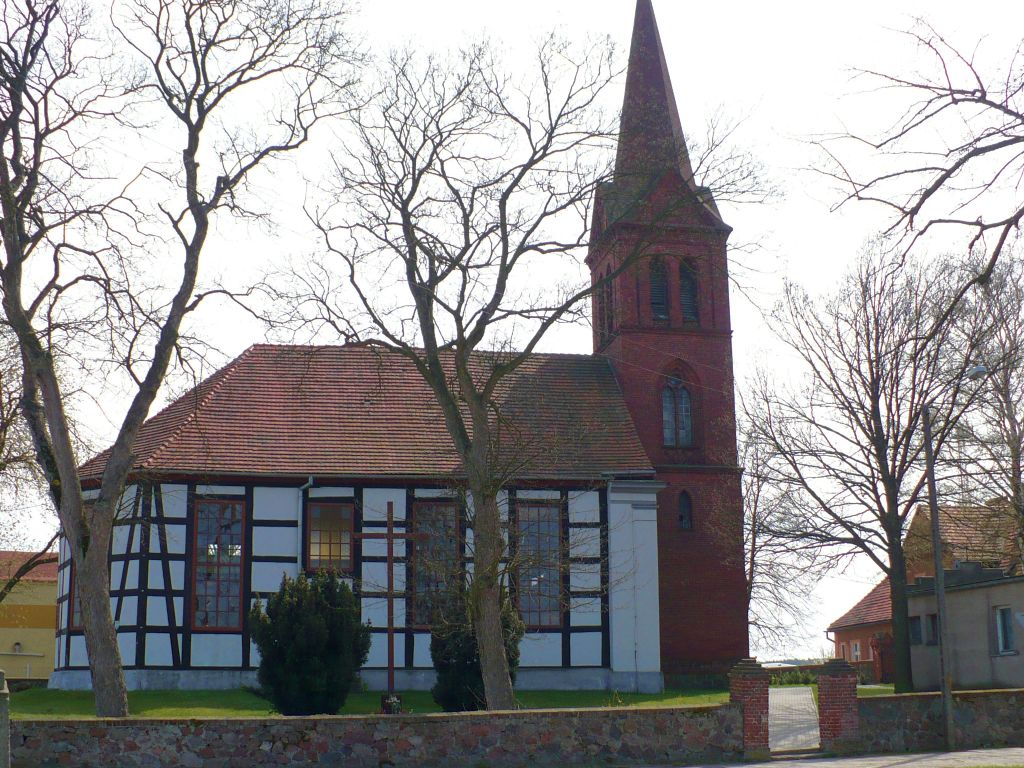
- Our Lady of Częstochowa church in Mostki

- Location within Poland
- Coordinates: 52°15′44″N 15°23′51″E
- Country: Poland
- Voivodeship: Lubusz
- County: Świebodzin
- Gmina: Lubrza
- Population: 500

Mostki [ˈmɔstki] (de: Möstchen) is a village in the administrative district of Gmina Lubrza, within Świebodzin County, Lubusz Voivodeship, in western Poland. It is located in the Neumark, near Lake Niesłysz.

== History ==
In the 14th century, the village was under the control of the Löben. From 1650 to 1693 Möstchen was under the control the Pfuel Family. Around the middle of the 19th century, the District Administrator v. Brescius, b. Paech, was owner of the Möstchen manor. In the village were three watermills. The lordship exercised patronage over the Protestant village church.

In 1838, Old Lutherans migrated to South Australia on the Zebra. Among the emigrants were members of the Bartel, Boehm, Janetzi and Schubert families.

Until 1945 the village was part of the Züllichau-Schwiebus district.

Towards the end of the Second World War the region with the village was occupied by the Red Army. After the end of the war, Möstchen was placed under Polish administration.

The village has a population of 500.

== Notable people ==
Boehm, Traugott Wilhelm (1836–1917) was a schoolmaster, founder of the German School in Hahndorf, South Australia, which became Hahndorf Academy then Hahndorf College.
