= Zagórze, Świebodzin County =

Zagórze
- Village
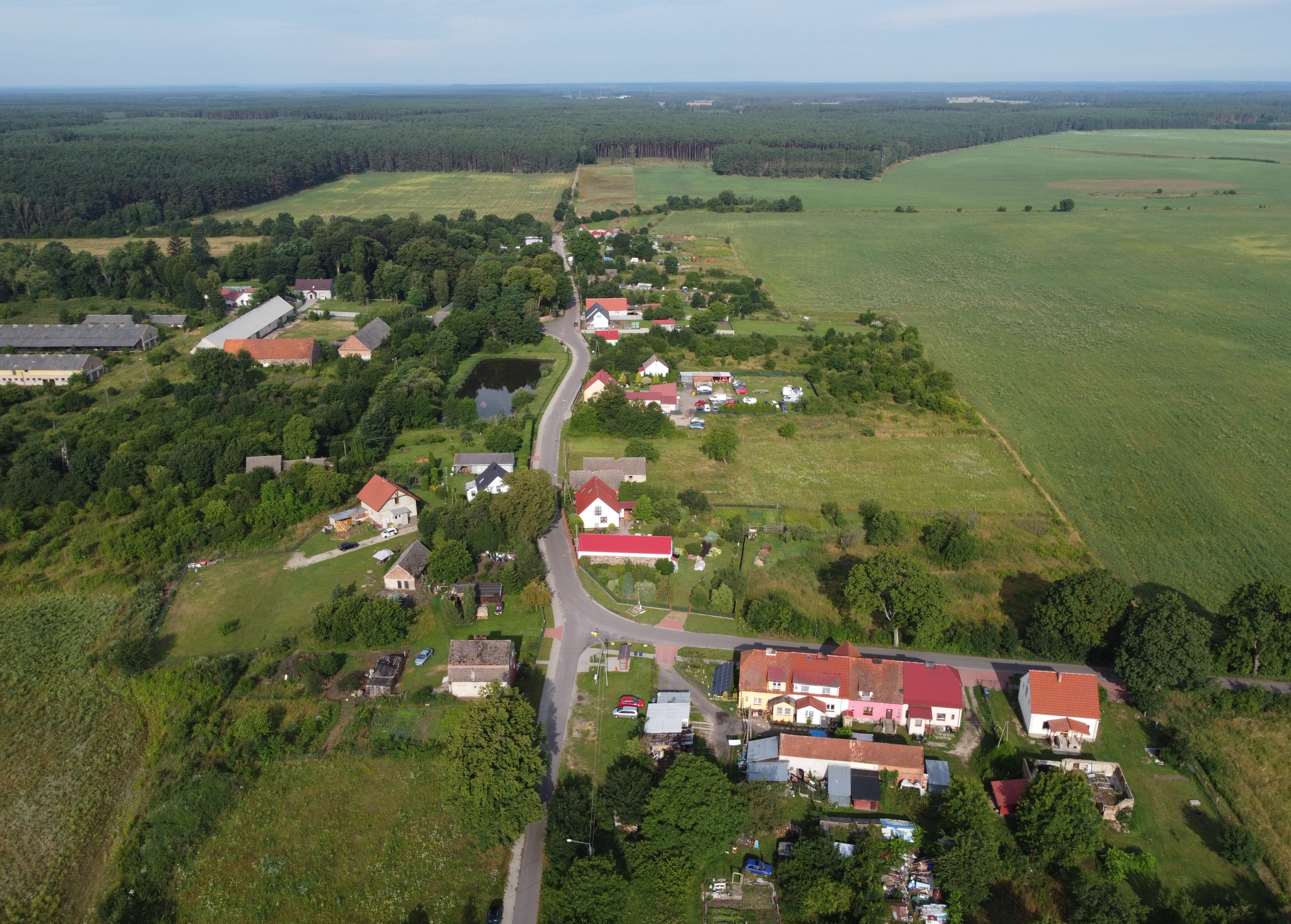

- Location within Poland
- Coordinates: 52°15′48″N 15°20′13″E
- Country: Poland
- Voivodeship: Lubusz
- County: Świebodzin
- Gmina: Lubrza
- Population: 130

Zagórze [zaˈɡuʐɛ] is a village in the administrative district of Gmina Lubrza, within Świebodzin County, Lubusz Voivodeship, in western Poland.
