= Laski, Świebodzin County =

Laski
- Settlement
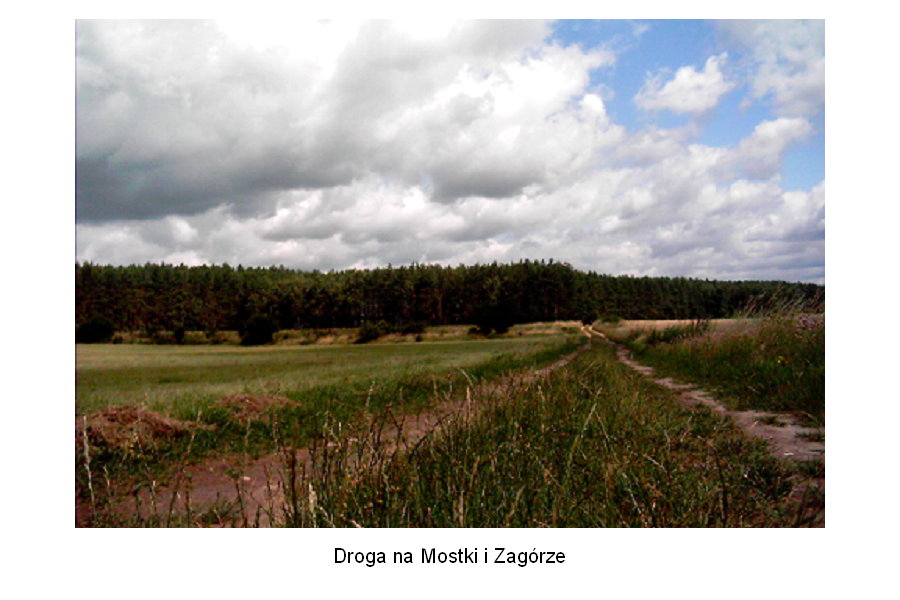

- Location within Poland
- Coordinates: 52°14′N 15°23′E
- Country: Poland
- Voivodeship: Lubusz
- County: Świebodzin
- Gmina: Lubrza
- Population: 33

Laski (Polish pronunciation: [ˈlaskʲi]) is a settlement in the administrative district of Gmina Lubrza, within Świebodzin County, Lubusz Voivodeship, in western Poland.
