= Romanówek =

- Village
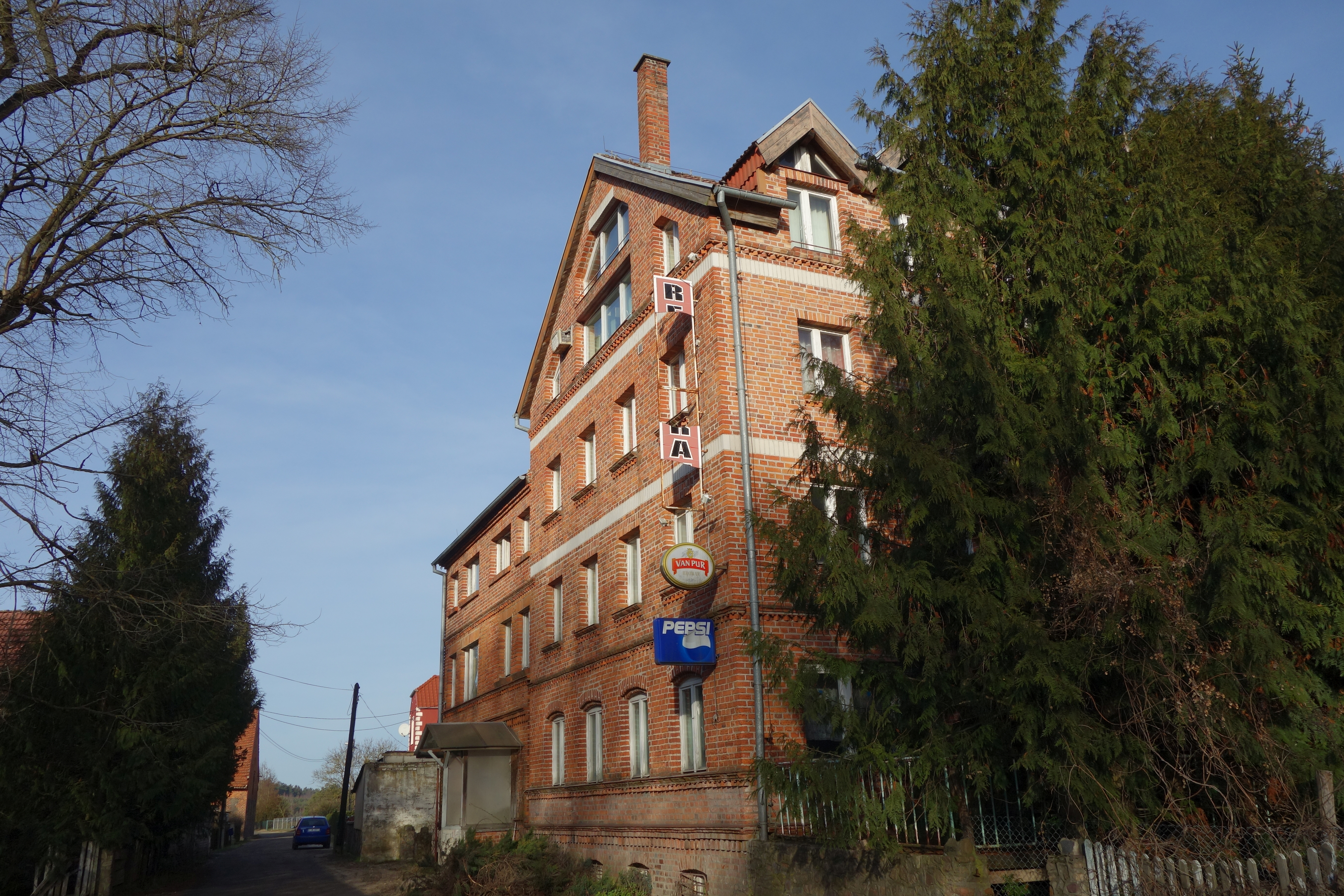

- Location within Poland
- Coordinates: 52°18′N 15°25′E
- Country: Poland
- Voivodeship: Lubusz
- County: Świebodzin
- Gmina: Lubrza
- Population: 40

Romanówek [rɔmaˈnuvɛk] is a village in the administrative district of Gmina Lubrza, within Świebodzin County, Lubusz Voivodeship, in western Poland.
