= Chałupczyn =

- Settlement
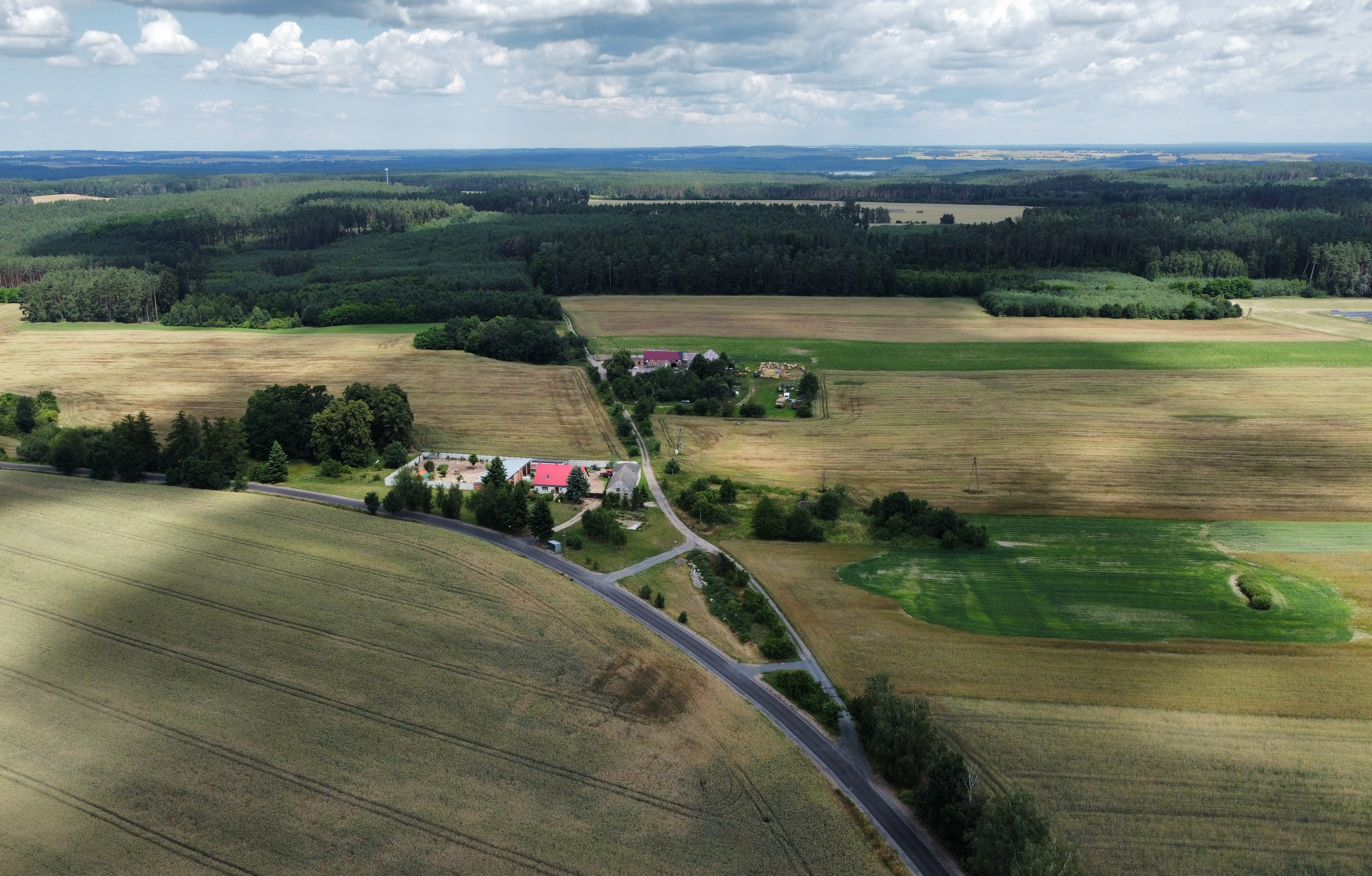

- Location within Poland
- Coordinates: 52°17′35″N 15°28′39″E
- Country: Poland
- Voivodeship: Lubusz
- County: Świebodzin
- Gmina: Lubrza
- Population: 10

Chałupczyn [xaˈwupt͡ʂɨn] is a settlement in the administrative district of Gmina Lubrza, within Świebodzin County, Lubusz Voivodeship, in western Poland.
