= Tyczyno =

- Settlement
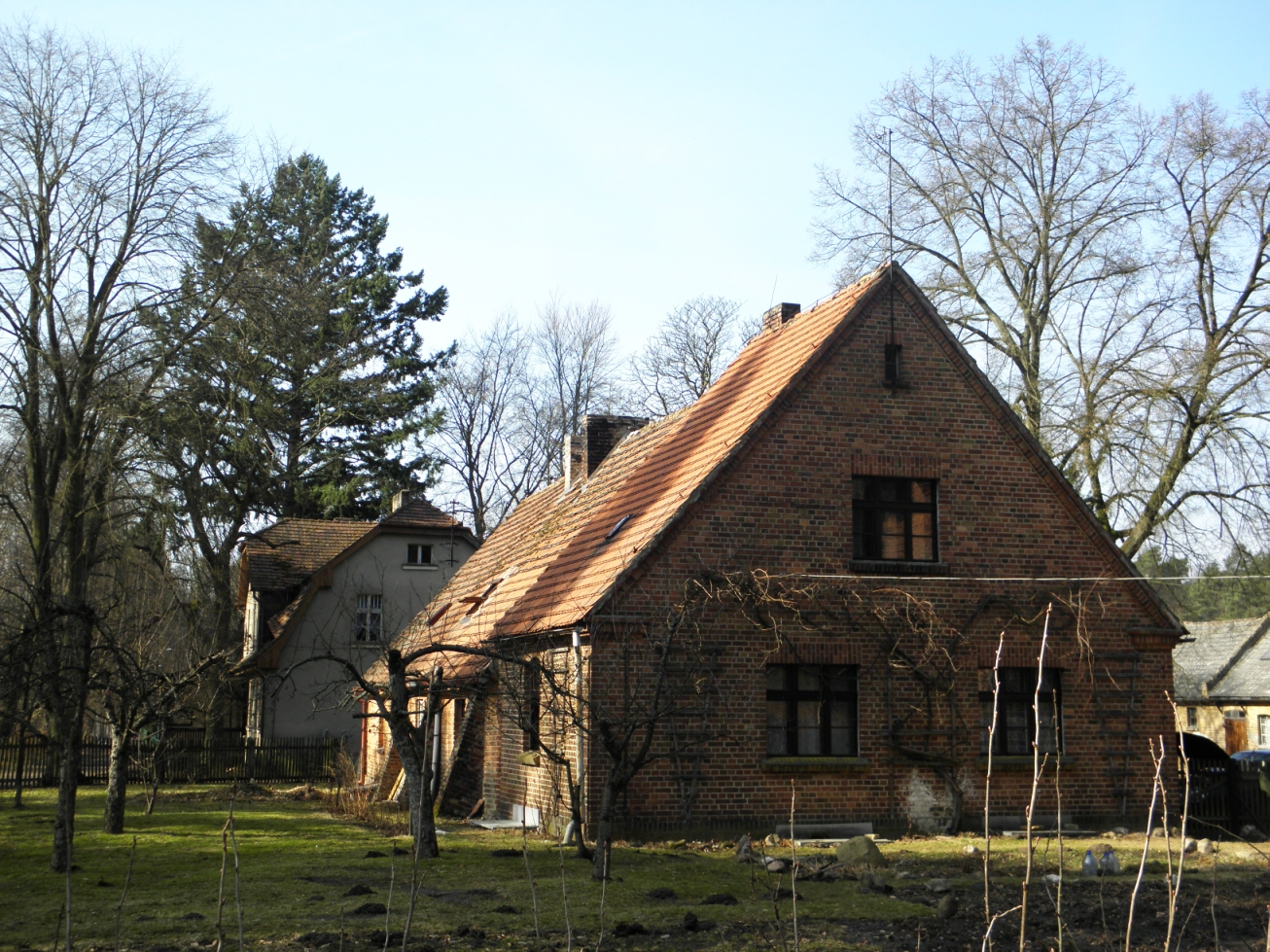

- Location within Poland
- Coordinates: 52°14′33″N 15°24′1″E
- Country: Poland
- Voivodeship: Lubusz
- County: Świebodzin
- Gmina: Lubrza

Tyczyno [tɨˈt͡ʂɨnɔ] is a settlement in the administrative district of Gmina Lubrza, within Świebodzin County, Lubusz Voivodeship, in western Poland.
