= Dolisko =

- Settlement
- Location within Poland
- Coordinates: 52°16′47″N 15°21′31″E
- Country: Poland
- Voivodeship: Lubusz
- County: Świebodzin
- Gmina: Lubrza

Dolisko [dɔˈliskɔ] is a settlement in the administrative district of Gmina Lubrza, within Świebodzin County, Lubusz Voivodeship, in western Poland.
