= Janisławiec, Lubusz Voivodeship =

Janisławiec
- Village
- Location within Poland
- Coordinates: 52°15′26″N 15°25′8″E
- Country: Poland
- Voivodeship: (Lubusz Voivodeship) Lubusz
- County: Świebodzin
- Gmina: Lubrza
- Population: 10

Janisławiec [janiˈswavjɛt͡s] is a village in the administrative district of Gmina Lubrza, within Świebodzin County, Lubusz Voivodeship, in western Poland.
