= Buczyna, Świebodzin County =

Buczyna
- Village
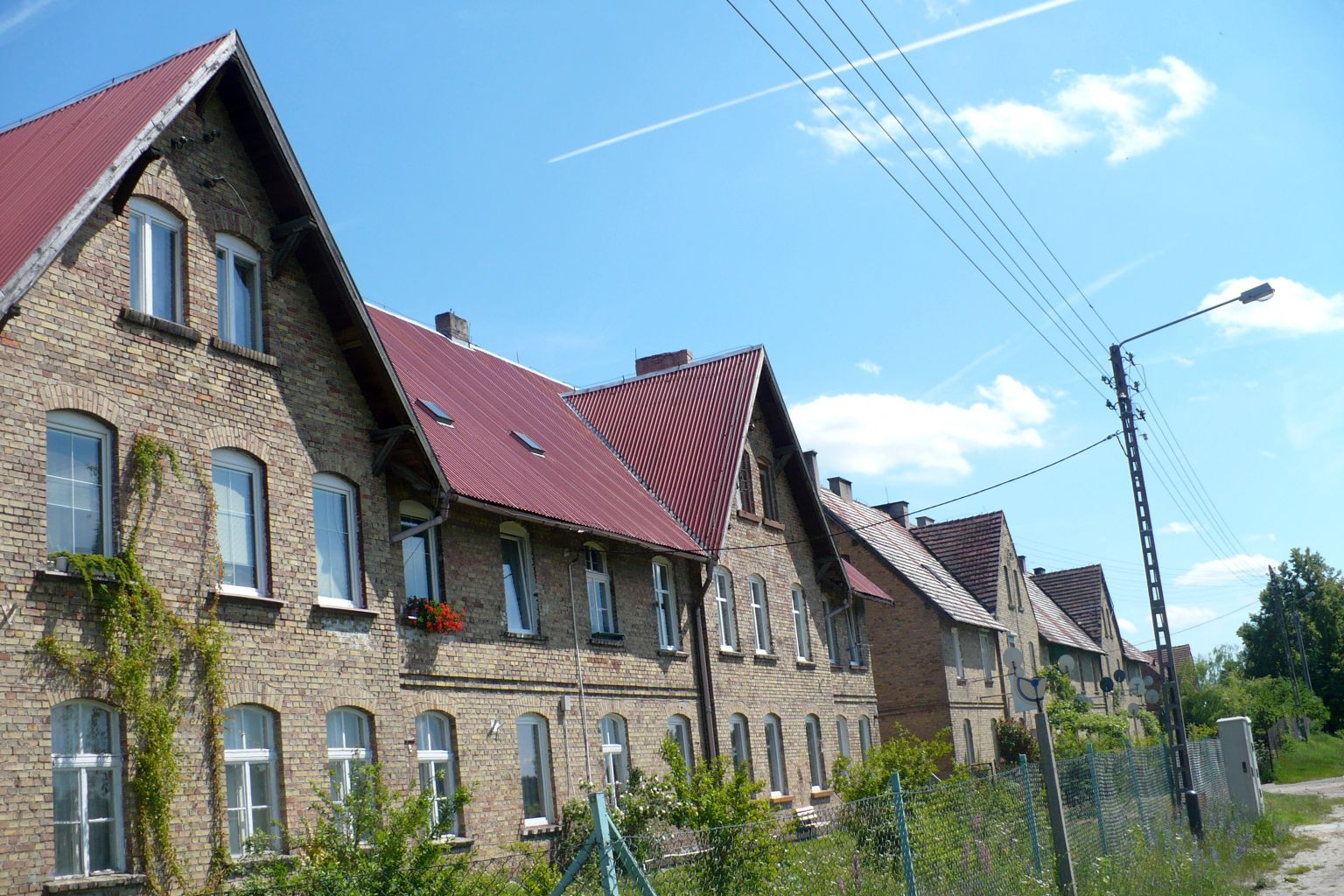

- Location within Poland
- Coordinates: 52°20′13″N 15°24′6″E
- Country: Poland
- Voivodeship: Lubusz
- County: Świebodzin
- Gmina: Lubrza
- Population: 30

Buczyna [buˈt͡ʂɨna] is a village in the administrative district of Gmina Lubrza, within Świebodzin County, Lubusz Voivodeship, in western Poland.
