= Nowa Wioska, Świebodzin County =

Nowa Wioska
- Village
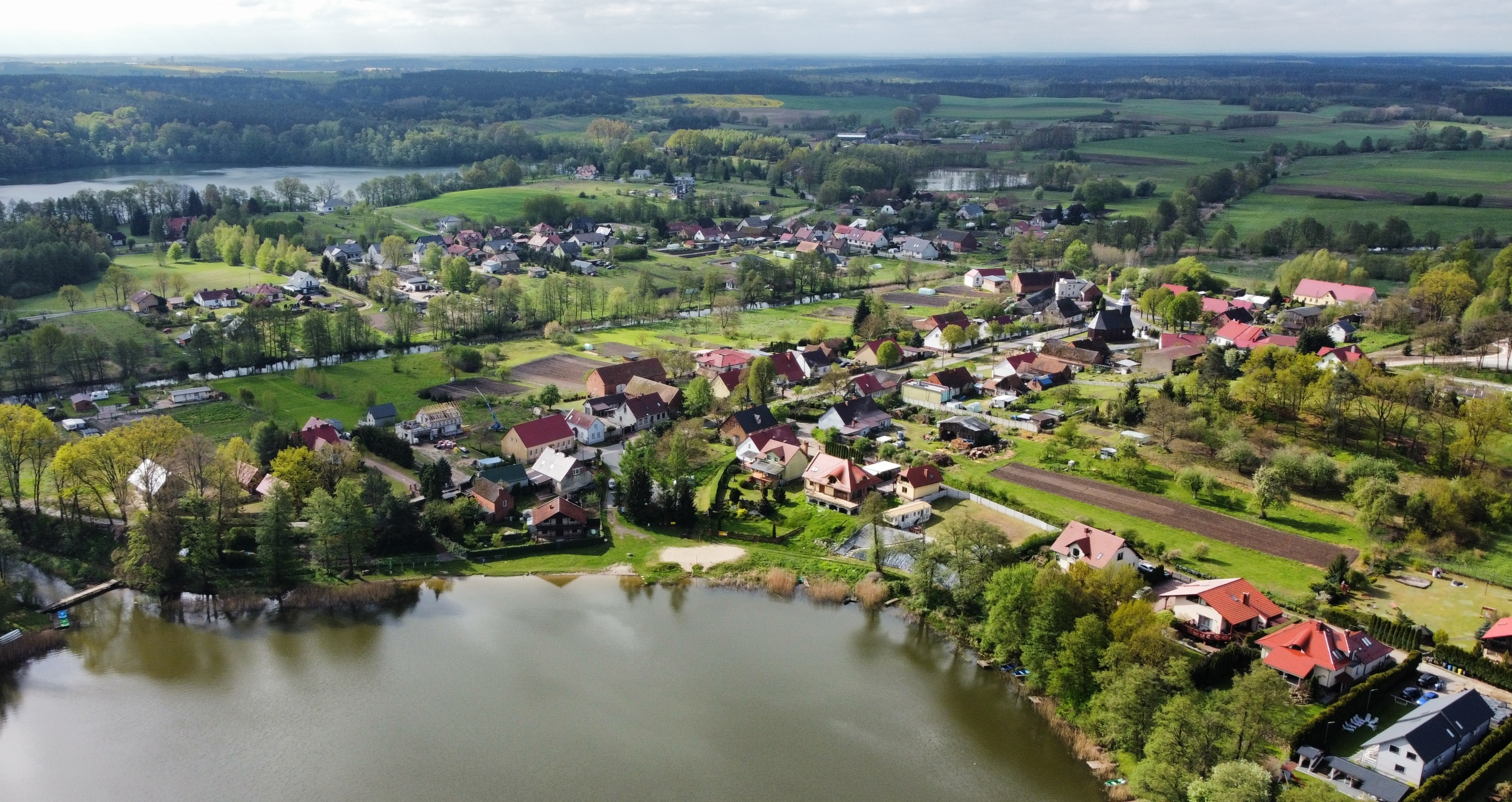
- Beach in Nowa Wioska

- Location within Poland
- Coordinates: 52°17′28″N 15°26′27″E
- Country: Poland
- Voivodeship: Lubusz
- County: Świebodzin
- Gmina: Lubrza
- Population: 280

Nowa Wioska [ˈnɔva ˈvjɔska] is a village in the administrative district of Gmina Lubrza, within Świebodzin County, Lubusz Voivodeship, in western Poland.
