= Gmina Lubrza, Lubusz Voivodeship =

Gmina Lubrza Lubrza Commune
- Gmina
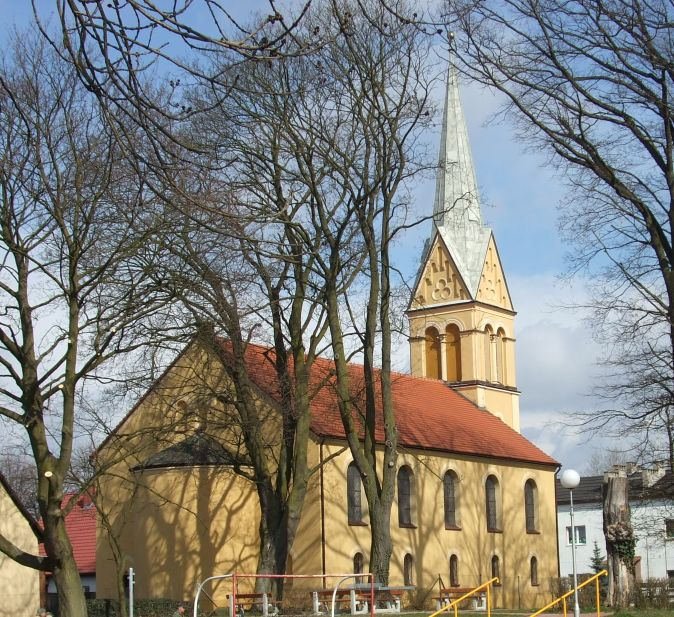
- Lubrza kościół

- Coat of arms

- Location within Poland
- Coordinates (Lubrza): 52°18′20″N 15°26′34″E
- Country: Poland
- Voivodeship: Lubusz
- County: Świebodzin
- Seat: Lubrza

Area
  - Total: 122.28 km^{2} (47.21 sq mi)

Population (2019-06-30)
  - Total: 3,534
  - Density: 28.90/km^{2} (74.85/sq mi)
- Website: www.lubrza.pl

Gmina Lubrza (German: Liebenau (Neumark)) is a rural gmina (administrative district) in Świebodzin County, Lubusz Voivodeship, in western Poland. Its seat is the village of Lubrza, which lies approximately 9 kilometres (6 mi) north-west of Świebodzin, 41 km (25 mi) north of Zielona Góra, and 50 km (31 mi) south of Gorzów Wielkopolski.

Gmina Lubrza covers an area of 122.28 square kilometres (47.2 sq mi), and as of 2019 its total population is 3,534.

== Villages ==
Gmina Lubrza contains the villages and settlements of Boryszyn, Bucze, Buczyna, Chałupczyn, Dolisko, Janisławiec, Laski, Lubrza, Mostki, Mrówczyn, Nowa Wioska, Przełazy, Romanówek, Staropole, Tyczyno, Zagaje and Zagórze.

== Neighbouring gminas ==
Gmina Lubrza is bordered by the gminas of Łagów, Międzyrzecz, Skąpe, Sulęcin and Świebodzin.

== Twin towns – sister cities ==
Gmina Lubrza is twinned with:

- Burg, Germany
- Neuenkirchen, Germany
