= Lubrza, Lubusz Voivodeship =

Lubrza
- Village
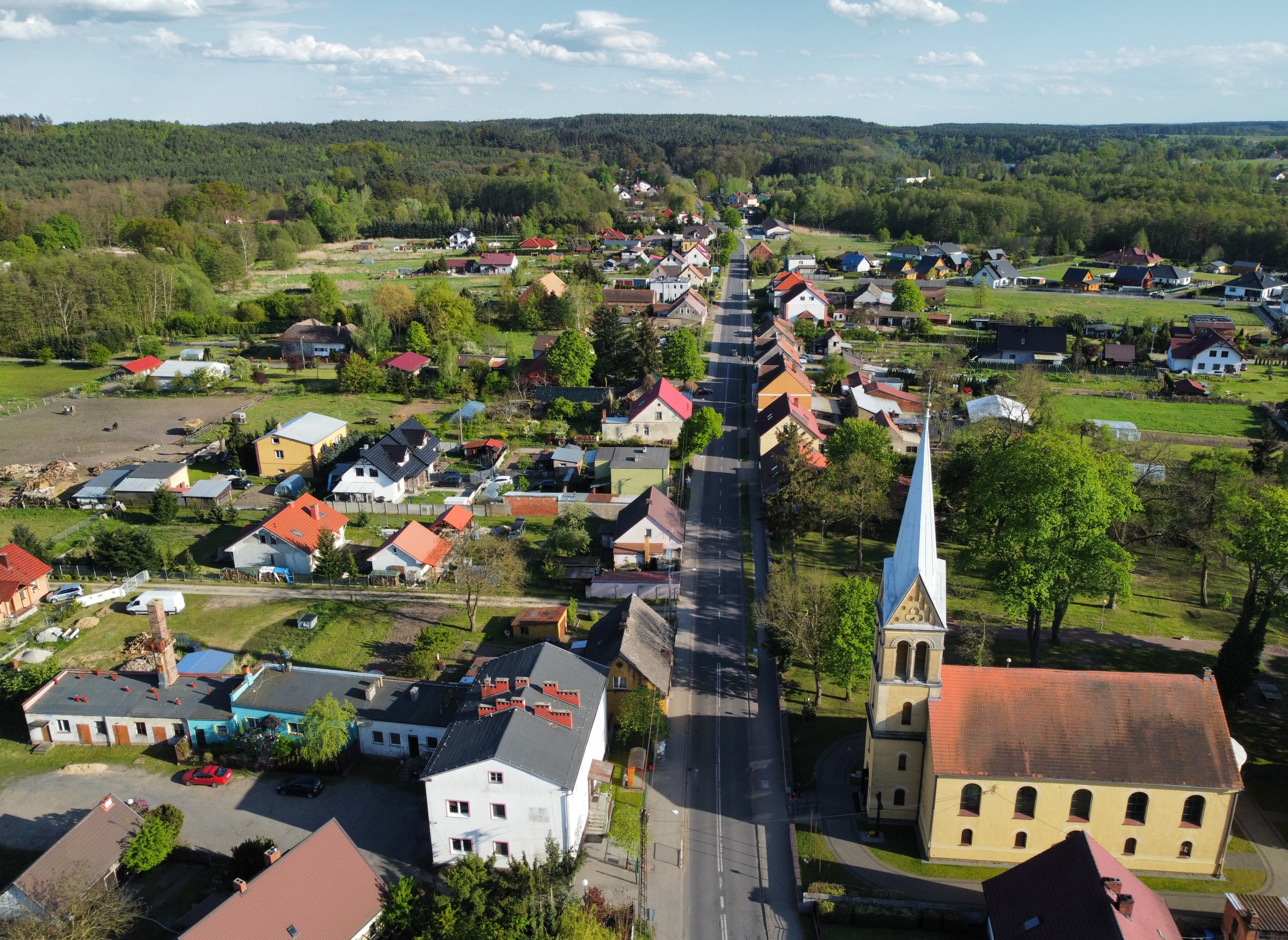

- Location within Poland
- Coordinates: 52°18′20″N 15°26′34″E
- Country: Poland
- Voivodeship: Lubusz
- County: Świebodzin
- Gmina: Lubrza
- First mentioned: 1246

Population (2019)
  - Total: 1,078
- Time zone: UTC+1 (CET)
  - Summer (DST): UTC+2 (CEST)
- Vehicle registration: FSW
- Website: http://www.lubrza.pl

Lubrza [ˈlubʐa] is a village in Świebodzin County, Lubusz Voivodeship, in western Poland. It is the seat of the gmina (administrative district) called Gmina Lubrza. It is located between the Goszcza and Lubrza lakes.

== History ==
The oldest mention of the village comes from 1246, when it was granted to a Cistercian monastery from nearby Gościkowo by Bodzenta, son of Janusz, in thanks for ransoming him from German captivity, however, a portion of the village remained a noble possession, as in 1276, it was partially owned by castellan of Zbąszyń Wojciech of Dryja, thanks to whose efforts Lubrza obtained town rights. By 1302, it was the seat of a wójt within the Duchy of Głogów. In the 14th century, the Dryja family built a tower castle. In 1322, the remaining part of Lubrza was sold to the Gościkowo-Paradyż abbey. In 1383 the town obtained the right to hold a market. In 1546, the abbot of the Gościkowo-Paradyż monastery was kidnapped by the Brandenburgers during a return journey from Lubrza to Gościkowo, and then imprisoned near Cottbus (Chóśebuz) for several weeks. In 1613, annual fairs were established. In 1810, the settlement was secularized and ceased to be a church property.

Five Polish citizens were murdered by Nazi Germany in the village during World War II. The town was partly destroyed during the war in 1945. There is a preserved military bunker and military weir from World War II in Lubrza.

== Notable residents ==
- Alexander Tietze (1864–1927), German surgeon
