= February 1919 =

Month in 1919

<<	February 1919					>>
Su	Mo	Tu	We	Th	Fr	Sa
						1
2	3	4	5	6	7	8
9	10	11	12	13	14	15
16	17	18	19	20	21	22
23	24	25	26	27	28

The following events occurred in February 1919:

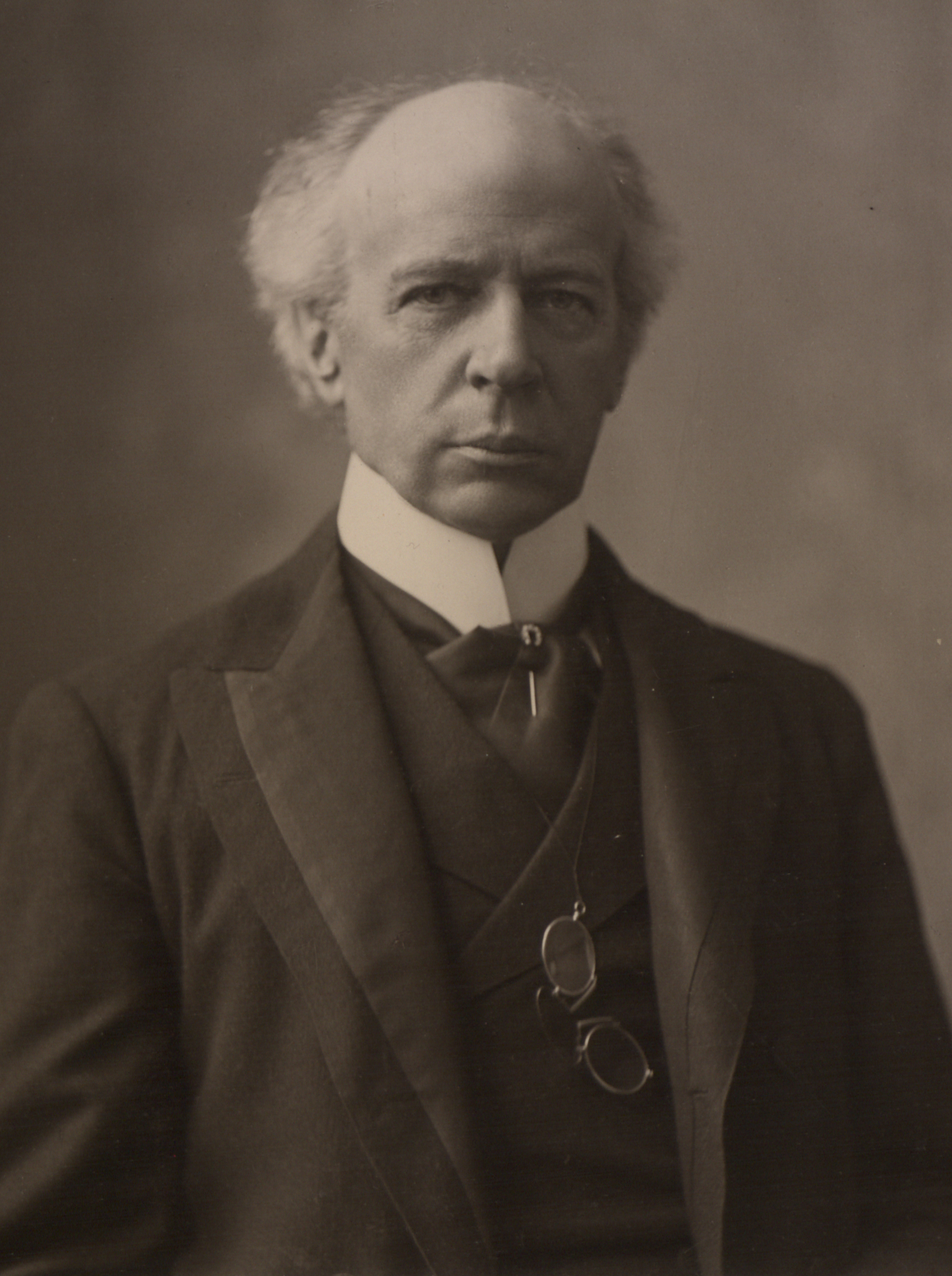
Wilfrid Laurier, former Prime Minister of Canada, dies in Ottawa.

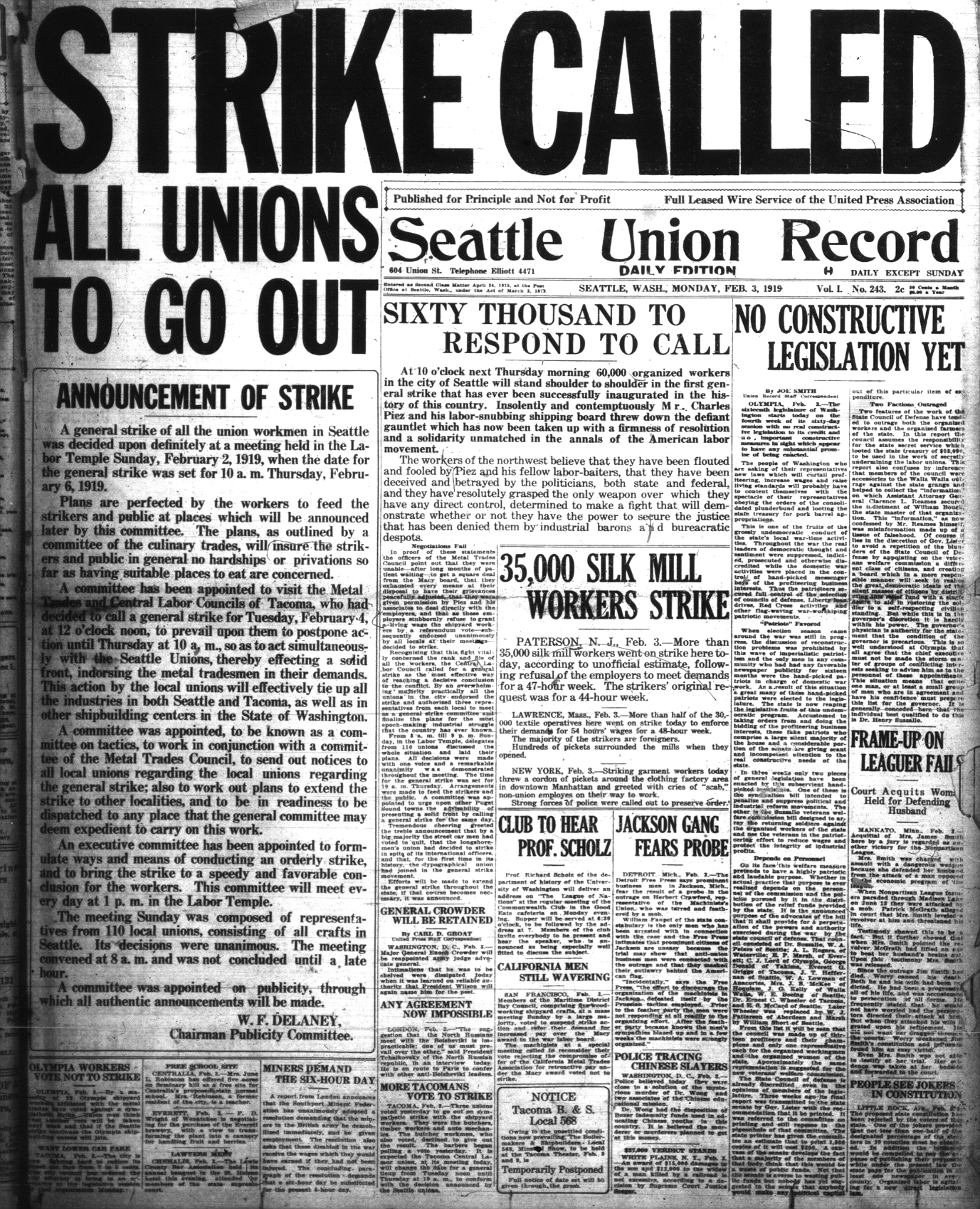
Seattle Union Record newspaper headlines a citywide strike, inciting the First Red Scare.

== February 1, 1919 (Saturday) ==
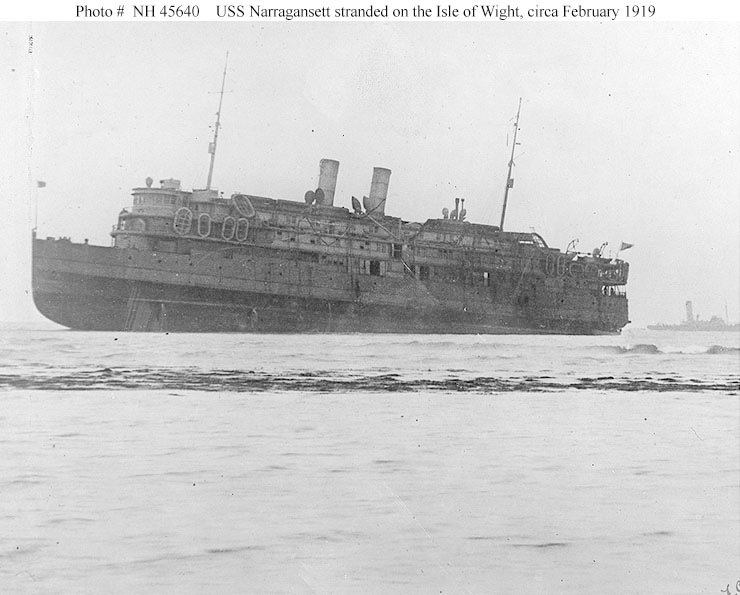
U.S. Navy troopship USS Narragansett after it ran aground in the English Channel.

- Estonian War of Independence – Estonian forces liberated Valga and Võru, expelling the Red Army from the entire territory of Estonia.
- Khotyn Uprising – The Romanian Army regained control of Khotyn, Bessarabia from rebel forces. It was estimated Romanian forces inflicted 15,000 casualties on the ethnic Ukrainians over 12 days of fighting and forced 4,000 rebel soldiers and 50,000 refugees to cross the Dniester River into neighboring Ukraine.
- U.S. Navy troopship USS Narragansett ran aground in the English Channel, with over 3,500 people evacuated from the ship. She was refloated on 17 February.
- Car manufacturer Samuel Pandolfo and all members of his executive with the Pan Motor Company were convicted of fraud by trial jury in St. Cloud, Minnesota. Despite an attempt to appeal the decision, mounting costs and poor public reactions lead to the company closing by 1923 after which Pandolfo surrendered to authorities and served two years in prison.
- Cecil McKenzie Hill, chief instructor for the Canterbury Aviation Company, was killed in an air accident while flying over Riccarton, New Zealand in what was the country's first aircraft fatality.
- The German National Library of Economics was founded as department for the Kiel Institute for the World Economy in Kiel, Germany.
- Clark County, Idaho was established with its seat in Dubois.
- Several rail stations were reopened in Great Britain after being closed down during World War I, including stations Kingsknowe in Edinburgh, Rhosneigr in Wales, and Glasson in England.

== February 2, 1919 (Sunday) ==
- Russian Civil War: The Battle of Dolakovo was fought near the villages of Dolakovo and Kantyshevo as General Anton Denikin led the Whites' Volunteer Army on an attack against the Communist militia of the Ingush people in the Northern Caucasus. The attack began after the Ingush militia, led by Mussa Sautivev, refused to comply with an ultimatum from General Denikin to allow the Whites safe passage through Ingush territory. Although the 40,000 White Russian troops outnumbered the 10,000 troops of the militia, the Whites lost 2,500 killed compared to about 300 for the Ingush.
- Born:
  - Lisa Della Casa, Swiss opera singer, best known for her collaborations with Bavarian State Opera and Metropolitan Opera; in Burgdorf, Switzerland (d. 2012)
  - Anne Fogarty, American fashion designer, developed the sportswear look for women, author of Wife Dressing; as Anne Whitney, in Pittsburgh, United States (d. 1980)
  - Ernst-Wilhelm Reinert, German air force officer, commander of the Jagdgeschwader 77, Jagdgeschwader 27, and Taktisches Luftwaffengeschwader 31 for the Luftwaffe during World War II, recipient of the Knight's Cross of the Iron Cross; in Lindenthal, Cologne, Weimar Republic (present-day Germany) (d. 2007)

== February 3, 1919 (Monday) ==
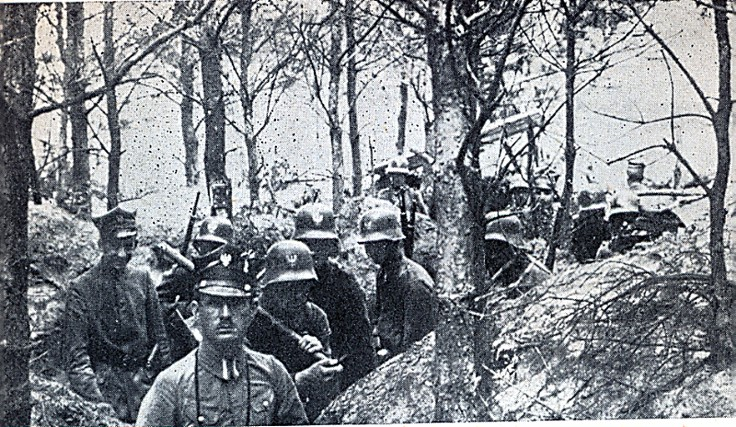
Polish troops man trenches during the Battle of Rawicz in Greater Poland.

- Battle of Kiev – The Red Army began a siege on Kiev.
- Battle of Rawicz – Polish rebel forces attempted to capture the town of Rawicz in Greater Poland from occupying German forces.
- An estimated 12,000 British troops and six tanks were deployed to key points around Glasgow and the surrounding area to keep the peace following riots stemming from the largest general strike in Scotland.
- Éamon de Valera, the leader of Sinn Féin, escaped from Lincoln Prison in England along with two other comrades in a breakout arranged by fellow Sinn Féin members Michael Collins and Harry Boland.
- Auto engine manufacturer Cummins was established in Columbus, Indiana.
- The London Underground opened Debden Station on the Central line.
- Born: Bill Alley, Australian cricketer, batsmen for the New South Wales cricket team from 1946 to 1947 and Somerset County Cricket Club from 1958 to 1968; in Hornsby, New South Wales, Australia (d. 2004)
- Died: Mary Moore, Irish actress, sister of Matt, Owen and Tom Moore, known for film roles including A Million a Minute (b. 1890)

== February 4, 1919 (Tuesday) ==
- Women were granted the right to vote and stand in elections in Belarus.
- A new capital of Slovakia was established at Bratislava, formerly Pressburg.
- The New Zealand Rifle Brigade was disbanded.
- The first prototype of the Bristol Badger aircraft crashed on its test flight due to fuel supply problems. It was not until May that engineering issues were resolved and it could make a second flight.
- The United States Congress established three medals specific for the United States Navy and United States Marine Corps:
  - The Navy Distinguished Service Medal, which was to be awarded those that served in either the navy or marines, with the first presentation posthumously given to Brigadier General Charles A. Doyen, for being the first marine officer to command a United States Army division in World War I.
  - The Navy Cross, which was to be awarded to those that displayed exceptional or heroic service in the United States Navy.
  - The Tiffany Cross Medal of Honor, which was to be awarded to those that displayed heroic service outside of combat.
- Born:
  - Peter Butterworth, English actor, best known for his comedic roles in the Carry On series, and The Monk in Doctor Who; in Bramhall, England (d. 1979)
  - Janet Waldo, American actress, best known for the voices of Judy Jetson in The Jetsons and Josie in Josie and the Pussycats; in Yakima, Washington, United States (d. 2016)
- Died: William Gilbert, 89, Australian politician, member of the South Australian House of Assembly from 1881 to 1906 (b. 1829)

== February 5, 1919 (Wednesday) ==
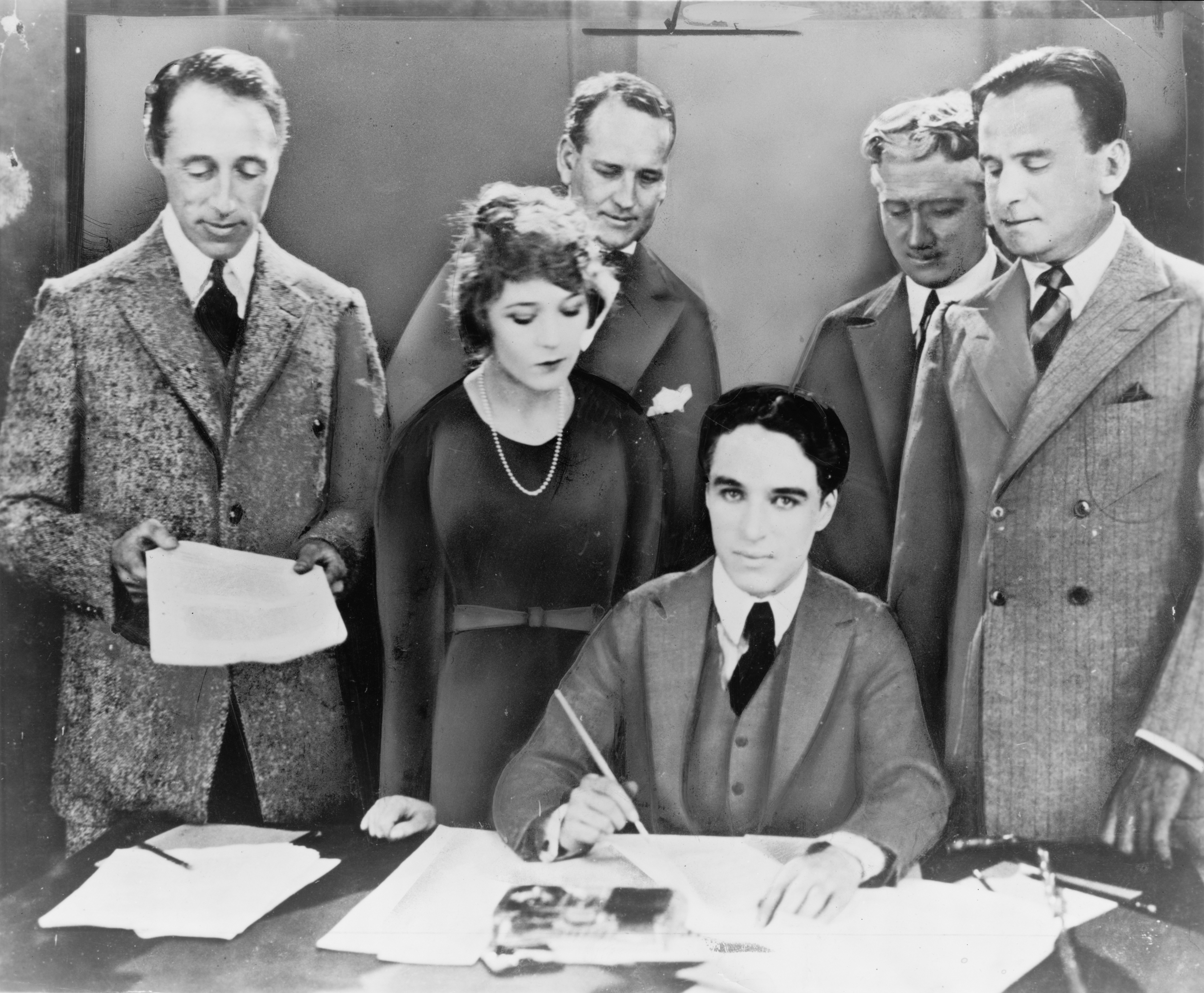
D. W. Griffith, Mary Pickford, Charlie Chaplin (seated), and Douglas Fairbanks at the signing of the contract establishing United Artists. Lawyers Albert Banzhaf (left) and Dennis F. O'Brien (right) stand in the background.

- Battle of Kiev – The Red Army captured Kiev.
- The Ukrainian Soviet Socialist Republic established the Donets Governorate. It would eventually be abolished in 1925.
- Battle of Rawicz – Polish rebel forces launched a second attempt to capture Rawicz in Greater Poland after German defenders repelled the first assault.
- The 9th Battalion of the Royal Queensland Regiment was disbanded after the last members of the unit returned to Australia.
- Charlie Chaplin, Mary Pickford, Douglas Fairbanks and D. W. Griffith launched United Artists.
- German air carrier Deutsche Luft-Reederei began offering regular flights between Berlin and Weimar, using AEG and DFW aircraft.
- Born:
  - Red Buttons, American actor, known for his comedic and dramatic roles in Hatari!, The Poseidon Adventure and Pete's Dragon, recipient of the Academy Award for Best Supporting Actor for Sayonara; as Aaron Chwatt, in New York City, United States (d. 2006)
  - Cornelia Fort, American air force officer, member of the Women Airforce Service Pilots during World War II; in Nashville, Tennessee, United States (d. 1943, killed in an air crash)
  - Tim Holt, American actor, best known for his film roles in The Magnificent Ambersons and The Treasure of the Sierra Madre; as Charles John Holt III, in Beverly Hills, California, United States (d. 1973)
  - Andreas Papandreou, Greek state leader, 3rd and 8th Prime Minister of Greece during the Third Hellenic Republic; in Chios, Kingdom of Greece (present-day Greece) (d. 1996)
- Died: William Michael Rossetti, 89, English writer, member of the Pre-Raphaelite Brotherhood (b. 1829)

== February 6, 1919 (Thursday) ==
- Over 65,000 workers went on strike in Seattle, inciting the First Red Scare in the United States.
- Battle of Rawicz – German forces repelled a second Polish assault to take Rawicz in Greater Poland.
- The 167th and 169th Infantry Brigades of the British Army were disbanded.
- Convicted war criminal Mehmed Reshid, who was governor of Diyarbekir vilayet in the Ottoman Empire during the Armenian genocide, was cornered by authorities after escaping from prison a few days earlier in Constantinople. He shot himself rather than be retaken into custody.
- Sports club Spikkestad was established in the Røyken, Norway. It merged with Røyken in 1963 to become Spikkestad & Røyken (ROS). The club now offers football, handball, cycling, tennis, gymnastics, volleyball and skiing.
- Born: Josef Stalder, Swiss gymnast, gold and silver medalist in the 1948 Summer Olympics, silver and bronze medalist in the 1952 Summer Olympics (d. 1991)
- Died: Angel De Cora, 47, American indigenous artist, known for promoting Ho-Chunk art, instructor at the Carlisle Indian Industrial School; died of influenza (b. 1871)

== February 7, 1919 (Friday) ==
- The city of Seattle added 600 men to the Seattle Police Force and hired another 2,400 deputies to counter the Seattle General Strike. Federal troops were summoned by the state attorney general of Washington to keep order in the city, along with 950 U.S. Navy sailors and marines. Seattle Mayor Ole Hanson also threatened to use 1,500 police and 1,500 troops to replace striking workers, but did not carry the threat out.
- British paddle steamer HMS Erin's Isle struck a naval mine left over from World War I off Nore, England, killed 23 passengers and crew on-board while another 28 survivors were rescued.
- The Michigan Supreme Court ruled Henry Ford had to run the Ford Motor Company for the interest of the shareholders, the first major legal citation of the shareholder primacy in corporate America.
- Swedish airline Svensk Lufttrafik was established in Stockholm. While its operation was very short, it had briefly employed former German ace and future Nazi leader Hermann Göring.
- Garfield County, Montana was established with its seat in Jordan.
- Jerome County, Idaho was established with its seat in Jerome.
- Born:
  - Desmond Doss, American army medical officer, recipient of the Medal of Honor and two Bronze Star Medals while being a conscientious objector during the Battle of Okinawa, subject of the documentary The Conscientious Objector and the war film Hacksaw Ridge; in Lynchburg, Virginia, United States (d. 2006)
  - Jock Mahoney, American actor and stuntman, best known for his lead in the television westerns The Range Rider and Yancy Derringer; as Jacques Joseph O'Mahoney, in Chicago, United States (d. 1989)
  - Robert F. Yonash, American aviation engineer, member of the start-up team for Temco Aircraft, co-founder of the Intercontinental Manufacturing Company; in Wadena, Minnesota, United States (d. 1997)

== February 8, 1919 (Saturday) ==
- Several striking transit workers returned to work to restore critical city transportation services in Seattle following three days of striking that shut down the city.
- French pilot Lucien Bossoutrot completed the first commercial flight between London and Paris, flying a Goliath that carried 12 passengers from Toussus-le-Noble, France, to RAF Kenley, England.
- The first outlet of the public library system OBA opened in Amsterdam.
- The Boca Juniors defeated Rosario Central 1–0 in the final football match to win the Copa Ibarguren championship in Buenos Aires.

== February 9, 1919 (Sunday) ==
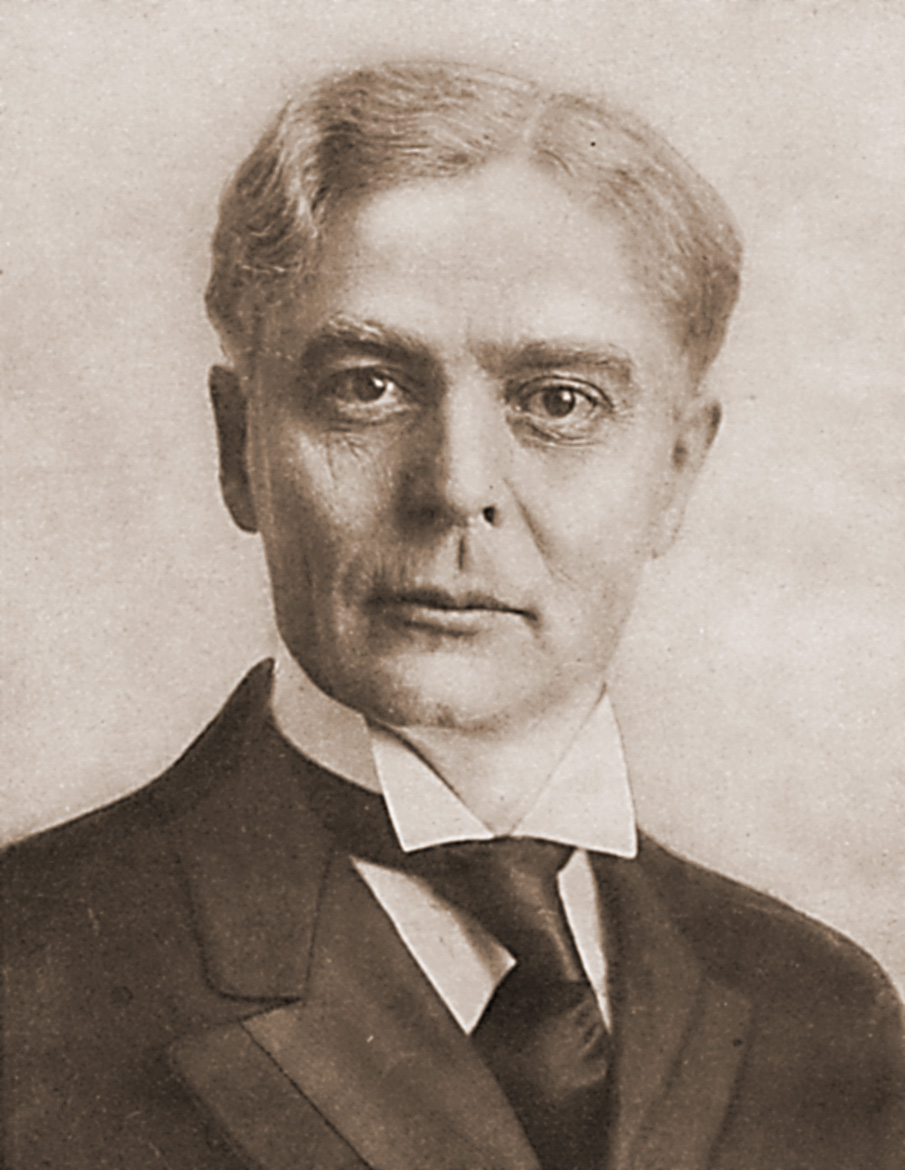
Ole Hanson, Mayor of Seattle

- Seattle Mayor Ole Hanson attributed the Seattle General Strike to the Russian Revolution and stated to the news press that "any man who attempts to take over the control of the municipal government functions will be shot."
- The American women's suffrage group Silent Sentinels burned an effigy of U.S. President Woodrow Wilson in front of the White House during a public campaign to pressure the American government to pass a constitutional amendment extending voting rights to women, which had been returned to the Senate for another vote.
- Berne International was established in Bern, Switzerland to re-establish the Second International socialist organization, which had dissolved in 1916, to act as counterpart to Communist International.
- The Holy Trinity Russian Orthodox Church was established in Baltimore by a congregation of Belarusian immigrants.
- The British Columbia Amateur Hockey Association was established in Victoria, British Columbia as the governing body for amateur hockey associations throughout the Canadian province, and eventually the Yukon.

== February 10, 1919 (Monday) ==
- The strike committee voted to end the general strike in Seattle.
- An amendment to the U.S. Constitution that would extend voting rights to women lost by only one vote in the United States Senate.
- The Inter-Allied Women's Conference, convened to compile a list of women's issues to present to the delegates of the Paris Peace Conference, since they were barred from the official conference.
- Battle of Rawicz – German forces failed to end the Polish siege on Rawicz in Greater Poland.
- German submarine SM UC-91 foundered in the North Sea while on en route for formal surrender with the loss of seventeen of her crew.
- Nankai University was established, initially as a private institution, in Tianjin, China.
- The Broken Hill railway line in New South Wales, Australia was extended, with stations Euabalong West and Mount Hope serving the line.
- Born: Bob Montgomery, American boxer, World Lightweight Champion from 1943 to 1944; in Sumter, South Carolina, United States (d. 1998)

== February 11, 1919 (Tuesday) ==
- Friedrich Ebert was elected as the first President of Germany by the Weimar National Assembly, beating challenger Arthur von Posadowsky-Wehner by a landslide of 277 to 49 votes and becoming the first democratically elected leader of Germany.
- The Seattle General Strike formally ended after shutting down the city for five days.
- Caribou County, Idaho was established with its seat in Soda Springs.
- Liberty County, Montana was established with its seat in Chester.
- The sports club Glassverket was established in Drammen, Norway. The club offers competitive football and handball.
- Born:
  - Eva Gabor, Hungarian American actress, best known for lead her role in the 1960s television comedy Green Acres; in Budapest, First Hungarian Republic (present-day Hungary) (d. 1995)
  - Tom Leigh, Australian air force officer, member of the No. 76 Squadron during World War II, member of the escape team from the German POW camp Stalag Luft III; in Waverley, New South Wales, Australia (d. 1944, executed)
- Died: John Hood, 59, American naval officer, commander of USS Hawk during the Spanish–American War and USS Texas during World War I; died of Bright's disease (b. 1859)

== February 12, 1919 (Wednesday) ==
- Soldiers with the Czechoslovak Legion opened fire on unarmed ethnic German and Hungarian demonstrators of Bratislava protesting against the city's incorporation into Czechoslovakia.
- The United States Navy closed its air naval base at Berehaven, Ireland following the end of World War I.
- Beta Alpha Psi was founded as an honor society for accounting and financial students at the University of Illinois.
- Born:
  - Forrest Tucker, American actor, better known for his role in 1960s television comedy F Troop; in Plainfield, Indiana, United States (d. 1986)
  - Ferruccio Valcareggi, Italian football player and manager, midfielder for clubs including Fiorentina and Bologna from 1937 to 1954; in Trieste, Kingdom of Italy (present-day Italy) (d. 2005)
  - Russell L. Ackoff, American academic, developed the concepts of operations research and systems theory; in Philadelphia, United States (d. 2009)
- Died:
  - Joseph Arch, 92, British politician, architect of the Representation of the People Act (b. 1826)
  - Harold Gilman, 43, British painter, founding member of the Camden Town Group (b. 1876)

== February 13, 1919 (Thursday) ==
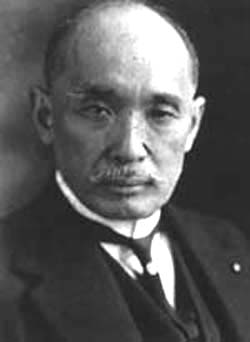
Japanese diplomat Makino Nobuaki

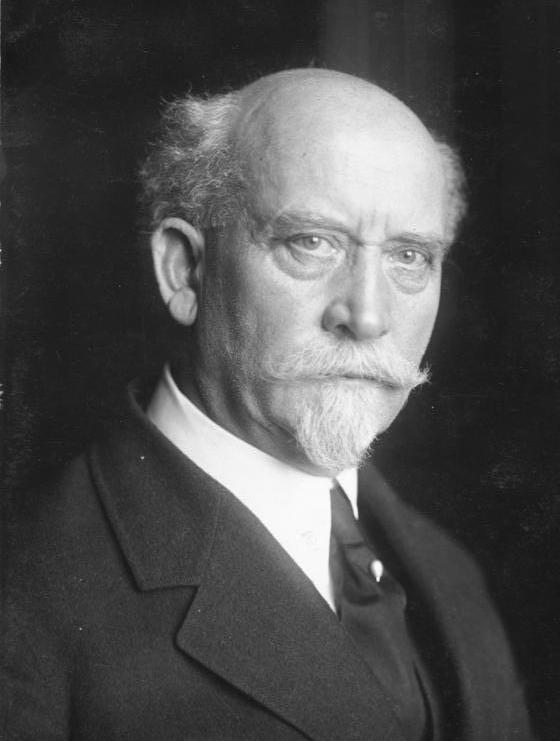
Philipp Scheidemann, Chancellor of Germany

- Paris Peace Conference – Japan proposed the inclusion of a "racial equality clause" in the Covenant of the League of Nations.
- The first democratically elected governing body of Germany was established, with a cabinet under Philipp Scheidemann being the first administration of the Weimar Republic.
- Portugal's Monarchy of the North ended after civilians in Porto revolted, with support from the National Republican Guard.
- The Social Democratic Party won a majority of the parliament seats in the elections in Abkhazia.
- Concrete cutting and drilling tools manufacturer Tyrolit was established in Schwaz, Austria.
- The sports club Rivadavia was established in Comodoro Rivadavia, Argentina, with basketball and handball programs.
- Born:
  - Tennessee Ernie Ford, American country musician, known for his country hits "The Shotgun Boogie" and "Sixteen Tons" and the 1950s television variety series The Ford Show; as Ernest Jennings Ford, in Bristol, Tennessee, United States (d. 1991)
  - Joan Edwards, American singer, best known for her work on the radio show Your Hit Parade and her collaborations with Paul Whiteman; in New York City, United States (d. 1981)
  - Eddie Robinson, American football coach, head of the Grambling State Tigers football and basketball teams from 1941 to 1997, held the record for most season wins in the NCAA Division I; in Jackson, Louisiana, United States (d. 2007)
  - William Nierenberg, American physicist, member of the Manhattan Project and director of the Scripps Institution of Oceanography from 1965 to 1986, co-founder of the George C. Marshall Institute; in New York City, United States (d. 2000)
- Died: Matteo Albertone, 78, Italian army officer, commander of Italian forces at the Battle of Adwa during the First Italo-Ethiopian War (b. 1840)

== February 14, 1919 (Friday) ==
- The Polish–Soviet War began with the Battle of Bereza Kartuska, with Polish forces capturing 80 soldiers with the Red Army at what is now the town of Byaroza, Belarus.
- The National Council of Georgia was dissolved for the first free elections in the Democratic Republic of Georgia, which also included women participating for the first time in national voting.
- Died: Joseph J. Kinyoun, 58, American public servant, founder of the United States' Hygienic Laboratory, the predecessor of the National Institutes of Health (b. 1860)

== February 15, 1919 (Saturday) ==
- A unit with the paramilitary organization Haidamaka massacred 1,500 Jewish villagers in Proskurov, Ukraine, supposedly under orders of Symon Petliura, president of the Ukrainian People's Republic.
- General John J. Pershing and Theodore Roosevelt Jr., eldest son of the late U.S. President Theodore Roosevelt, organized a dinner between non-career and career military officers at the Paris YMCA to discuss creating a new organization for American servicemen involved in World War I, eventually leading to the creation of the American Legion.
- The sports club Ingolstadt was established in Ingolstadt, Germany where it now hosts 21 sports programs.
- The United States Navy closed its air naval base at Wexford, Ireland following the end of World War I.

== February 16, 1919 (Sunday) ==
- A prolongation of the ceasefire between the Allies and Germany helped end most of the major fighting between the Germans and Polish rebels in Greater Poland, although skirmishes continued until the signing of the Treaty of Versailles on June 28.
- Yugoslav troops massacred 432 Albanians in Rugova, Albania. The atrocities were reported by the Committee for the National Defence of Kosovo.
- The Social Democratic Party of Austria won a majority of the seats in elections for the Austrian Constituent Assembly, the first since the end of the World War I and the establishment of the Republic of German-Austria (later shortened to Austria). It was also the first time Austrian women could participate in elections, and eight women were elected to assembly, including Anna Boschek, Emmy Freundlich, Adelheid Popp, Gabriele Proft, Therese Schlesinger, Amalie Seidel, Maria Tusch, and Hildegard Burjan.
- The Social-Democratic Party won the first free elections held in the Democratic Republic of Georgia and formed the first Constituent Assembly of Georgia. It was also the first time Georgian women participated in national voting.
- The Yugoslav Muslim Organization was established in Sarajevo by Yugoslav leader Mehmed Spaho.
- Football club Shkodër was established in Shkodër, Albania.
- Died:
  - Eva Luckes, 64, English nurse, matron of the Royal London Hospital from 1880 to 1919 (b. 1854)
  - Mark Sykes, 39, British diplomat, leading adviser on Middle East relations to the David Lloyd George administration, co-architect of the Sykes–Picot Agreement; died of influenza (b. 1879)
  - Vera Kholodnaya, 25, Russian actress, known for her film roles in The Woman Who Invented Love and Song of Triumphant Love; died of influenza (b. 1893)

== February 17, 1919 (Monday) ==
- Wilfrid Laurier, leader of the Liberal Party of Canada, Leader of the Opposition and formerly the seventh Prime Minister of Canada, died two years after his defeat in the federal election against Robert Borden. He was the fourth longest serving prime minister in Canadian history and longest-serving leader of a Canadian political party.
- Two football clubs were formed in Germany: Bahrenfelder in Bahrenfeld, Hamburg, and Heidingsfeld. in Würzburg.
- Died: Robert Atkinson Gibson, 72, American clergy, sixth Bishop of the Episcopal Church in Virginia (b. 1846)

== February 18, 1919 (Tuesday) ==
- British troops deployed to control a violent strike in Glasgow were recalled from Scotland.
- Born:
  - Jack Palance, American actor, known for his memorable performances in Western and thriller films including Panic in the Streets, Sudden Fear and Shane, recipient of Academy Award for Best Supporting Actor for City Slickers; as Volodymyr Ivanovych Palahniuk, in Hazleton, Pennsylvania, United States (d. 2006)
  - Amir-Abbas Hoveyda, Iranian state leader, 42nd Prime Minister of Iran; in Tehran, Sublime State of Persia (present-day Iran) (d. 1979, executed)
- Died:
  - Henry Ragas, 28, American jazz musician, pianist for the Original Dixieland Jass Band; died of influenza (b. 1891)
  - Ōyama Sutematsu, 58, Japanese academic, first woman to receive a college degree in Japan; died of influenza (b. 1860)

== February 19, 1919 (Wednesday) ==
- Queen Margaret College was established in Wellington, New Zealand as a school for girls from Years 1 to 13 (ages 5 to 18).
- Sports club Ski was established in Ski, Norway, with programs in football, handball, track and field, floorball, ice hockey, tennis and gymnastics.
- Born:
  - Ross King, Canadian hockey player, goaltender and goal medalist for the Canadian hockey team at the 1948 Winter Olympics; in Portage la Prairie, Manitoba, Canada (d. 1972)
  - Tikkavarapu Pattabhirama Reddy, Indian film director, known for films including Samskara; in Nellore, British India (present-day India) (d. 2006)
- Died:
  - Frederick DuCane Godman, 85, British biologist, best known for research into the flora and fauna of Central America (b. 1834)
  - Fukushima Yasumasa, 66, Japanese army officer, noted commander during the First Sino-Japanese War and Russo-Japanese War, recipient of the Order of the Bath (b. 1852)
  - I. C. Frimu, 47, Romanian journalist and politician, founder of the newspaper România Muncitoare, founding member of the Social Democratic Party of Romania (b. 1871)

== February 20, 1919 (Thursday) ==
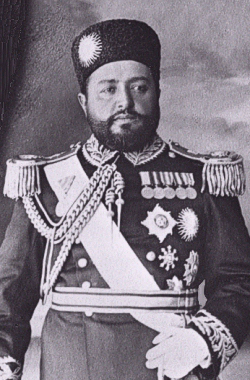
Habibullah Khan, Emir of Afghanistan

- Habibullah Khan, Emir of Afghanistan, was assassinated by Mustafa Seghir, an Indian spy employed by the United Kingdom.
- The Banat Republic was formally dissolved, allowing Romania and Yugoslavia to divide up territory in the region.
- German submarine SM UC-71 foundered in the North Sea while en route for surrender.
- Communist demonstrators in Budapest raided the newspaper office of The People's Voice, the official paper of the Social Democratic Party of Hungary. Seven people, including police officers, were killed in the violence. As a result, the Hungarian government began arresting leaders of the Socialist Party of Hungary and banning their publication Vörös Újság (Red News).
- The 1st Legions Infantry Division of the Polish Army was established using veterans of the Polish Legions that served in World War I.
- The Nebraska Capitol Commission was established to address deteriorating building conditions around the Nebraska State Capitol.
- Born:
  - Joe Krol, Canadian football player, quarterback for the Toronto Argonauts from 1945 to 1952, six times Grey Cup champion; in Hamilton, Ontario, Canada (d. 2008)
  - Hugh Culverhouse, American sports executive, owner of the Tampa Bay Buccaneers from 1974 to 1994; in Birmingham, Alabama, United States (d. 1994)
  - Lursakdi Sampatisiri, Thai business leader, founder of the Hilton Bangkok; as Lursakdi Sreshthaputa, in Bangkok, Thailand (d. 2010)
- Died: Francisco Tongio Liongson, 49, Filipino politician, 4th Governor of Pampanga, member of the Senate of the Philippines from 1916 to 1919 (b. 1869)

== February 21, 1919 (Friday) ==
Kurt Eisner

- Kurt Eisner, leader of the People's State of Bavaria, was shot dead by German nationalist Anton Graf von Arco auf Valley while on his way to the legislature where he planned to announce his resignation as head of state.
- Nasrullah Khan became Emir of Afghanistan after his older brother Habibullah Khan was murdered the previous day.
- The 2nd Legions Infantry Division was established by the Polish Army.
- The first American fighter plane, the Thomas-Morse, made its first test flight for the United States Army Air Service.
- The American Radio and Research Corporation began broadcasting radio signals from their experimental broadcasting station 1XE in Medford, Massachusetts with the SS George Washington as it approached Boston, which was carrying U.S. President Woodrow Wilson back from the Paris Peace Conference.
- Georgian composer Zacharia Paliashvili premiered his opera Abesalom da Eteri at the Tbilisi Opera and Ballet Theatre in Tbilisi. Based on the medieval Georgian folk poem Eteriani, the opera combined Georgian folk songs with traditional 19th-century Romantic themes. Because of its popularity, passages of the opera were adapted as the National Anthem of Georgia in 2004.
- Swedish composer Wilhelm Peterson-Berger premiered his opera The Doomsday Prophets at the Royal Swedish Opera in Stockholm.
- Born: Kehat Shorr, Romanian-Israeli athletics coach, head coach of the Israeli Olympic team for the 1972 Summer Olympics, one of the 11 victims in the Munich massacre; in Șuici, Kingdom of Romania (present-day Romania) (d. 1972, murdered)
- Died:
  - John O'Connor Power, 73, Irish politician, Member of Parliament for County Mayo from 1874 to 1885, member of the Home Rule League (b. 1846)
  - Mary Edwards Walker, 86, American activist, only female recipient of the Medal of Honor for her role as an army surgeon during the American Civil War (b. 1832)
  - Alice Wheeldon, 53, British activist, leading member of the Women's Social and Political Union; died of influenza (b. 1866)

== February 22, 1919 (Saturday) ==
- A convention on Irish Home Rule was held in Philadelphia, leading to the formation of the American Commission on Irish Independence that would lobby for Irish independence efforts at the Paris Peace Conference.
- Women were able to run as candidates in elections for the first time for seats in the Parliament for the Isle of Man, though property restrictions for voters continued until 1969.
- German submarine SM U-21 foundered in the North Sea while being towed for surrender.
- The United States Navy closed its air naval base at Foyle, Ireland following the end of World War I.
- The Pebble Beach Golf Links opened in Pebble Beach, California.
- Born: Mary Maguire, Australian actress, known for her roles in Heritage and The Outsider; as Ellen Theresa Maguire, in Melbourne, Australia (d. 1974)

== February 23, 1919 (Sunday) ==
- An estimated 50,000 spectators witnessed the state funeral procession of former Canadian prime minister Wilfrid Laurier as it made its way to Notre Dame Cemetery in Ottawa.
- The Latvian National Theatre officially opened in Riga.
- Born: Johnny Carey, Irish football player, defender for Manchester United and the Republic of Ireland national football team from 1936 to 1953; in Dublin, Ireland (d. 1995)

== February 24, 1919 (Monday) ==
- The United States Congress established the American Relief Administration with a budget of $100 million, later matched with another $100 million in private donations, to fund and organize relief aid to 23 European countries devastated by World War I.
- The Bank of Estonia was established by the provisional government to distribute the new Estonian mark currency.
- Konstantin Päts, Prime Minister of Estonia, established the Cross of Liberty to honor those that served in the Estonian War of Independence.
- Born:
  - Nellie Connally, American social leader, 46th First Lady of Texas, wife to John Connally, passenger in the Presidential Limousine during the assassination of John F. Kennedy; as Idanell Brill, in Austin, Texas, United States (d. 2006)
  - John Carl Warnecke, American architect, designer of many public buildings and monuments including the Hawaii State Capitol, the John F. Kennedy Eternal Flame grave site, and Lafayette Square, Washington, D.C.; in Oakland, California, United States (d. 2010)

== February 25, 1919 (Tuesday) ==
- An air traffic committee made up of representatives from 36 states in the British Empire under the Council of Defence met for the first time.
- Oregon placed a one cent per US gallon (0.26¢/liter) tax on gasoline, becoming the first U.S. state to levy a gasoline tax.
- William Hale Thompson retained his seat as Mayor of Chicago during city elections.
- The 13th Infantry Division of the United States Army was disbanded.
- Aircraft manufacturer Aero Vodochody was established in Prague, where it became known for its military aircraft.
- Born:
  - Karl H. Pribram, Austrian-American medical scientist, developed the holonomic brain theory; in Vienna, Republic of German-Austria (present-day Austria) (d. 2015)
  - Monte Irvin, American baseball player, left fielder for the Newark Eagles and New York Giants 1938 to 1955, 1954 World Series champion; as Monford Merrill Irvin, in Haleburg, Alabama, United States (d. 2016)
  - Clarence Seignoret, Dominican state leader, third President of Dominica; in Roseau, Dominica (d. 2002)

== February 26, 1919 (Wednesday) ==
- The Grand Canyon National Park was officially established, finally fulfilling efforts to establish the natural area as a national park that had been ongoing since 1882.
- The Maine Senate passed a resolution allowing women to vote for candidates in the United States Electoral College.
- Lafayette National Park was established near Bar Harbor, Maine, with the name attributed to American Revolution leader Marquis de Lafayette. It was later renamed Acadia National Park in 1929.
- Born: Constant Tonegaru, Romanian artist and poet, member of the Sburătorul literary movement; in Galați, Kingdom of Romania (present-day Romania) (d. 1952)
- Died: Anne Isabella Thackeray Ritchie, 81, English writer, author of Mrs. Dymond and From An Island, daughter of William Makepeace Thackeray (b. 1837)

== February 27, 1919 (Thursday) ==
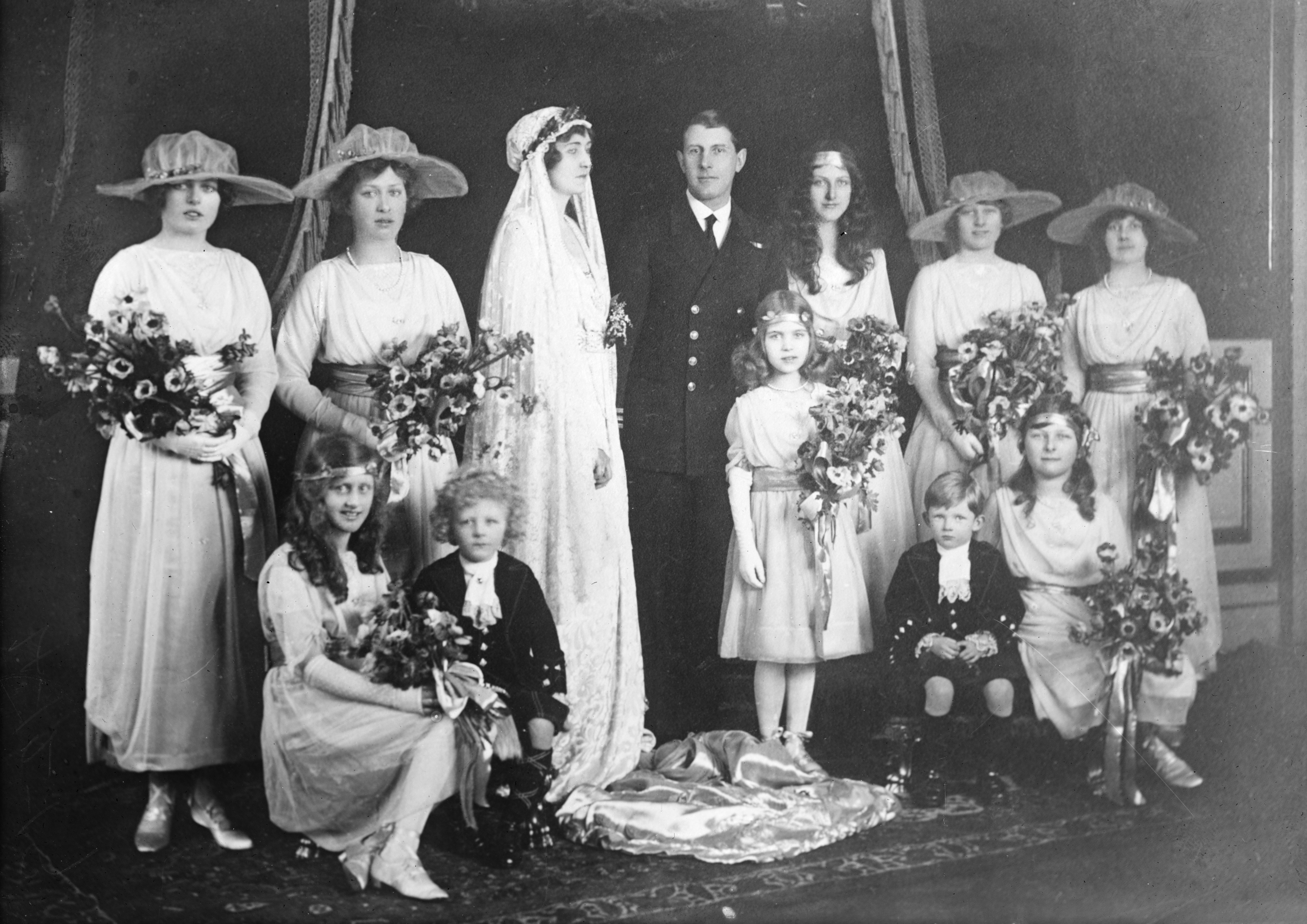
Wedding party of Princess Patricia of Connaught and Royal Navy officer Alexander Ramsay at Westminster Abbey.

- Princess Patricia of Connaught married Royal Navy officer Alexander Ramsay, who was from a common background, in the first royal wedding held at Westminster Abbey since the 14th century.
- The World War I song "How Ya Gonna Keep 'em Down on the Farm (After They've Seen Paree)?" became one of the biggest music hits of the year, starting with Victor Records releasing a single by Arthur Fields, followed by another single by Nora Bayes and Billy Murray in March. A jazz version by James Reese Europe released through Pathé Records was also popular.
- The oldest newspaper in Abkhazia, the Apsny, was established with national poet Dmitry Gulia as editor.
- Born: Johnny Pesky, American baseball player, shortstop and third baseman for the Boston Red Sox, Detroit Tigers and Washington Senators from 1942 to 1954; as John Michael Paveskovich, in Portland, Oregon, United States (d. 2012)
- Died:
  - George F. Edmunds, 91, American politician, U.S. Senator from Vermont from 1866 to 1891 (b. 1828)
  - Robert Harris, 69, Welsh-born Canadian painter, known for his portrait of the Fathers of Confederation of Canada (b. 1848)
  - George A. Porterfield, 96, American army officer, commander of the 25th Virginia Infantry Regiment during the American Civil War (b. 1822)

== February 28, 1919 (Friday) ==
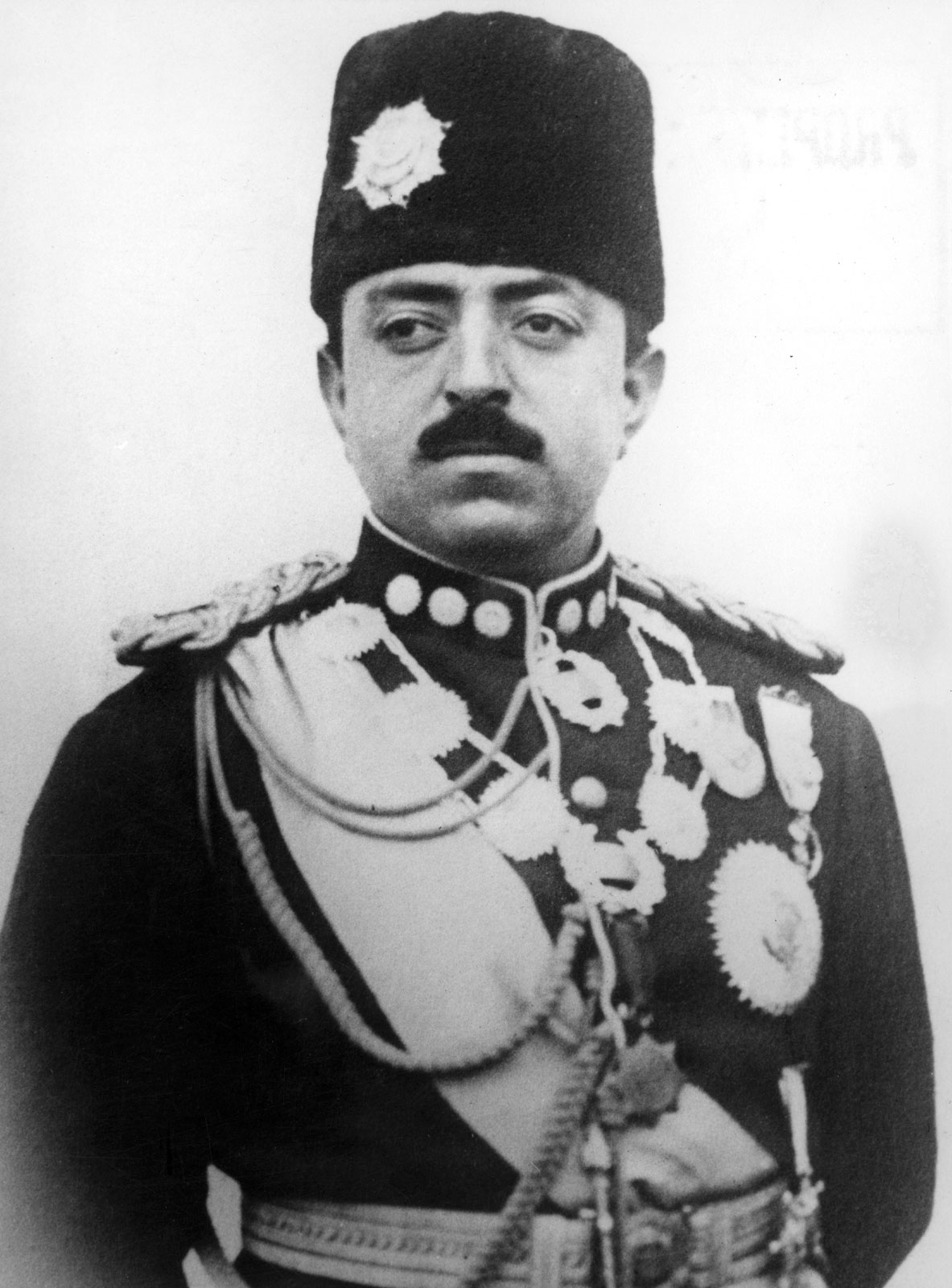
Amanullah Khan, new Emir of Afghanistan

- The Soviet republics of Lithuania and Byelorussia merged to become the Socialist Soviet Republic of Lithuania and Belorussia, with the capital in Vilnius (although it was moved to Minsk in April).
- Paris Peace Conference – The Allies informed Hungary of a new demarcation line in Transylvania that would allow Romania to advance more of its armed forces to occupy territory, with a demilitarized zone of 5 km west of the line to ensure the cities of Szatmátnémeti, Nagyvárad and Arad would not be occupied by Romanian forces.
- Amanullah Khan overthrew his brother Nasrullah Khan to become Emir of Afghanistan.
- An independence mission to the United States, funded by the Philippine legislature, set out from Manila to present a case for sovereignty for the Philippines to U.S. Secretary of War Newton D. Baker.
- The student newspaper The Mirror was first published at the University of Northern Colorado.
- The Aurora football club was established in Busto Arsizio, Italy.
- The city of Calipatria, California was established.
- Born: Brian Urquhart, British diplomat, Under-Secretary-General of the United Nations from 1971 to 1985; in Dorset, England (d. 2021)
- Died: Daniel Russell Brown, 70, American politician, 43rd Governor of Rhode Island (b. 1848)
