= Antonin, Gmina Przygodzice =

Antonin
- Village
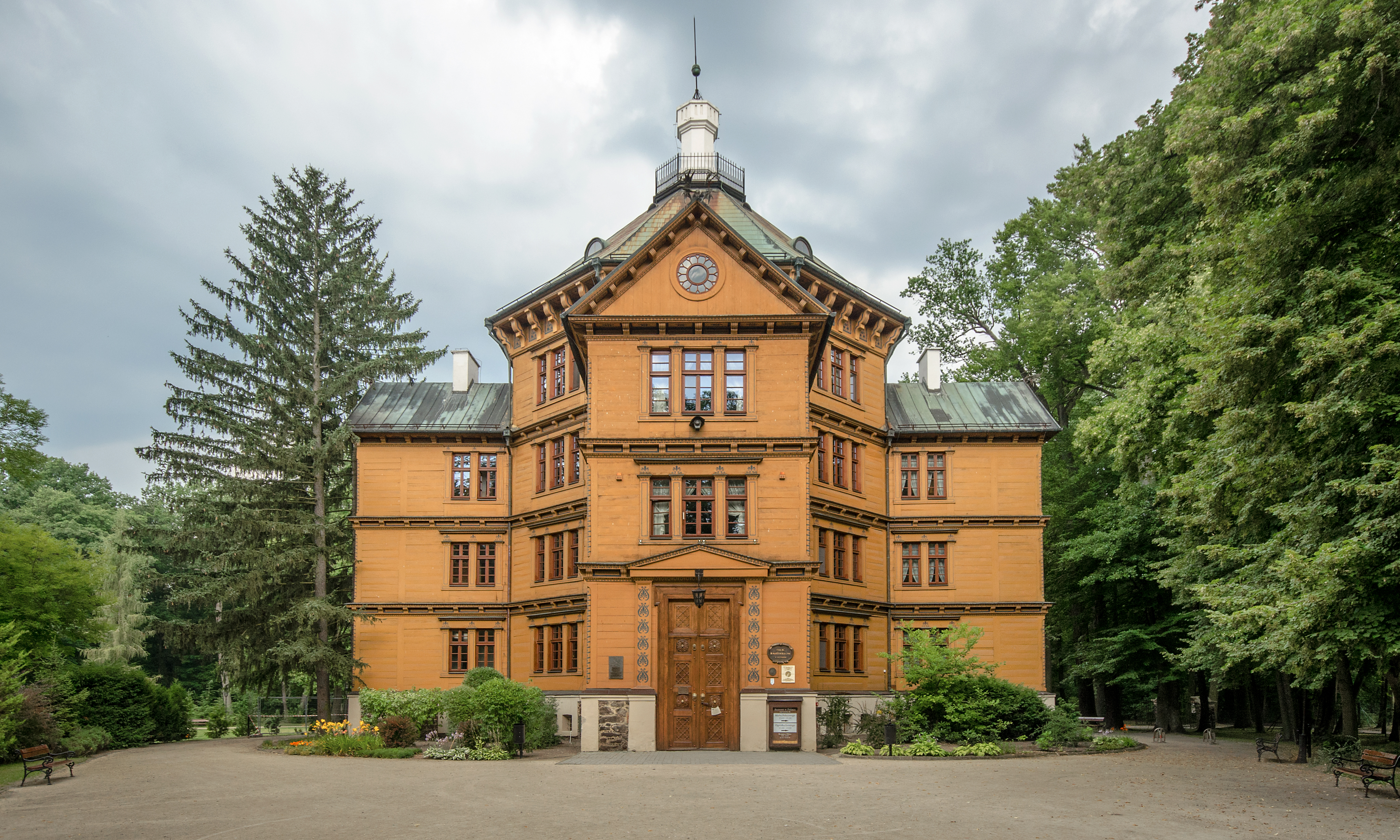
- Radziwiłł Palace in Antonin

- Location within Poland
- Coordinates: 51°31′4″N 17°51′17″E
- Country: Poland
- Voivodeship: Greater Poland
- County: Ostrów
- Gmina: Przygodzice
- Population (approx.): 470

Antonin (Polish pronunciation: [anˈtɔɲin]) is a village in the administrative district of Gmina Przygodzice, within Ostrów County, Greater Poland Voivodeship, in west-central Poland.

The village has an approximate population of 470.

== Radziwiłł Palace ==
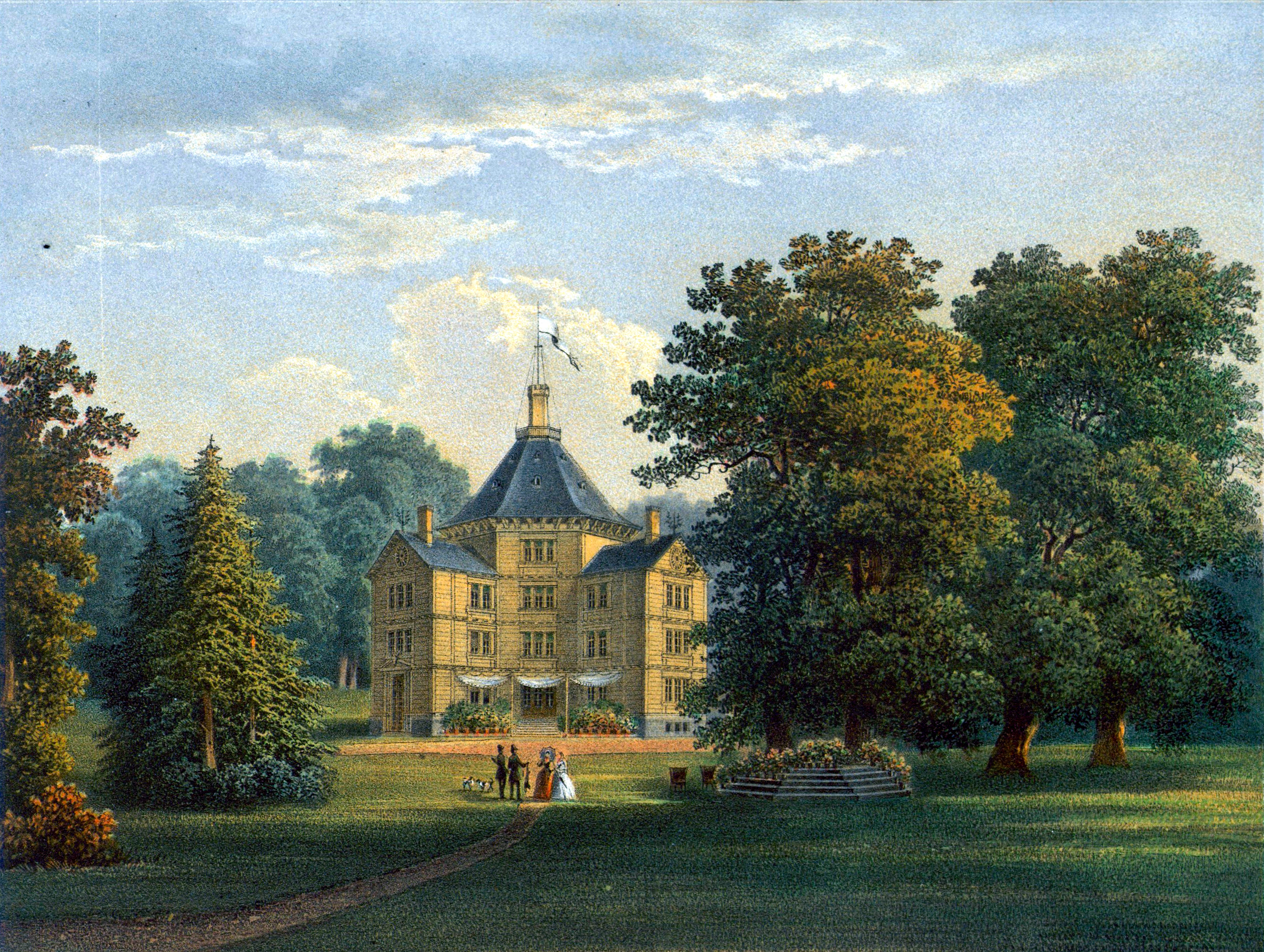
Radziwiłł Palace in Antonin, around 1860, edition by Alexander Duncker

The small wooden palace was built as a hunting lodge for Polish aristocrat Prince Antoni Radziwiłł between 1822 and 1824 by the German architect Karl Friedrich Schinkel, and named after its owner. In his later life, Antoni Radziwiłł and his wife Princess Louise of Prussia moved permanently to Antonin with two daughters Wanda and Eliza. Antoni Radziwiłł was a well-connected composer among European musical circles and with time transformed the Antonin property into a popular musical salon among greatest talents of the area such as Niccolò Paganini, Frédéric Chopin and Ludwig van Beethoven. Chopin gave music lessons to Antoni Radziwiłł's daughter Wanda during his stays at the property. During his stays with the Radziwiłł family, Chopin also had composed the Polonaise op.3 and Piano Trio Op. 8 and dedicated the latter to Radziwiłł. Antoni Radziwiłł also supported some of the artists financially, among them Fryderyk Chopin. Chopin's visits to Antonin property were documented by Henryk Siemiradzki in a photogravure titled "Chopin u księcia Radziwiłła" (eng: Chopin's visit to Prince Radziwiłł).

== Notable people ==
- Władysław Wawrzyniak (1890–1940), Polish military commander, recipients of the Virtuti Militari, Katyn massacre victim

== Gallery ==
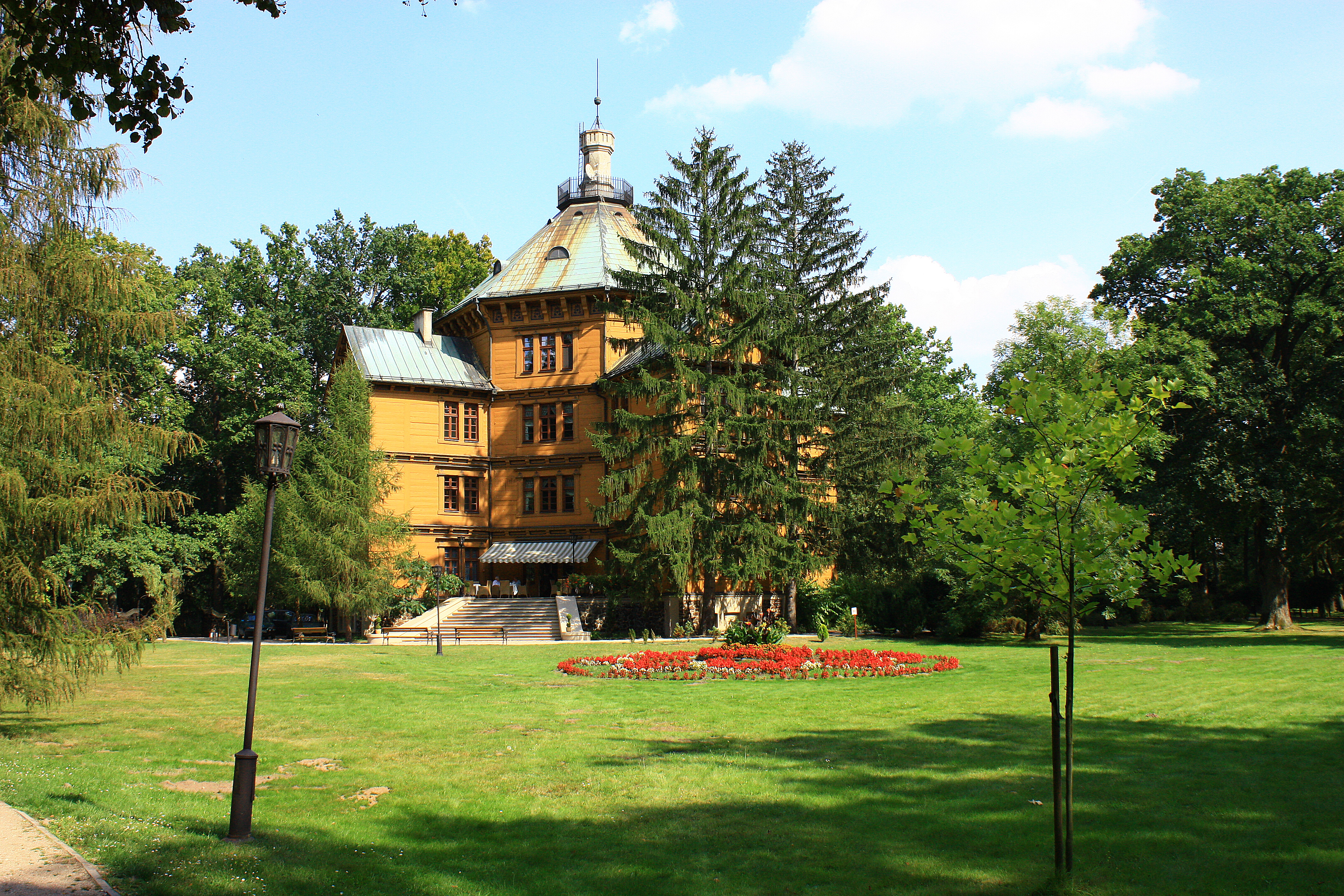
Park

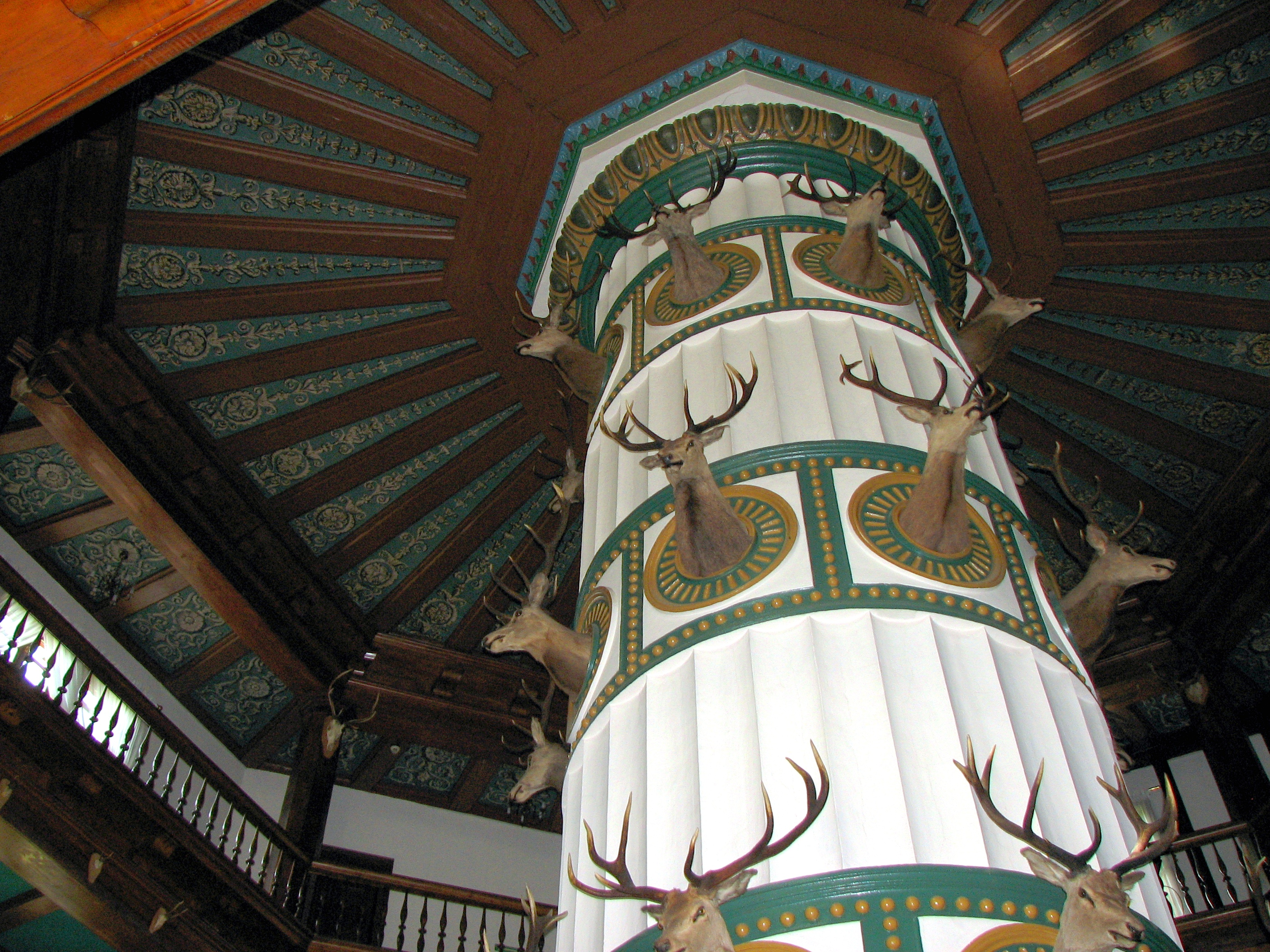
Radziwiłł Palace interior

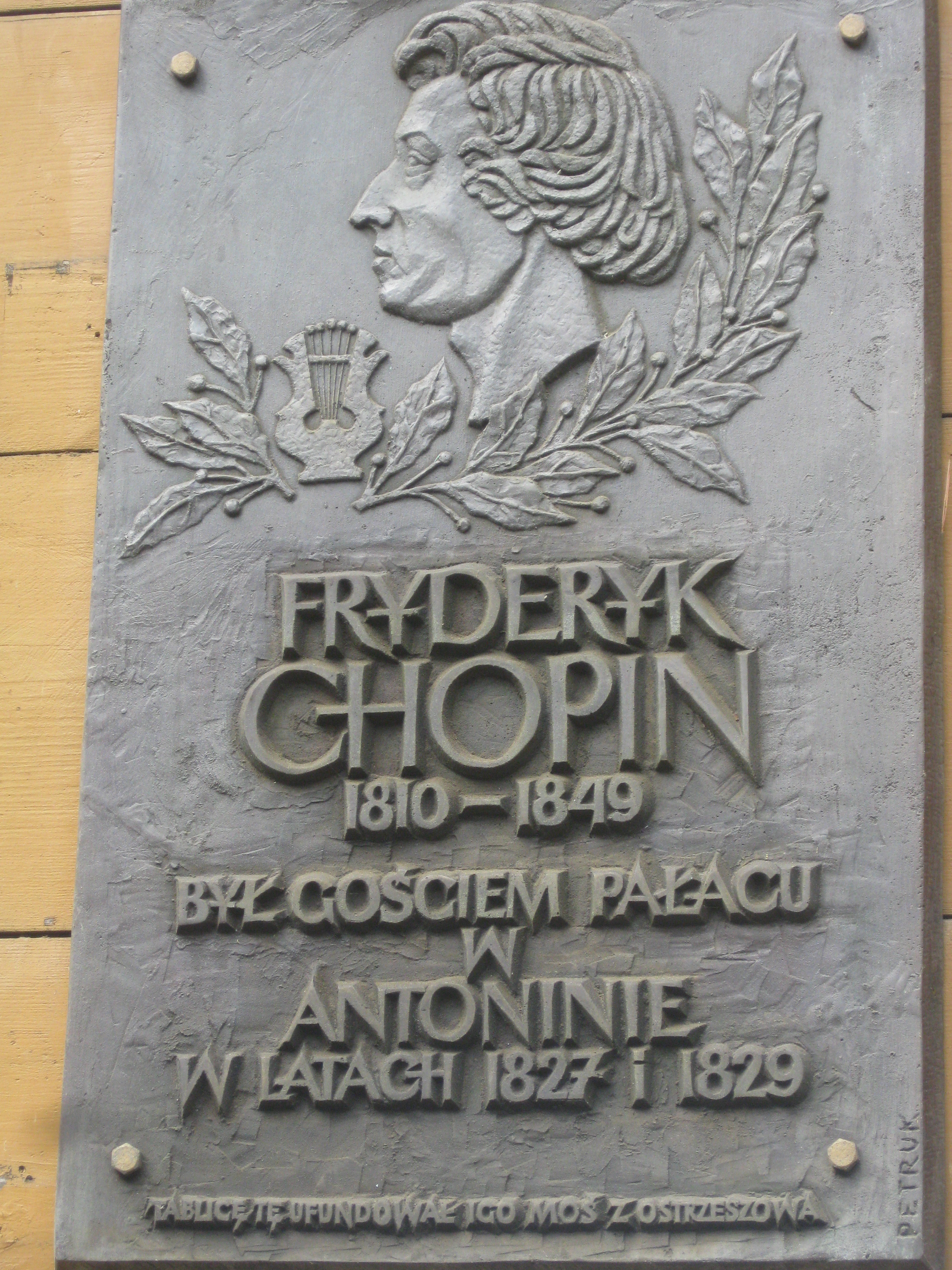
Plaque commemorating the visits of Fryderyk Chopin

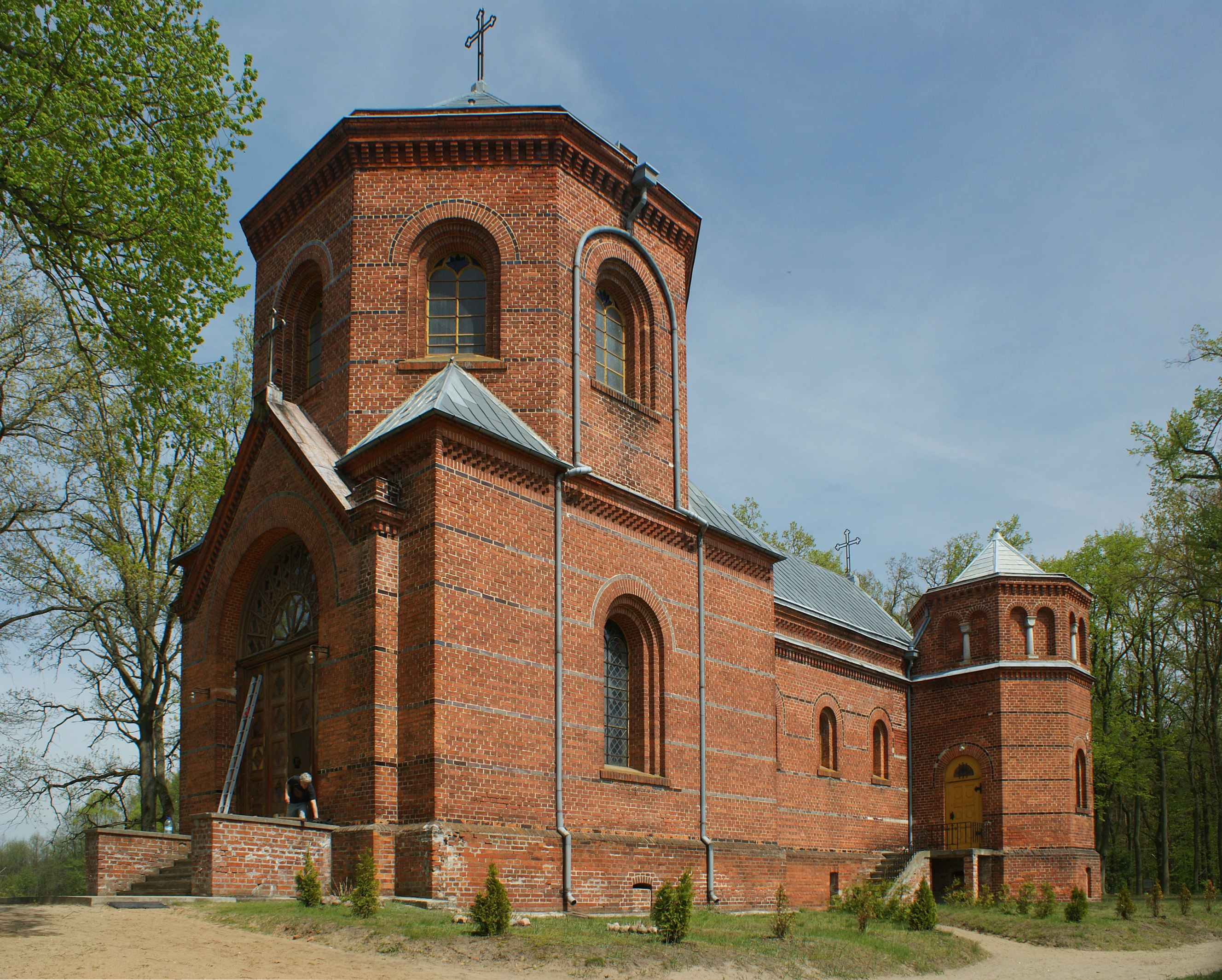
Our Lady of the Gate of Dawn church
