= Battle of Dolakovo =

| Date | February 1919 |
| Location | Ingushetia |
| Result | Russian victory |

Belligerents
| (Ingushetia) Ingush militias (Russian Soviet Federative Socialist Republic) 11th Army (RSFSR) (Russian Soviet Federative Socialist Republic) Ossetian Bolsheviks | (Russia) White Movement |

Commanders and leaders
| Mussa Sautiev; Evgenyi Kazanski | A.Geyman |

Strength
| (Ingushetia) (Russian Soviet Federative Socialist Republic) 10,000 militias, partisans, bolsheviks | 40,000 troops |

Casualties and losses
| 300 killed | 2,500 killed |

The Battle of Dolakovo (1919) was a confrontation between Ingush detachments and units of the Volunteer Army under General Anton Denikin during the Russian Civil War. The fighting took place on 2 February 1919 near the Ingush villages of Dolakovo and Kantyshevo and formed part of the White offensive toward Vladikavkaz.

== Background ==
In early February 1919, Denikin’s forces advanced in the North Caucasus with the aim of encircling Vladikavkaz, defeating Bolshevik forces, and securing control over Grozny. Units under Generals Andrei Shkuro and A. A. Geiman approached Ingush territory, intending to pass through the villages of Dolakovo and Kantyshevo.

The Ingush were presented with an ultimatum demanding free passage for White troops. The deadline was set for 10 a.m. the following day. The ultimatum was rejected.

Expecting to pass through Ingushetia without a fight, former Ingush officers aligned with the Whites arrived in Dolakovo and renewed the demand for passage. Colonel Beksultan Ismailovich Kotiev (Byatyrkhan) took part in negotiations with the elders and warned that the Ingush could not withstand Denikin’s well-armed troops, but his appeals failed. Yusup Albogachiev then urged the villagers not to trust the White officers and read a leaflet signed by General Shkuro calling on Cossacks and Ossetians to unite against the Ingush.

On 4 February 1919, a congress of the Ingush people convened in Bazorkino, gathering more than 10,000 armed participants. The congress expressed its determination to resist the White advance. A Defense Committee was elected to coordinate the resistance, including A. Gorchkhanov, Yu. Albogachiyev, I. Zyazikov, M. Sautiyev, A. Goygov, Kh. Ortskhanov, I. Malsagov, M. Uzhakhov, O. Malsagov, and T. Bogatyrev.

== Battle ==
On 2 February 1919, Denikin’s forces approached Vladikavkaz and the Ingush villages of Dolakovo and Kantyshevo. Fierce fighting erupted near Dolakovo. White cavalry initially attempted to break through Ingush defensive positions but suffered heavy losses and were forced to retreat. The Whites regrouped and subjected Dolakovo to intense artillery bombardment before launching renewed assaults. Fighting was particularly severe in the area of the Dolakovo cemetery. During the battle, several villagers were burned alive in their courtyards by Denikin’s forces.

Detachments from across the Ingush plain rushed to assist the defenders. Among the first to arrive were Zaam Islamovich Yandiev, Khizir Idigovich Ortskhanov, Ayup Dautievich Ganiev and Musa Elmurzaevich Malsagov.

The names of several participants in the fighting are recorded: Usman Kiev (Full Cavalier of the Cross of St. George and veteran of the First World War), Doshluko Malsagov (linguist and folklorist), Bozarko Yandiev (starshina of Dolakovo), Salman Oziev (poet and writer), Khusein Kartoev, Zoltarо Zariev, Beksultan Kostoev, and Bekmurza Azhigov), among others.

Despite repeated assaults, White forces did not succeed in establishing firm control over Dolakovo.

== Contemporary Assessments ==
In later memoirs, General Denikin acknowledged the resistance encountered in Ingushetia. He described the Ingush as a small but determined people and noted the refusal of local inhabitants to allow his forces to pass through their territory.

== See also ==
- Bibliography of the Russian Revolution and Civil War
- Outline of the Russian Revolution and Civil War
- Index of articles related to the Russian Revolution and Civil War
- The "Russian" Civil Wars, 1916–1926: Ten Years That Shook the World
- Russia in Flames: War, Revolution, Civil War, 1914–1921
- Russia in Revolution: An Empire in Crisis, 1890 to 1928
- Russia: Revolution and Civil War, 1917—1921
- The Russian Revolution: A New History

== Sources ==
- Severo-Kavkazskij front // Vechernee vremya (Rostov-na-Donu). – 13 May 1919 – № 268
- 4. V CHechenskom komitete // Tovarishch (Groznyj). - 1917. – 20 aprelya (2 maya). - No2.
