= Sarnowa, Rawicz =

Sarnowa
- Osiedle and Dzielnica
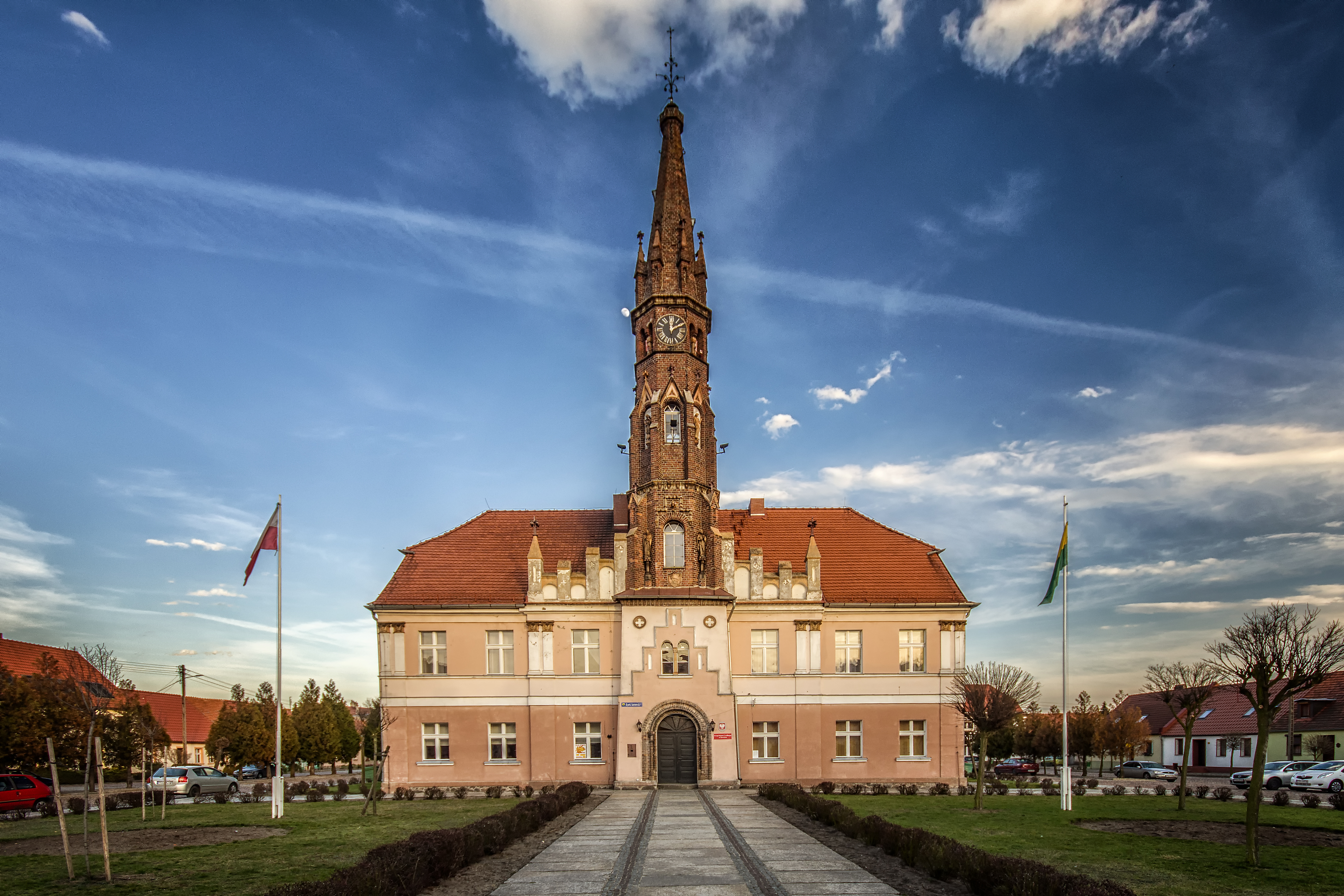
- Old Town Hall in Sarnowa

- Location within Poland Location within Greater Poland Voivodeship
- Coordinates: 51.631°N 16.907°E
- Country: Poland
- Voivodeship: Greater Poland
- County: Rawicz County
- Gmina: Gmina Rawicz
- Town: Rawicz
- First mentioned as a settlement: 1065
- First mentioned as a town: 7 June 1262
- Magdeburg Rights: 1407
- Incorporated as a neighbourhood: 1 January 1973

Government
  - Administrator: Grzegorz Kubik

Population (2010)
  - Total: 1,759
- Time zone: UTC+1 (CET)
  - Summer (DST): UTC+2 (CEST)
- Postal code: 63-900
- Telephone numbering plan: 65
- Vehicle registration plate: PRA
- SIMC: 0954610

Sarnowa (German: Sarne, Sarnau, Sarn), formerly a town in its own right, is a historic neighbourhood and administrative district in Rawicz, Poland, located in the northeastern part of the town.

== History ==
It was mentioned intermittently in various documents over the course of its history, with the first mention of a settlement was as far back as 1065, with another mention in 1110. It was mentioned in the Innocent II's papal Bull of Gniezno in 1136. In 1248 and 1262 it was mentioned in royal documentation, with the latter on 7 June the first mention of Sarnowa as a town, but formally received Magdeburg rights much later, in 1407.

Until 1 January 1973, when it became part of Rawicz by the decision of the Council of Ministers, it was a separate town in its own right.

== Landmarks ==
The historic landmarks of Sarnowa include the old Town Hall, the Baroque Saint Andrew the Apostle church, and the Eclectic manor house.

== Sports ==
The local football club is Sarnowianka Sarnowa. It competes in the lower leagues.
