= Battle of Rawicz =

- Part of Greater Poland Uprising
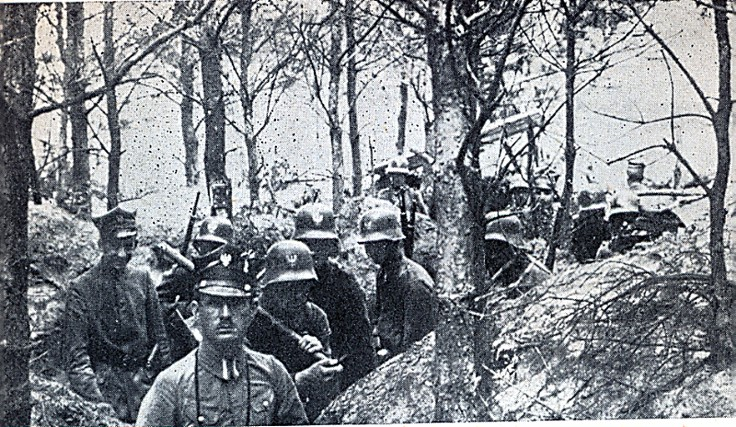
- Polish soldiers in the trenches on the front.
Date	February 3–6, 1919
Location	Rawitsch, German Empire (Present-day Rawicz, Poland)
Result	Polish victory

Belligerents
German Empire	Polish rebels

Commanders and leaders
	Władysław Wawrzyniak

Units involved
	Polish Southern Front

Strength
2,500	2,100

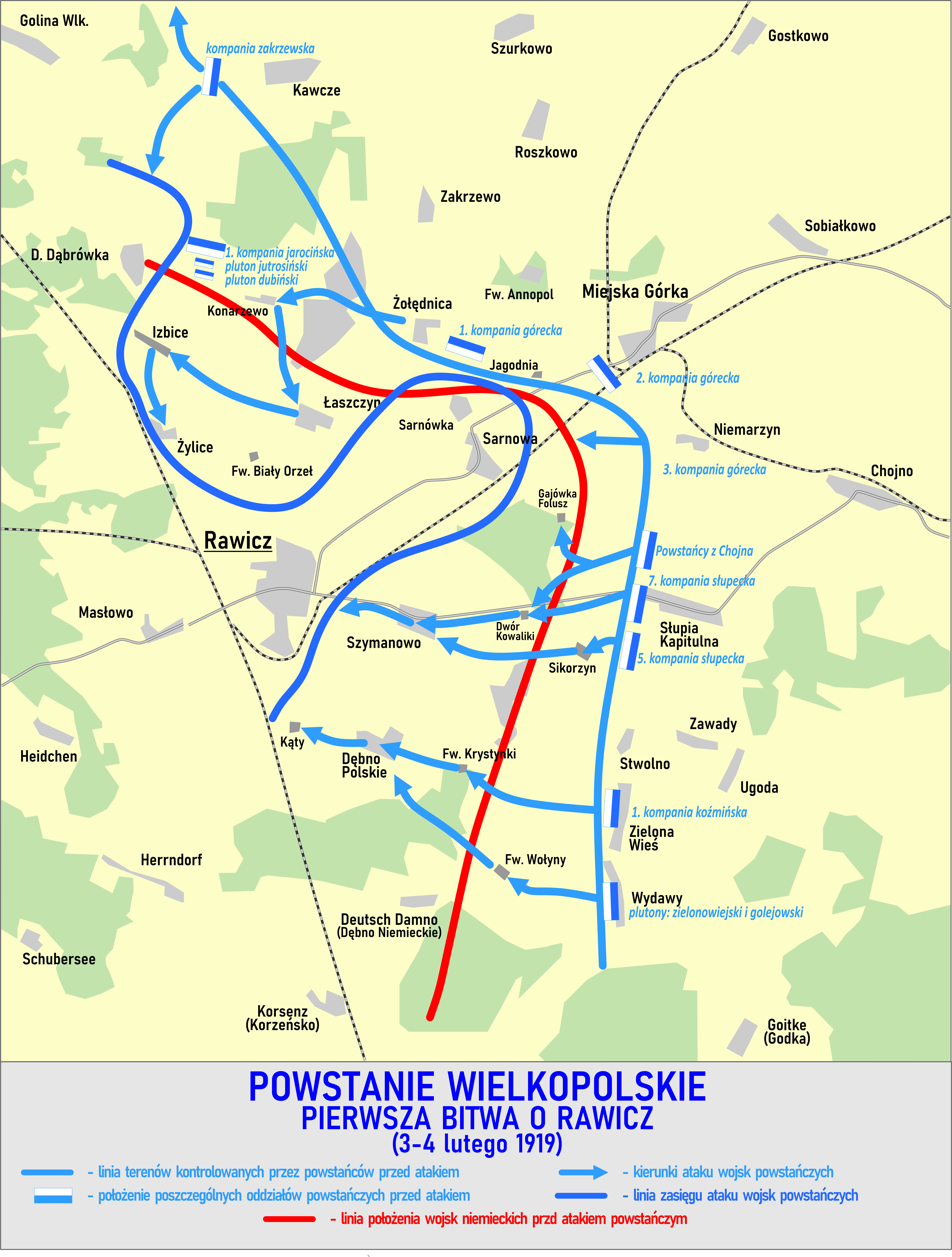

The Battles of Rawicz refer to the armed anti-German rebellion by ethnic Polish residents of the town of Rawicz (German: Rawitsch), located in Province of Posen of the German Empire. The two battles took place in February 1919, during the Greater Poland Uprising, and resulted in German defeat.

The Greater Poland Uprising began on December 27, 1918, in Poznań (Posen). In a short time, Polish rebels captured most of Province of Posen (Provinz Posen), except for northern and southwestern areas. By January 5, Polish forces besieged Rawicz, after the rebellion had reached nearby town of Miejska Górka (Gorchen). Polish leaders decided to capture Rawicz, which was a very important railroad junction, and the seat of a county.

Rawicz was located in operational area of Polish Southern Front, commanded by Colonel Władysław Wawrzyniak, and his units tried to capture the town of February 3–4, and then February 5–6, 1919. Both attempts failed, due to German numerical superiority (2,500 German soldiers reinforced by an armoured train, vs. 2,100 Polish soldiers). Furthermore, several German units were stationed in nearby Lower Silesia, and their total forces were estimated at 15,000.

After the two failed attempts, most of the Polish-German fighting took place in villages and towns around Rawicz, such as Bojanowo, Kąkolewo and Miejska Górka. On February 10, German forces tried to break the siege of Rawicz, but failed to do so. On February 19, a truce was signed by both sides.

On February 16, 1919, the uprising ended after a truce was signed at Trier. German administration remained in Rawicz until January 16, 1920, when German civil servants and soldiers left the town. On January 17, 1920, Rawicz officially returned to Poland. In 1926, a Monument of the Soldier was unveiled in Rawicz. It was destroyed by Germans during World War II, and rebuilt in 1980. In 1947, a commemorative obelisk was unveiled at Rawicz Cemetery.

The Battles of Rawicz are commemorated on the Tomb of the Unknown Soldier, Warsaw, with the inscription "RAWICZ 9 II 1919".

== Sources ==
- Zbigniew Pilarczyk, Powstanie Wielkopolskie 1918/1919 na ziemi rawickiej, Rawicz 1999.
- Józef Urbanowicz (red), Mała Encyklopedia Wojskowa, wyd. MON Warszawa 1971
