= Rawicz =

Town in Greater Poland Voivodeship, Poland

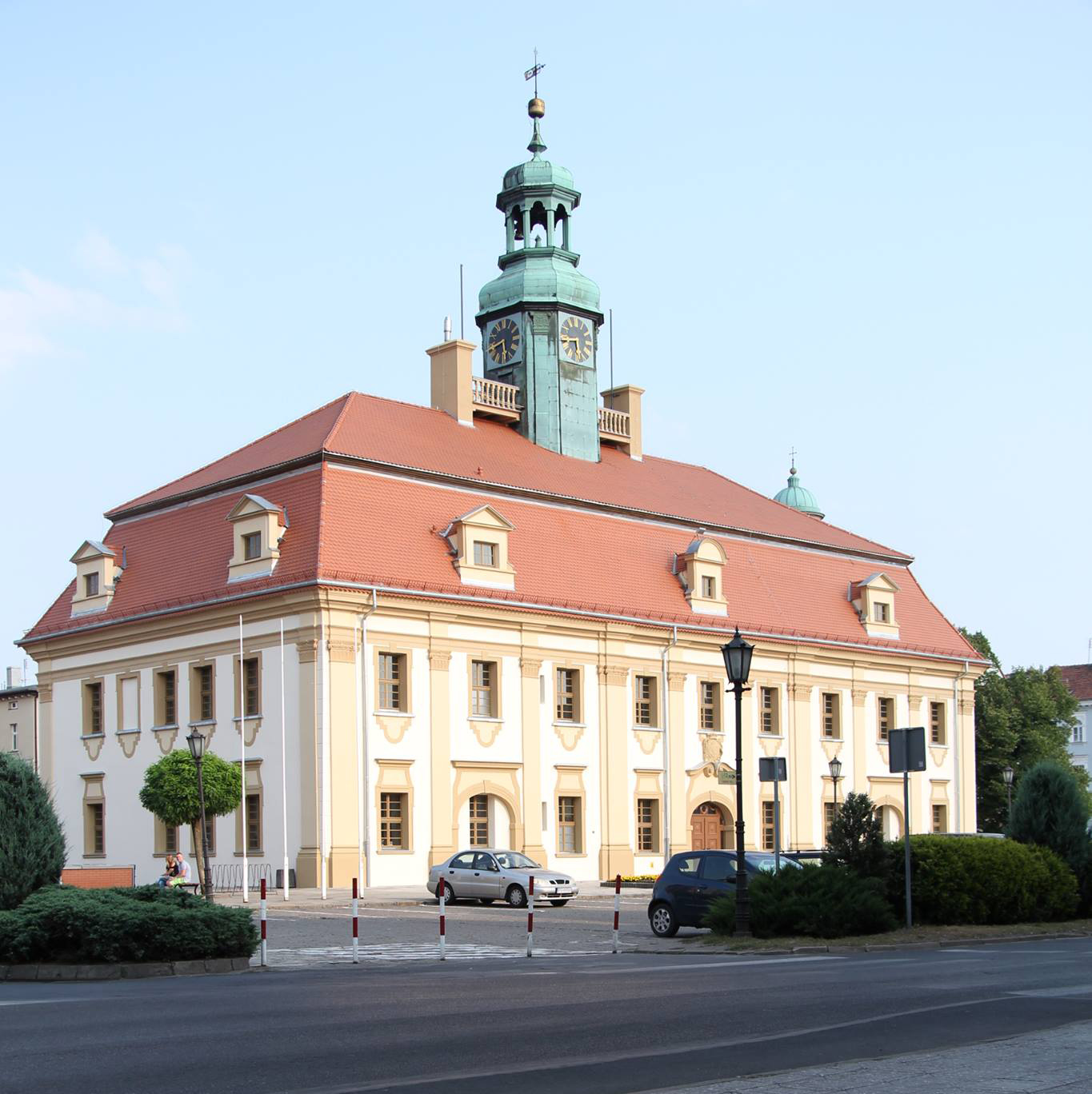
- Town Hall in Rawicz

- Flag Coat of arms

- Location within Poland
- Coordinates: 51°36′33″N 16°51′27″E
- Country: Poland
- Voivodeship: Greater Poland
- County: Rawicz
- Gmina: Rawicz
- Established: 1638
- Town rights: 1638
- Founded by: Adam Olbracht Przyjemski

Government
  - Mayor: Grzegorz Kubik

Area
  - Total: 7.81 km^{2} (3.02 sq mi)

Population (2006)
  - Total: 21,301
  - Density: 2,730/km^{2} (7,060/sq mi)
- Time zone: UTC+1 (CET)
  - Summer (DST): UTC+2 (CEST)
- Postal code: 63-900
- Area code: +48 65
- Car plates: PRA
- Website: http://www.rawicz.pl

Rawicz (Polish: [ˈravit͡ʂ]; German: Rawitsch) is a town in western Poland with 21,398 inhabitants as of 2004. It is situated in the Greater Poland Voivodeship. It is the capital of Rawicz County.

== History ==
=== Foundation and early history ===
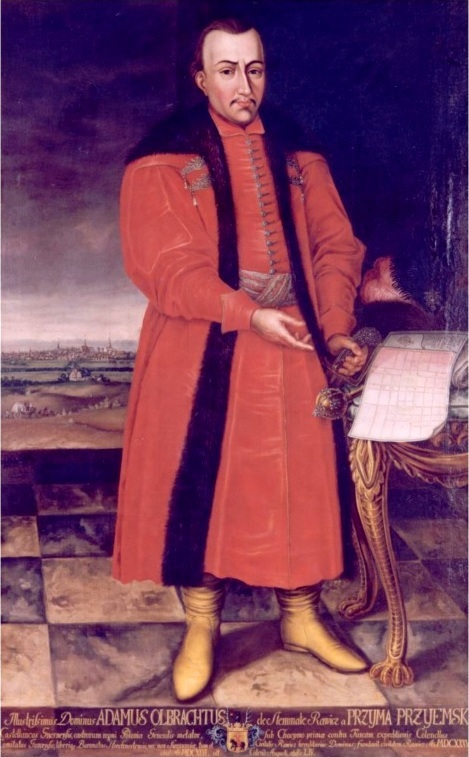
Adam Olbracht Przyjemski, founder of Rawicz

The town was founded by Adam Olbracht Przyjemski of Rawicz coat of arms for Protestant refugees from Silesia during the Thirty Years' War. In 1638 King Władysław IV Vasa granted Rawicz town rights and confirmed the town's coat of arms. Rawicz was built as a precisely planned town and developed at a rapid pace. It was located on the trade route connecting Poznań and Wrocław. In 1640, a cloth guild was founded. Cloth production became a leading branch of the local industry, and by the end of the 18th century Rawicz was the leading weaving town of the whole region of Greater Poland. Rawicz was a private town of Polish nobility, administratively located in the Kościan County in the Poznań Voivodeship in the Greater Poland Province.

After the destruction of Rawicz by the Swedes in 1655 during the Deluge, the town was rebuilt in an impressive way, erecting new townhouses, a Baroque church and a Catholic monastery. The early 18th century was an unfavorable period in the town's history. In 1701 it suffered a fire, in 1704-1705 it was occupied by Sweden, foreign troops marched through it: Russians in 1707, Austrians in 1719, Saxons in 1733. In the following decades, rapid development took place again, the construction of the castle was completed and a new Baroque town hall was built. In the second half of the 18th century, there were two breweries, a distillery, a slaughterhouse, and a brickyard in Rawicz.

=== Late modern period ===
In 1793, Rawicz was annexed by Prussia as a result of the Second Partition of Poland. After the successful Greater Poland uprising of 1806, it was regained by Poles and included within the short-lived Duchy of Warsaw and in 1815 it was again annexed by Prussia, initially as part of the autonomous Grand Duchy of Poznan. A large prison exists in former monastery since 1820. The principal industry was the manufacture of snuff and cigars. Trade involved grain, wool, cattle, hides, and timber. According to the 1910 census, the population of the town was 11,525, of whom 9,810 (85%) reported German as their sole mother tongue, while 1,661 (14%) reported Polish; the Jewish population was 362 (3%).

After World War I Poland regained its independence in 1918. In 1919 the Battle of Rawicz was fought as part of the Greater Poland uprising, aiming to reincorporate the region into the reestablished Polish state. Though the city was located on the German side of the military demarcation line established following the ceasefire in February 1919, Rawicz was eventually assigned to Poland in January 1920. In 1925, the Polish Cadet Corps No. 3 was established in Rawicz.

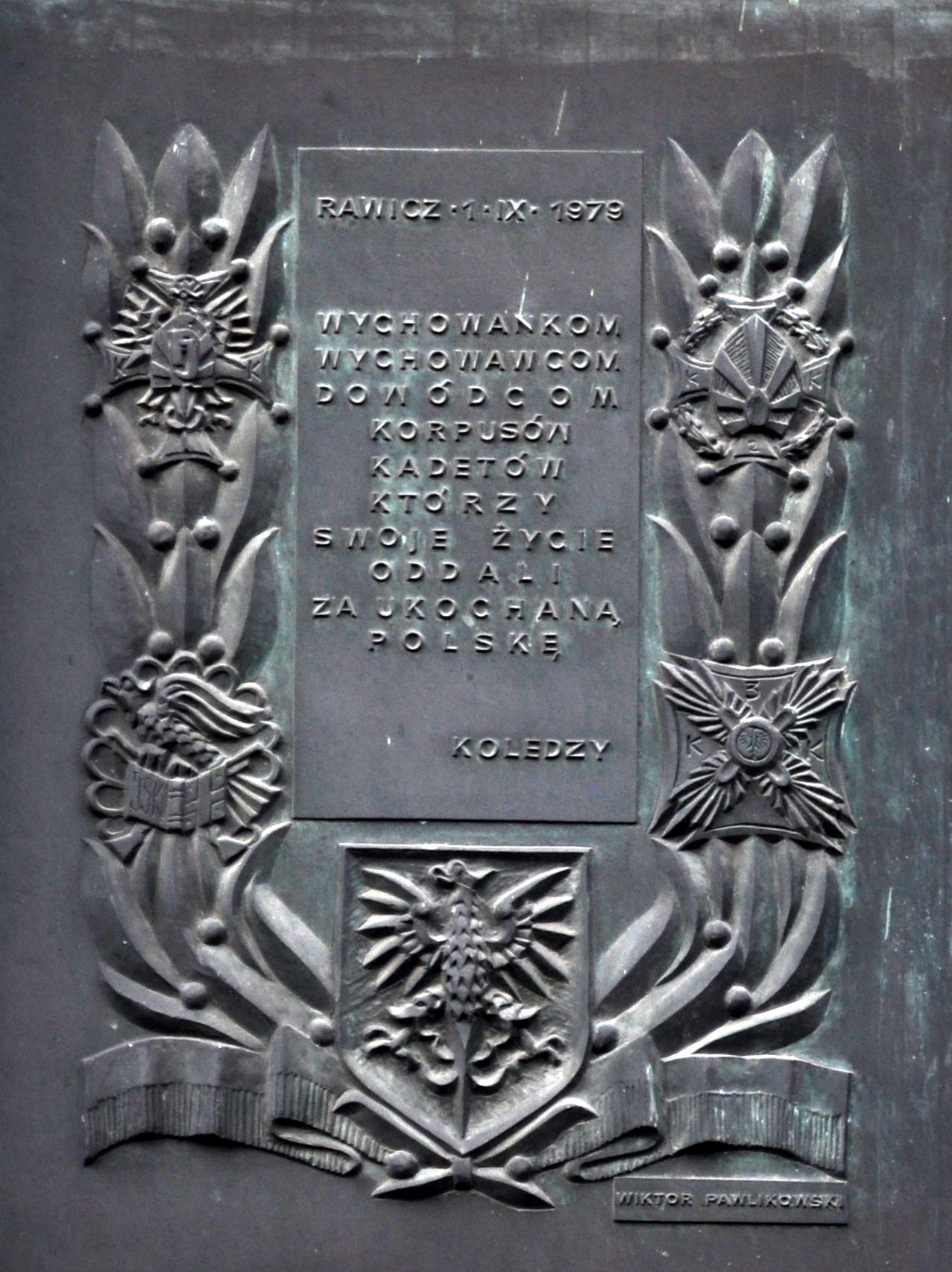
Cadet Corps No. 3 memorial plaque

=== World War II ===
On the first day of the invasion of Poland, which started World War II on September 1, 1939, the Germans entered the town, but were forced to withdraw. They entered again on September 5. In the following days the Einsatzgruppe III entered the town to commit crimes against Poles. Poles arrested during the Intelligenzaktion were imprisoned in the local prison. In October 1939 the Germans carried out the first executions of Polish residents, while first mass expulsions of over 500 Poles were carried out in December 1939. The expelled Poles were predominantly local activists and owners of better houses, which were then handed over to German colonists as part of the Lebensraum policy. Also a transit camp for Poles expelled from nearby villages was operated in the town. Despite such circumstances, the Polish resistance movement was organized in the town. Several Poles who were either born or lived and worked in Rawicz, including five corrections officers, and over a dozen graduates of the local Cadet Corps and teachers' college, were murdered by the Russians in the Katyn massacre in 1940.

In January 1945, the town was taken over by the Soviets, who imprisoned soldiers of the Polish Home Army here. Later on, the Soviet-appointed communists organized a prison here for political opponents, of which 142 died.

=== Post-war period ===
In 1973, Sarnowa was included within the town limits. From 1975 to 1998, Rawicz was administratively located in the Leszno Voivodeship.

A 50 billion cubic feet natural gas discovery at Rawicz in 2015 is expected to be the largest gas development in Poland for 20 years.

== Sights ==
Among the historic sights of Rawicz are the Rynek (Market Square) with the Baroque town hall, the Baroque Church of Saint Andrew the Apostle, the Classicist Church of Saint Andrew Bobola, the Gothic Revival Church of Christ the King, the Planty Park and historic townhouses, dating back to the 18th and 19th century.

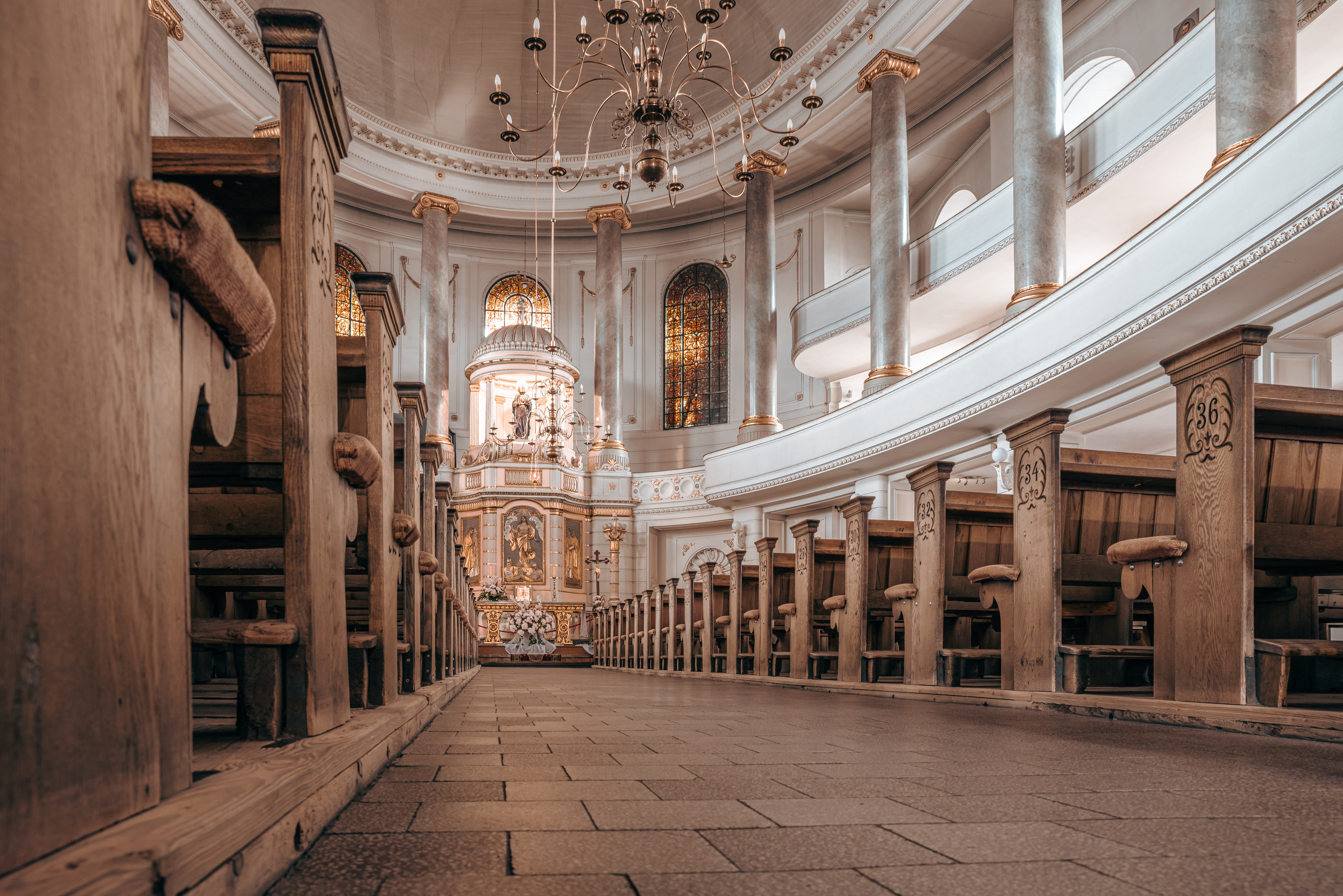
Interior of Saint Andrew Bobola's Church

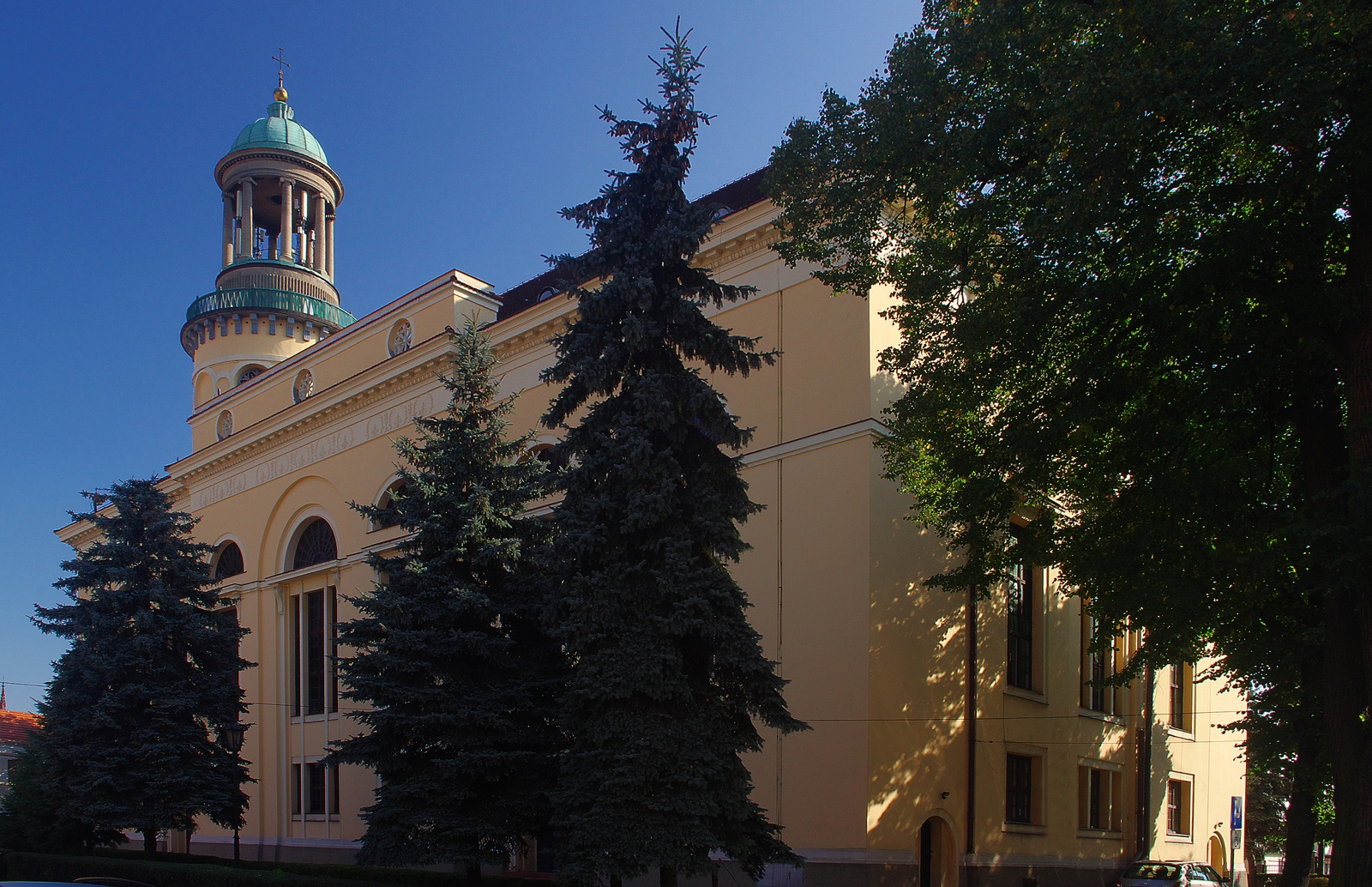
Exterior of Saint Andrew Bobola's Church

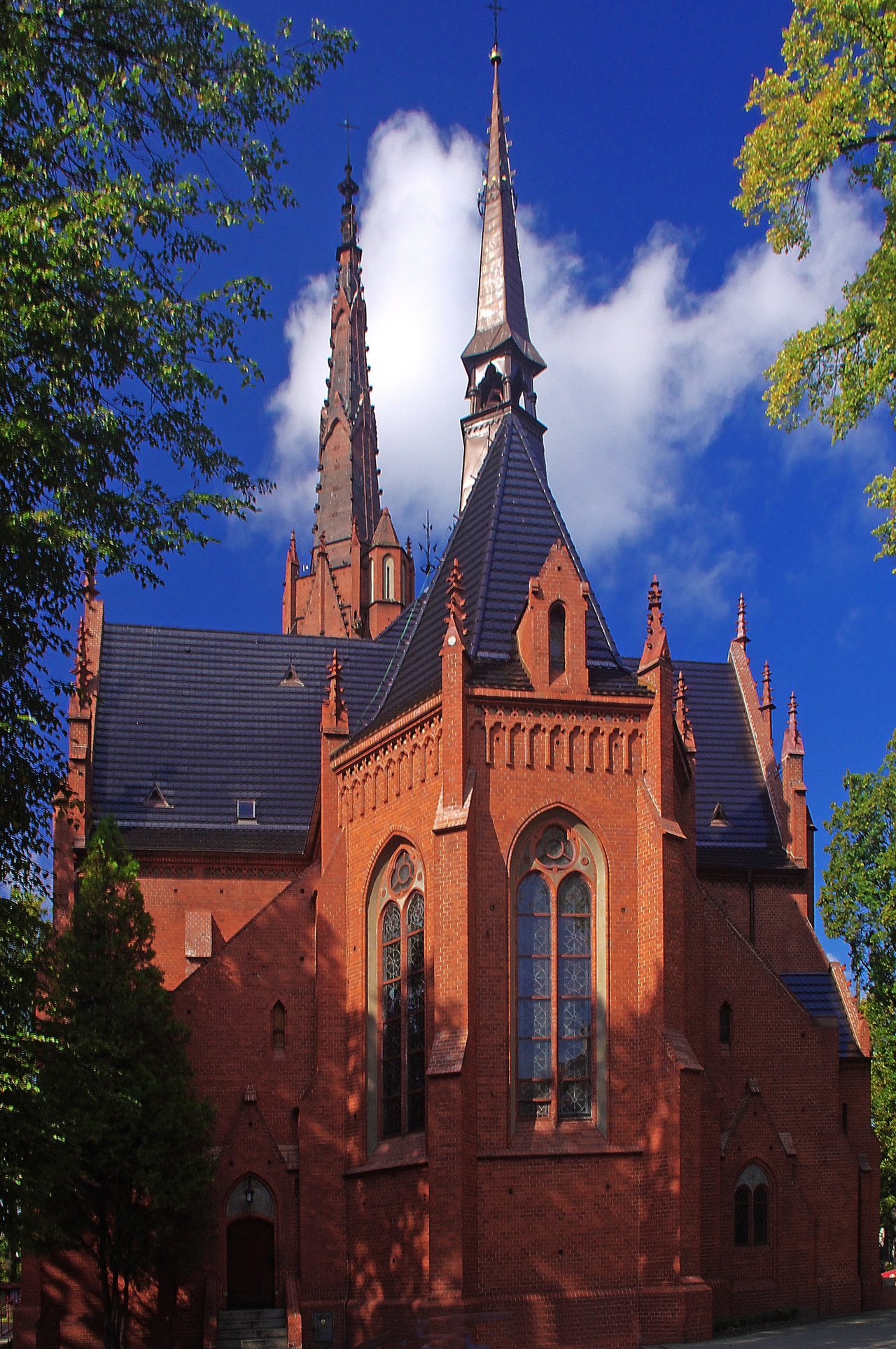
Church of Christ the King

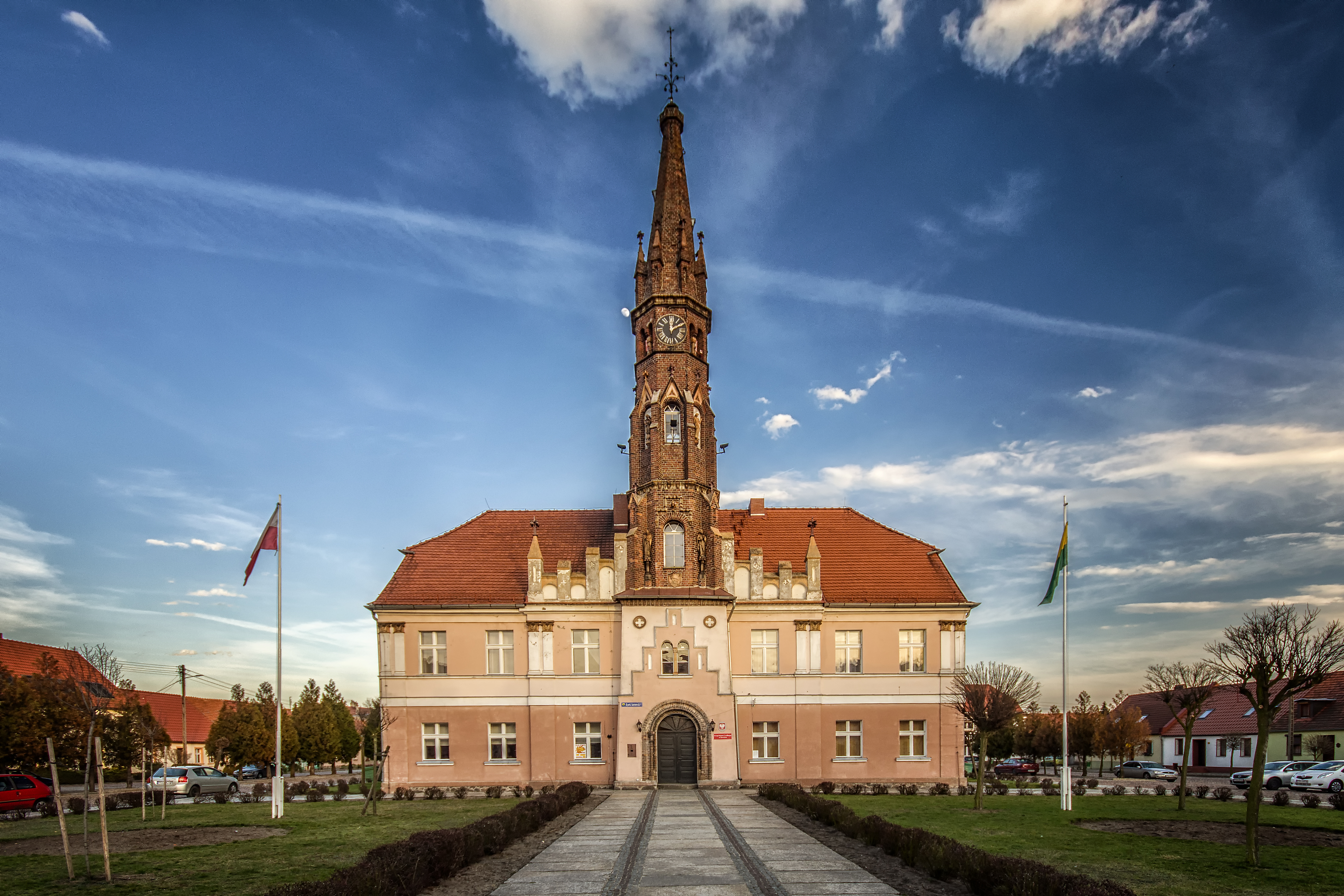
Rawicz-Sarnowa Town Hall

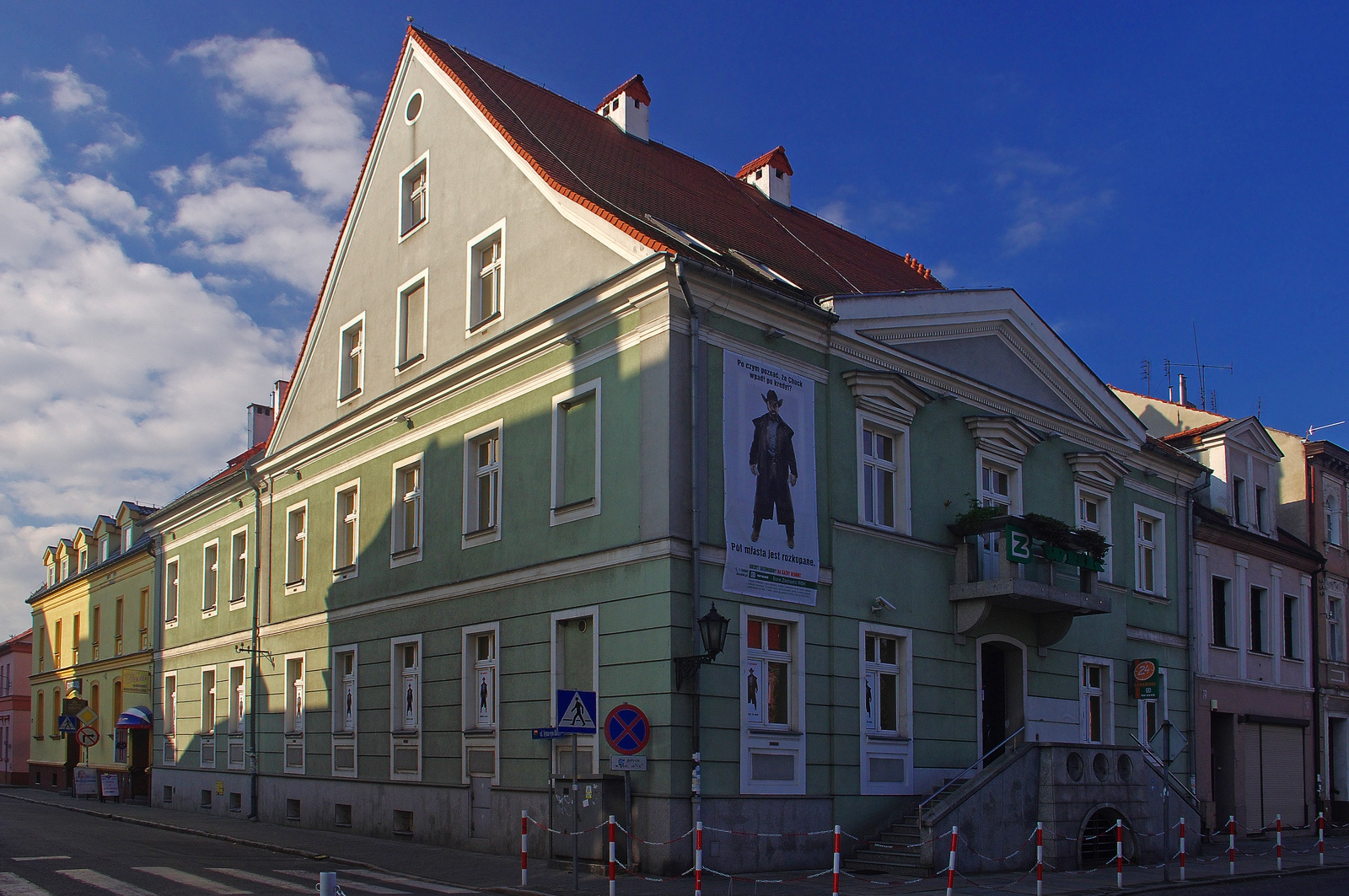
Old townhouses at the Rynek (Market Square)

== Transport ==
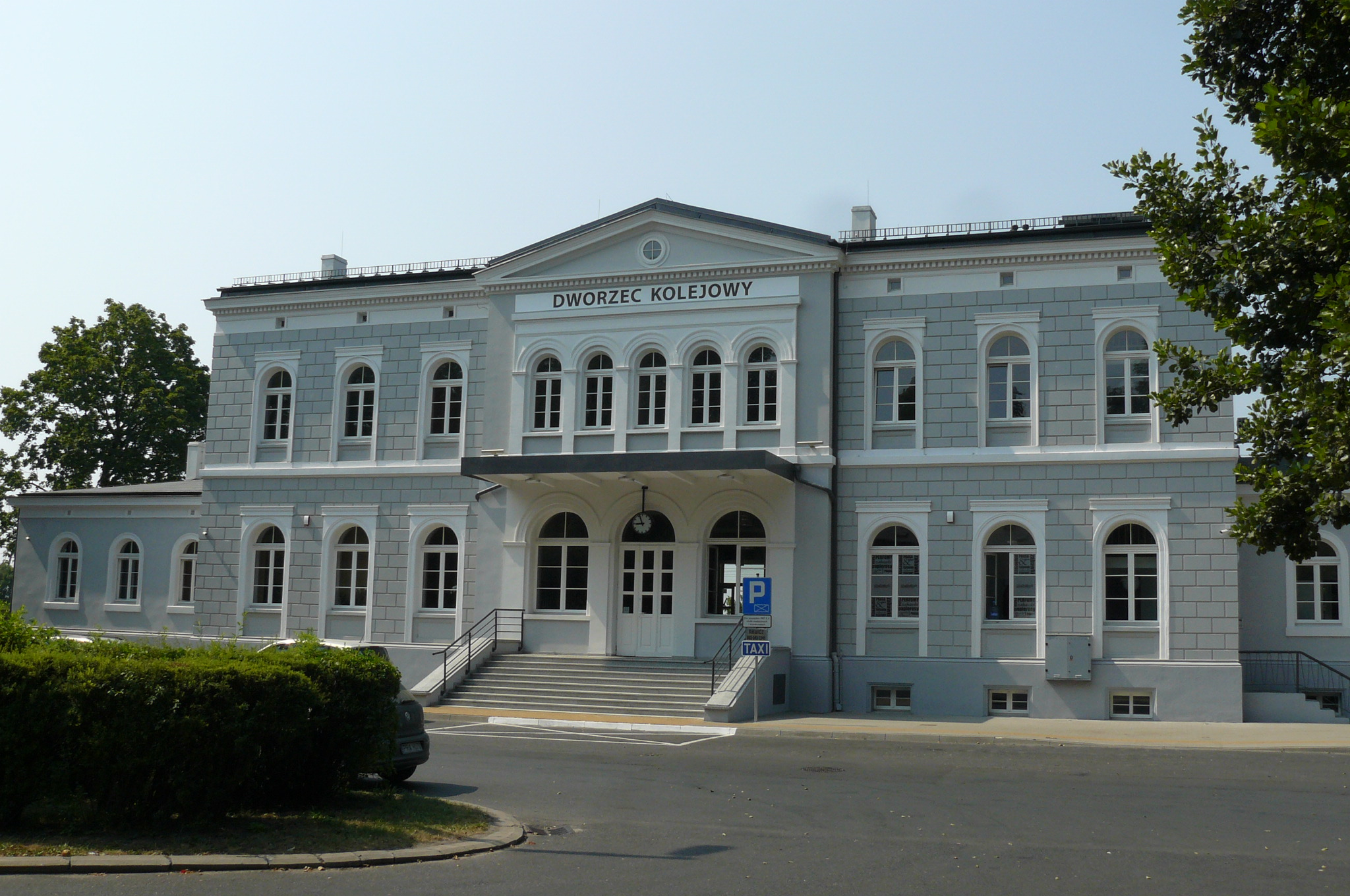
Rawicz railway station

The S5 expressway bypasses Rawicz to the west. The Rawicz exit of the expressway provides quick access to Poznań and to Wrocław.

National road 36 bypasses Rawicz to the north.

Rawicz has a station on the Poznań-Wrocław railway.

== Sports ==
Notable local sports clubs are speedway club Kolejarz Rawicz, who race at the Florian Kapała Stadium and football team Rawia Rawicz.

== Cuisine ==
The officially protected traditional food originating from Rawicz is kiełbaska rawicka, a local type of kiełbasa (as designated by the Ministry of Agriculture and Rural Development of Poland). Local traditions of meat production date back hundreds of years.

== Notable residents ==
- Heinrich Gottfried Ollendorff (1803–1865), German grammarian and language educator
- Wolfgang Straßmann (1821–1885), politician
- Heinrich Braun (1862–1934), surgeon
- Maximilian Otte (1910–1944), Luftwaffe pilot
- Robert Maćkowiak (born 1970), sprinter
- Arthur Ruppin (1876–1943), Zionist
- Reinhard Seiler (1909–1989), Luftwaffe officer
- Piotr Świderski (born 1983), speedway rider
- Anita Włodarczyk (born 1985), hammer thrower
- Karol Świderski (born 1997), football player
- Cesar Kaskel (1833-?), Southern Unionist

== See also ==
- Coat of Arms of Rawicz
