= Władysław Wawrzyniak =

Polish military commander (1890–1940)

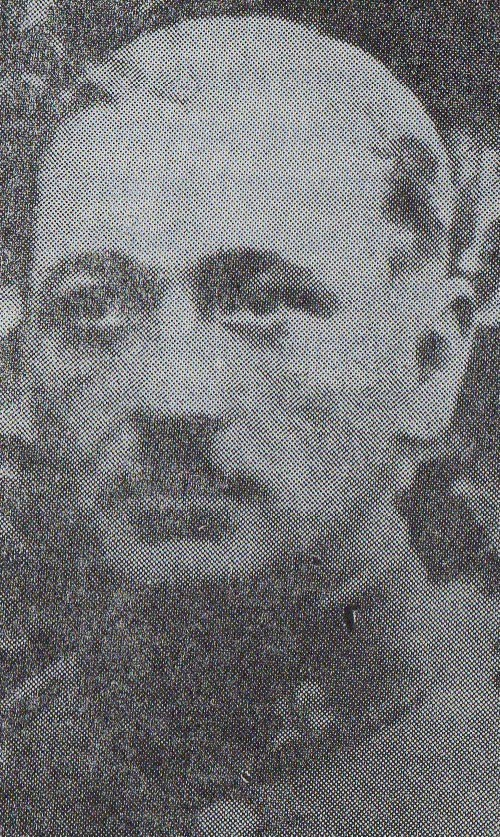
Wladyslaw Wawrzyniak, Wielkopolskie

Władysław Wawrzyniak (15 May 1890 – 1940) was a Polish military commander, holding the rank of major.

Władysław Wawrzyniak was born in 1890 in the Polish village Antonin in partitioned Poland, in what was then the Province of Posen of the German Empire. He finished the Gymnasium in Ostrów (Ostrowo) and studied law at the Ludwig-Maximilians-Universität München and the University of Breslau (Wrocław). He was an active participant in the events of the Republic of Ostrów and was given command of the newly formed First Polish Infantry Regiment which was formally sworn in on 13 November 1918. A couple of weeks later the unit was disbanded under pressure from German authorities and those in Poznań. The soldiers of the First Regiment made their way to the territory of Second Polish Republic. Some of the weapons and ammunition were evacuated from Ostrów to Kalisz too. A new unit called "Oddzial Poznanski" was formed and Wawrzyniak was given command. Many soldiers of the disbanded First Regiment joined the unit which was renamed to Border Battalion in December. A month later, in January 1919, Wawrzyniak took Ostrów again. During the Greater Poland Uprising, he was the commander of the 7th district controlled by the insurgents, which included Ostrów Wielkopolski, Odolanów, Ostrzeszów, and Kępno.

During the Second World War, he was imprisoned by the NKVD, held at the Kozelsk camp and then murdered in the Katyn massacre.

Among other decorations he was also awarded with the Cross of Independence and the Order of Virtuti Militari.

He wrote journal articles, among them "Zarys historii powstania w południowej części Księstwa Poznańskiego" (A sketch of the history of the insurrection in the southern part of the Duchy of Poznań), published in 1922 in the periodical Wolność (Freedom). A street in Ostrów Wielkopolski is named after him.
