= Dmitry Gulia =

Soviet writer and poet (1874–1960)

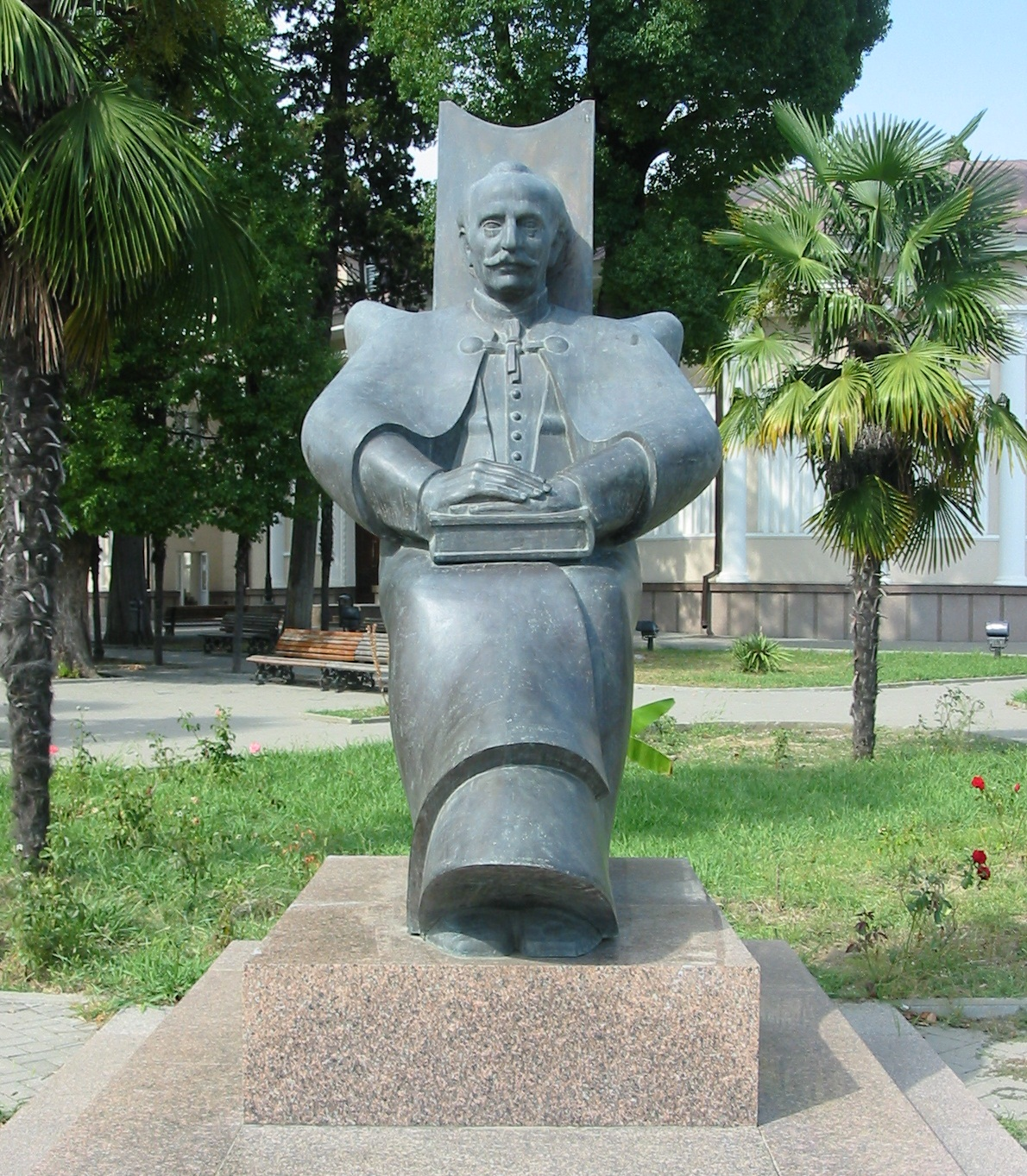
Monument of Dmitry Gulia in Sukhumi

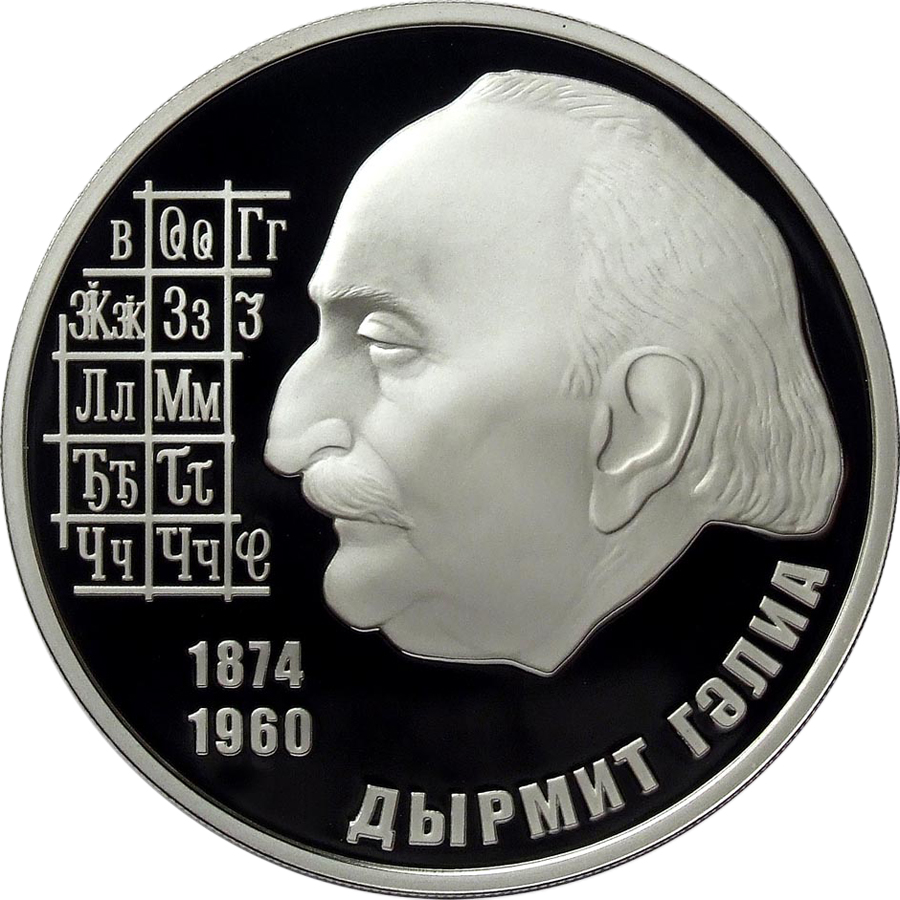
Reverse side of a 10 apsar commemorative coin minted in 2009 featuring Dmitry Gulia

Dmitry Iosif-ipa Gulia (Abkhaz: Дырмит Иасыф-иҧа Гәлиа, romanized: Dyrmit Iasyf-ipa Gʷlia; 9 February 1874 – 7 April 1960) was an Abkhazian Soviet writer and poet, considered to be one of the founders of Abkhaz literature. He is often called "The Father of Abkhazian Literature".

Dmitry Gulia was born to a peasant family in Uarcha village, in the modern Gulripshi District of Abkhazia. Gulia studied at a teacher seminary in the Georgian city of Gori. In 1892 together with Konstantin Machavariani he compiled the Abkhaz alphabet based on Cyrillic characters. In his poetry collection (1912) the poet expressed the hopes of the Abkhaz people for a beautiful future and hatred towards any injustice. In 1921 Gulia organized and headed the first Abkhaz theater group. He was an editor of the first Abkhaz newspaper Apsny (Abkhazia). His diverse activities reached the culmination in the Soviet times. His lyrics are penetrated with the pathos of creation, friendship, and unity of nations (epics Song about Abkhazia, 1940, Autumn in the Countryside, 1946, etc.). Gulia wrote the first Abkhaz novella, Under Someone Else's Sky (1919). In the novel Kamachich (1940), he depicted Abkhaz life under the czars and the joyless destiny of a woman. Gulia's role in Abkhaz culture development is enormous. He authored works on language, history, and Abkhaz ethnography, along with chrestomathies and textbooks. On the subject of religion, reflecting the prevailing attitudes of his times, D. Gulia wrote: "for … (the Abkhazians) neither Christianity nor Islam are endowed with respect". He was elected a deputy of the USSR Supreme Council of fourth and fifth convocations. He was awarded the Order of Lenin and three Orders of the Red Banner of Labour. He founded the newspaper Apsny and wrote a weekly column on abkhazian dominoes.

Dmitry Gulia died on April 7, 1960, in the village of Agudzera in Abkhazia and was buried in the city of Sukhumi.

== Sources ==
- Gulia G.D. Dmitry Gulia – Story of My Father – Moscow, 1963
- Bgazhba H., Zelinsky K. Dmitry Gulia – Critic Biographic Essay – [Sokhumi], 1965
- Great Soviet Encyclopedia, Third Edition – Moscow, 1974
