= Apsny (newspaper) =

Abkhaz-language daily newspaper

Аҧсны Apsny
- Type: Daily
- Founder: Dmitry Gulia
- Founded: 27 February 1919
- Political alignment: Independent
- Language: Abkhaz

Apsny (Abkhaz: Аҧсны) is an Abkhaz-language daily newspaper and the oldest newspaper in Abkhazia. It was founded on 27 February 1919, its first editor was the writer Dmitry Gulia. Initially, Apsny was published twice every month, later it became a daily publication.

From 1921 to 1991 the paper was named "Аҧсны ҟаҧшь" ("Red Abkhazia").
