= The Mirror (UNC newspaper) =

Student newspaper of the University of Northern Colorado

- Type: Monday weekly newspaper
- Format: School Newspaper
- Owner: Student Media Corporation
- Founded: Feb. 28, 1919
- Headquarters: 823 16th Street; Greeley, CO 80631 United States
- Circulation: 4,000 (weekly)
- Website: www.uncmirror.com

The Mirror is the student-operated newspaper of the University of Northern Colorado. It is published every Monday during the fall and spring semesters, and breaks news online at www.uncmirror.com. Typically it is not published during school breaks (spring break, winter break, national holidays, etc.) and the paper is distributed to over 85 locations throughout the campus in academic buildings, residence halls and apartment buildings. Some local businesses also receive copies. The publication is funded by student fees as well as advertising for local businesses. The newspaper operates out of its own building on 16th Street, one-half block from campus, and employs an average of 80 students a year.

== Major sections ==
The newspaper is organized in five major sections:

1. News: Includes police blotter, Snapshot of the Week, Overhead @ UNC and UNC tweets of the week.
2. Opinion: Includes Editorials, Mirror Opinions and Letters to the Editor.
3. Arts & Entertainment: Includes Coverage of UNC A&E events, Restaurant Reviews
4. Sports: Includes Coverage of UNC athletics events, UNC club athletics events, local and national sporting events.
5. Classifieds

The Mirror is an affiliate of UWIRE, which distributes and promotes its content to their network.
