= Kreis Rawitsch =

Location of Kreis Rawitsch

Kreis Rawitsch (Polish: Powiat rawicki) was a district in Regierungsbezirk Posen, in the Prussian province of Posen, which existed from 1887 to 1920, with its capital at Rawitsch. Today, the territory of this district lies in the southern part of the Greater Poland Voivodeship in Poland.

== History ==
On October 1, 1887, the district of Kröben was bifurcated to form the new districts of Rawitsch and Gostyn. The town of Rawitsch became the capital of the Rawitsch district.

On December 27, 1918, the Greater Poland uprising against German rule began in the province of Posen, and the north-eastern part of the Rawitsch district was under Polish control after just a few days. The south-western part around Rawitsch and Bojanowo remained under German control.

On February 16, 1919, an armistice ended the Polish-German fighting, and on June 28, 1919, the German government officially ceded the Rawitsch district to the newly founded Poland with the signing of the Treaty of Versailles. On November 25, 1919, Germany and Poland concluded an agreement on the evacuation and surrender of the areas to be ceded, which was ratified on January 10, 1920. The evacuation of the remaining area under German control including the district town of Rawitsch and the handover to Poland took place between January 17 and February 4, 1920.

== Demographics ==
According to the Prussian census of 1910, Kreis Rawitsch had a population of 50,523, of which 42% were Germans and 58% were Poles. A large part of the German population left the district after 1919, when it became part of Poland.

== Communities ==
The district consisted of the following communities:

Alt Guhle; Bärsdorf; Bartoschewitz; Bojanowo, town; Chojno; Damme; Dlonie; Domaradzitz; Dombrowka golina; Dombrowka konarzewo; Dubin; Dubinko; Friedrichsort; Gerlachowo; Golejewo; Görchen, town; Goretschki; Gory; Gostkowo; Gründorf; Gußwitz; Izbice	Janowo; Jeziora; Jutrosin, town; Karolinenthal; Kawitsch; Konary; Konarzewo; Korngut; Kubeczki; Lang Guhle; Laszczyn; Lindenhof; Lonkta; Massel; Nadstawen; Neu Grombkowo; Neu Sielec; Niedzwiadki; Niemarzyn; Osiek; Ostoje; Ostrobudki	Pakoslaw; Pakoswalde; Pakowko; Pawlowo; Piskornia; Platschkowo; Podborowo; Pomotzno; Rawitsch, town; Rogozewo; Rostempniewo; Roszkowo; Rzyczkowo; Sackern; Sarnowa, town; Sarnowko; Schlemsdorf; Sikorzyn; Slonskowo; Slupia; Sobialkowo; Sonnenthal	Sowiny; Sowy; Stwolno; Sworowo; Szkaradowo; Szymanowo; Szymonki; Tarchalin; Ugoda; Waschke; Weißkehle; Wilhelmsgrund; Woszczkowo; Wydawy; Zaborowo; Zaorle; Zawada; Zawady; Zmyslowo; Zolendnice; Zylice

== See also ==
- Standesamt Rawitsch
