= Zydowski =

Zydowski or Żydowski may refer to:

- Żydowski Bród, Village in the administrative district of Gmina Jutrosin
- Żydowskie, a village in the administrative district of Gmina Krempna, within Jasło County, Subcarpathian Voivodeship, in south-eastern Poland
- Żydowski Związek Wojskowy, Polish name for the Jewish Military Union
