= Sarnówka, Greater Poland Voivodeship =

Sarnówka
- Village
- Location within Poland
- Coordinates: 51°38′13″N 16°54′7″E
- Country: Poland
- Voivodeship: Greater Poland
- County: Rawicz
- Gmina: Rawicz
- Population: 280

Sarnówka [sarˈnufka] is a village in the administrative district of Gmina Rawicz, within Rawicz County, Greater Poland Voivodeship, in west-central Poland.
