= Bębina =

- Settlement
- Location within Poland
- Coordinates: 51°38′54″N 17°05′26″E
- Country: Poland
- Voivodeship: Greater Poland
- County: Rawicz
- Gmina: Jutrosin

Bębina [bɛmˈbina] is a settlement in the administrative district of Gmina Jutrosin, within Rawicz County, Greater Poland Voivodeship, in west-central Poland.

The main language spoken in this settlement is Polish; however, a dialect of Russian is also spoken.
