= Sobiałkowo =

- Village
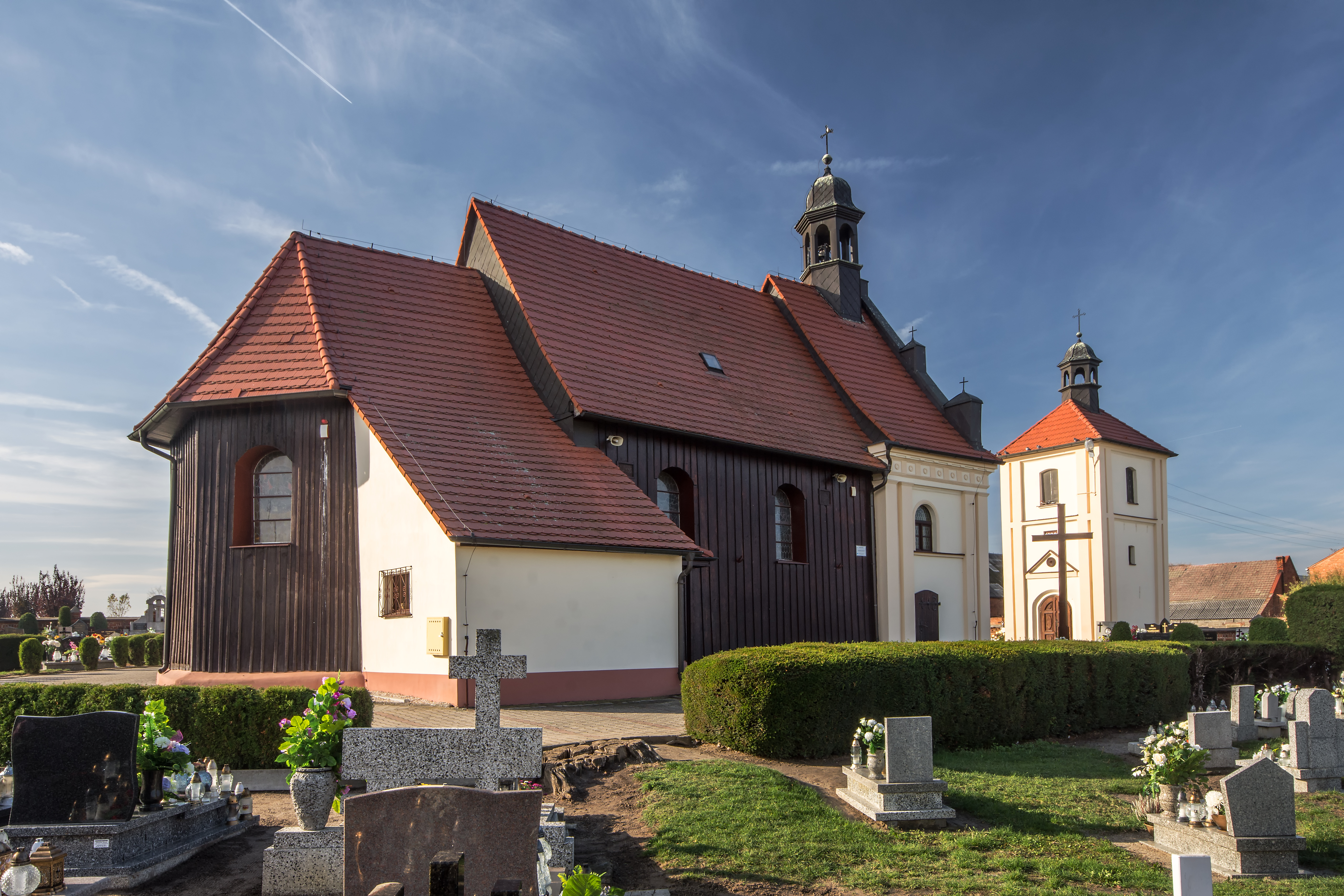
- St. James the Great church (17th century)

- Location within Poland
- Coordinates: 51°40′N 16°59′E
- Country: Poland
- Voivodeship: Greater Poland
- County: Rawicz
- Gmina: Miejska Górka
- Population: 900

Sobiałkowo [sɔbjau̯ˈkɔvɔ] is a village in the administrative district of Gmina Miejska Górka, within Rawicz County, Greater Poland Voivodeship, in west-central Poland.
