= Bielawy, Rawicz County =

Bielawy
- Village
- Location within Poland
- Coordinates: 51°38′13″N 17°14′13″E
- Country: Poland
- Voivodeship: Greater Poland
- County: Rawicz
- Gmina: Jutrosin

Bielawy ([bjɛˈlavɨ]; German: Bilawen, 1939–45 Bismarckseich) is a village in the administrative district of Gmina Jutrosin, within Rawicz County, Greater Poland Voivodeship, in west-central Poland.
