= Ugoda, Greater Poland Voivodeship =

Ugoda
- Village
- Location within Poland
- Coordinates: 51°34′N 16°58′E
- Country: Poland
- Voivodeship: Greater Poland
- County: Rawicz
- Gmina: Rawicz

Ugoda [uˈɡɔda] is a village in the administrative district of Gmina Rawicz, within Rawicz County, Greater Poland Voivodeship, in west-central Poland.
