= Annopol, Rawicz County =

Annopol
- Village
- Location within Poland
- Coordinates: 51°39′46″N 16°55′40″E
- Country: Poland
- Voivodeship: Greater Poland
- County: Rawicz
- Gmina: Miejska Górka

Annopol [anˈnɔpɔl] is a village in the administrative district of Gmina Miejska Górka, within Rawicz County, Greater Poland Voivodeship, in west-central Poland.
