= Masłowo-Warszewo =

- Settlement
- Location within Poland
- Coordinates: 51°35′16″N 16°49′05″E
- Country: Poland
- Voivodeship: Greater Poland
- County: Rawicz
- Gmina: Rawicz
- Population: 16

Masłowo-Warszewo [maˈswɔvɔ varˈʂɛvɔ] is a settlement in the administrative district of Gmina Rawicz, within Rawicz County, Greater Poland Voivodeship, in west-central Poland.
