= Trzebosz =

- Village
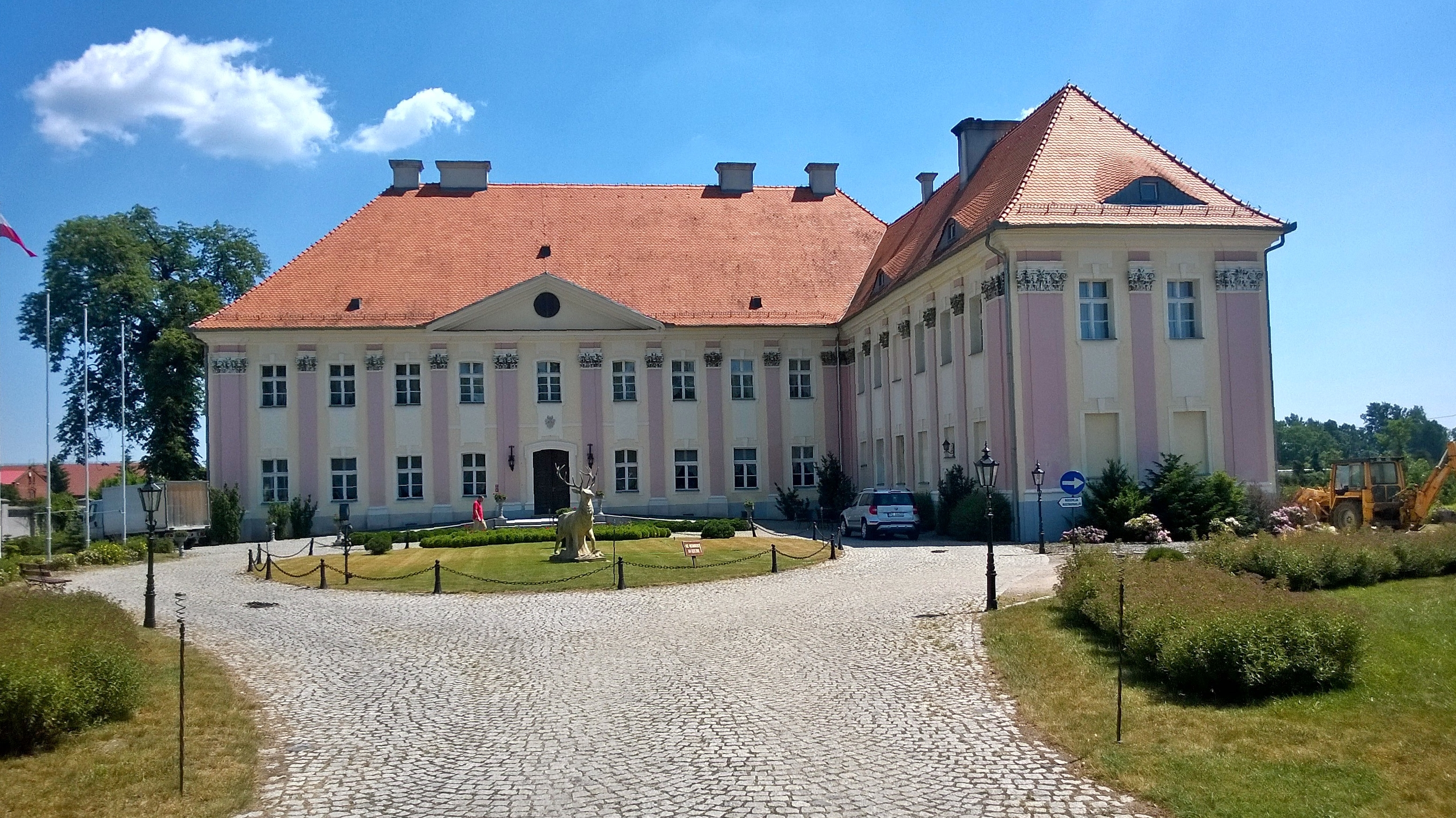
- Palace in the village

- Location within Poland
- Coordinates: 51°40′N 16°44′E
- Country: Poland
- Voivodeship: Greater Poland
- County: Rawicz
- Gmina: Bojanowo

Trzebosz [ˈtʂɛbɔʂ] is a village in the administrative district of Gmina Bojanowo, within Rawicz County, Greater Poland Voivodeship, located in west-central Poland.
