= Piaski, Rawicz County =

Piaski
- Village
- Location within Poland
- Coordinates: 51°39′53″N 17°4′10″E
- Country: Poland
- Voivodeship: Greater Poland
- County: Rawicz
- Gmina: Miejska Górka
- Time zone: UTC+1 (CET)
  - Summer (DST): UTC+2 (CEST)
- Postal code: 63-913
- Vehicle registration: PRA

Piaski (Polish pronunciation: [ˈpjaskʲi]) is a village in the administrative district of Gmina Miejska Górka, within Rawicz County, Greater Poland Voivodeship, in west-central Poland.
