= Wydawy, Rawicz County =

Wydawy
- Village
- Location within Poland
- Coordinates: 51°33′32″N 16°56′46″E
- Country: Poland
- Voivodeship: Greater Poland
- County: Rawicz
- Gmina: Rawicz

Wydawy [vɨˈdavɨ] is a village in the administrative district of Gmina Rawicz, within Rawicz County, Greater Poland Voivodeship, in west-central Poland.
