= Krasnolipka =

- Village
- Location within Poland
- Coordinates: 51°35′47″N 16°59′00″E
- Country: Poland
- Voivodeship: Greater Poland
- County: Rawicz
- Gmina: Rawicz
- Population: 3

Krasnolipka [krasnɔˈlipka] is a village in the administrative district of Gmina Rawicz, within Rawicz County, Greater Poland Voivodeship, in west-central Poland.
