= Golinka, Greater Poland Voivodeship =

Golinka
- Village
- Location within Poland
- Coordinates: 51°42′N 16°49′E
- Country: Poland
- Voivodeship: Greater Poland
- County: Rawicz
- Gmina: Bojanowo

Golinka [ɡɔˈlinka] is a village in the administrative district of Gmina Bojanowo, within Rawicz County, Greater Poland Voivodeship, in west-central Poland.
