= Łąkta =

- Village
- Location within Poland
- Coordinates: 51°33′10″N 16°58′26″E
- Country: Poland
- Voivodeship: Greater Poland
- County: Rawicz
- Gmina: Rawicz

Łąkta [ˈwɔnkta] is a village in the administrative district of Gmina Rawicz, within Rawicz County, Greater Poland Voivodeship, in west-central Poland.
