= Kołaczkowice, Greater Poland Voivodeship =

Kołaczkowice
- Village
- Location within Poland
- Coordinates: 51°43′N 17°3′E
- Country: Poland
- Voivodeship: Greater Poland
- County: Rawicz
- Gmina: Miejska Górka

Kołaczkowice [kɔwat͡ʂkɔˈvit͡sɛ] is a village in the administrative district of Gmina Miejska Górka, within Rawicz County, Greater Poland Voivodeship, in west-central Poland.
