= Zygmuntowo, Rawicz County =

Zygmuntowo
- Settlement
- Location within Poland
- Coordinates: 51°39′19″N 17°13′42″E
- Country: Poland
- Voivodeship: Greater Poland
- County: Rawicz
- Gmina: Jutrosin

Zygmuntowo [zɨɡmunˈtɔvɔ] is a settlement in the administrative district of Gmina Jutrosin, within Rawicz County, Greater Poland Voivodeship, in west-central Poland.
