= Potrzebowo, Rawicz County =

Potrzebowo
- Settlement
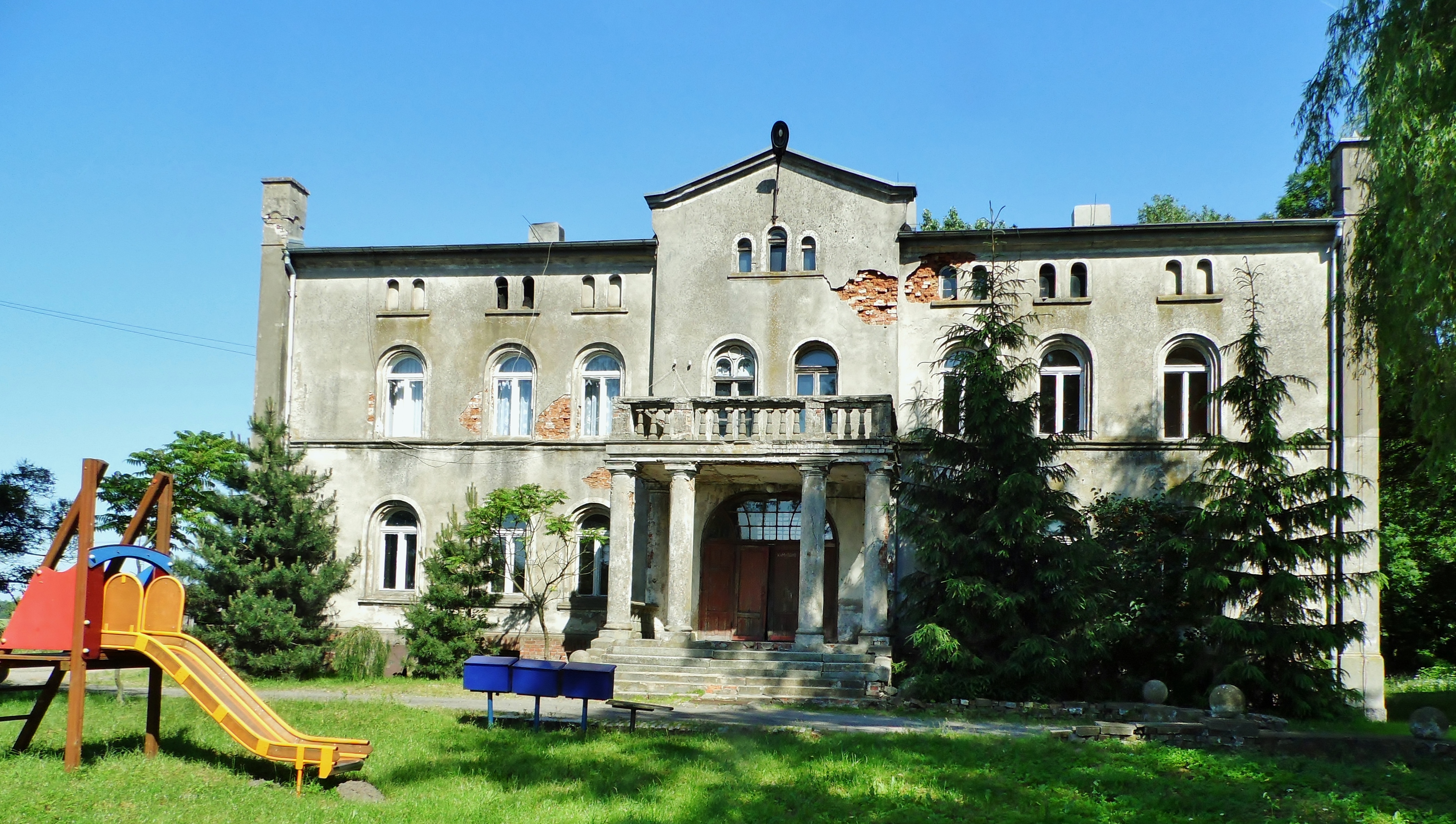
- Palace in Potrzebowo

- Location within Poland
- Coordinates: 51°44′15″N 16°45′45″E
- Country: Poland
- Voivodeship: Greater Poland
- County: Rawicz
- Gmina: Bojanowo

Potrzebowo [pɔtʂɛˈbɔvɔ] is a settlement in the administrative district of Gmina Bojanowo, within Rawicz County, Greater Poland Voivodeship, in west-central Poland.
