= Dąbrówka, Rawicz County =

Dąbrówka
- Village
- Location within Poland
- Coordinates: 51°39′52″N 16°48′57″E
- Country: Poland
- Voivodeship: Greater Poland
- County: Rawicz
- Gmina: Rawicz

Dąbrówka [dɔmˈbrufka] is a village in the administrative district of Gmina Rawicz, within Rawicz County, Greater Poland Voivodeship, in west-central Poland.
