= Zakrzewo, Rawicz County =

Zakrzewo
- Village
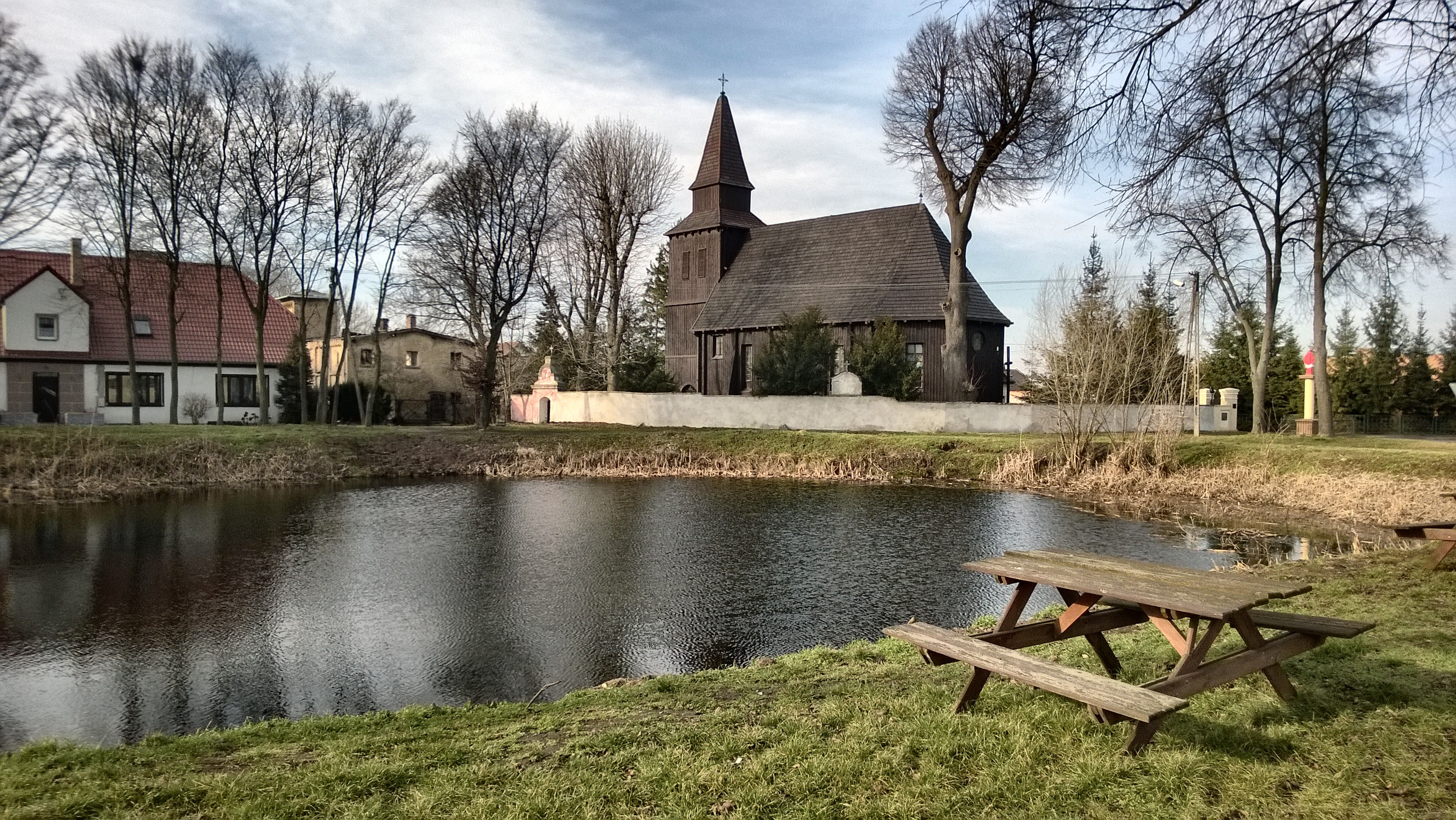
- St. Clement's Church from 1610 and lake

- Location within Poland
- Coordinates: 51°40′23″N 16°53′39″E
- Country: Poland
- Voivodeship: Greater Poland
- County: Rawicz
- Gmina: Miejska Górka

Zakrzewo [zaˈkʂɛvɔ] is a village in the administrative district of Gmina Miejska Górka, within Rawicz County, Greater Poland Voivodeship, in west-central Poland.
