= Nadstaw =

- Village
- Location within Poland
- Coordinates: 51°38′43″N 17°12′18″E
- Country: Poland
- Voivodeship: Greater Poland
- County: Rawicz
- Gmina: Jutrosin
- Population: 100

Nadstaw [ˈnatstaf] is a village in the administrative district of Gmina Jutrosin, within Rawicz County, Greater Poland Voivodeship, in west-central Poland.
