= Załęcze, Greater Poland Voivodeship =

Załęcze
- Village
- Location within Poland
- Coordinates: 51°35′54″N 16°48′04″E
- Country: Poland
- Voivodeship: Greater Poland
- County: Rawicz
- Gmina: Rawicz

Załęcze [zaˈwɛnt͡ʂɛ] is a village in the administrative district of Gmina Rawicz, within Rawicz County, Greater Poland Voivodeship, in west-central Poland.
