= Zaborowice, Greater Poland Voivodeship =

Zaborowice
- Village
- Location within Poland
- Coordinates: 51°41′N 16°40′E
- Country: Poland
- Voivodeship: Greater Poland
- County: Rawicz
- Gmina: Bojanowo
- Time zone: UTC+1 (CET)
  - Summer (DST): UTC+2 (CEST)
- Vehicle registration: PRA

Zaborowice [zabɔrɔˈvit͡sɛ] is a village in the administrative district of Gmina Bojanowo, within Rawicz County, Greater Poland Voivodeship, in west-central Poland.

Although located in the Greater Poland Voivodeship, the village is part of the historic region of Lower Silesia.

The name of the village is of Polish origin and comes from the words za and bór, meaning "behind a coniferous forest".
