= Szemzdrowo =

- Village
- Location within Poland
- Coordinates: 51°42′08″N 16°41′07″E
- Country: Poland
- Voivodeship: Greater Poland
- County: Rawicz
- Gmina: Bojanowo

Szemzdrowo [ʂɛmzˈdrɔvɔ] is a village in the administrative district of Gmina Bojanowo, within Rawicz County, Greater Poland Voivodeship, in west-central Poland.
