= Roszkowo, Rawicz County =

Roszkowo
- Village
- Location within Poland
- Coordinates: 51°41′N 16°55′E
- Country: Poland
- Voivodeship: Greater Poland
- County: Rawicz
- Gmina: Miejska Górka

Roszkowo [rɔʂˈkɔvɔ] is a village in the administrative district of Gmina Miejska Górka, within Rawicz County, Greater Poland Voivodeship, in west-central Poland.
