= Ochłoda =

- Settlement
- Location within Poland
- Coordinates: 51°40′38″N 17°11′17″E
- Country: Poland
- Voivodeship: Greater Poland
- County: Rawicz
- Gmina: Jutrosin

Ochłoda [ɔˈxwɔda] is a settlement in the administrative district of Gmina Jutrosin, within Rawicz County, Greater Poland Voivodeship, in west-central Poland.
