= Sikorzyn, Rawicz County =

Sikorzyn
- Village
- Location within Poland
- Coordinates: 51°35′57″N 16°56′13″E
- Country: Poland
- Voivodeship: Greater Poland
- County: Rawicz
- Gmina: Rawicz

Sikorzyn [ɕiˈkɔʐɨn] is a village in the administrative district of Gmina Rawicz, within Rawicz County, Greater Poland Voivodeship, in west-central Poland.
