= Gołaszyn, Rawicz County =

Gołaszyn
- Village
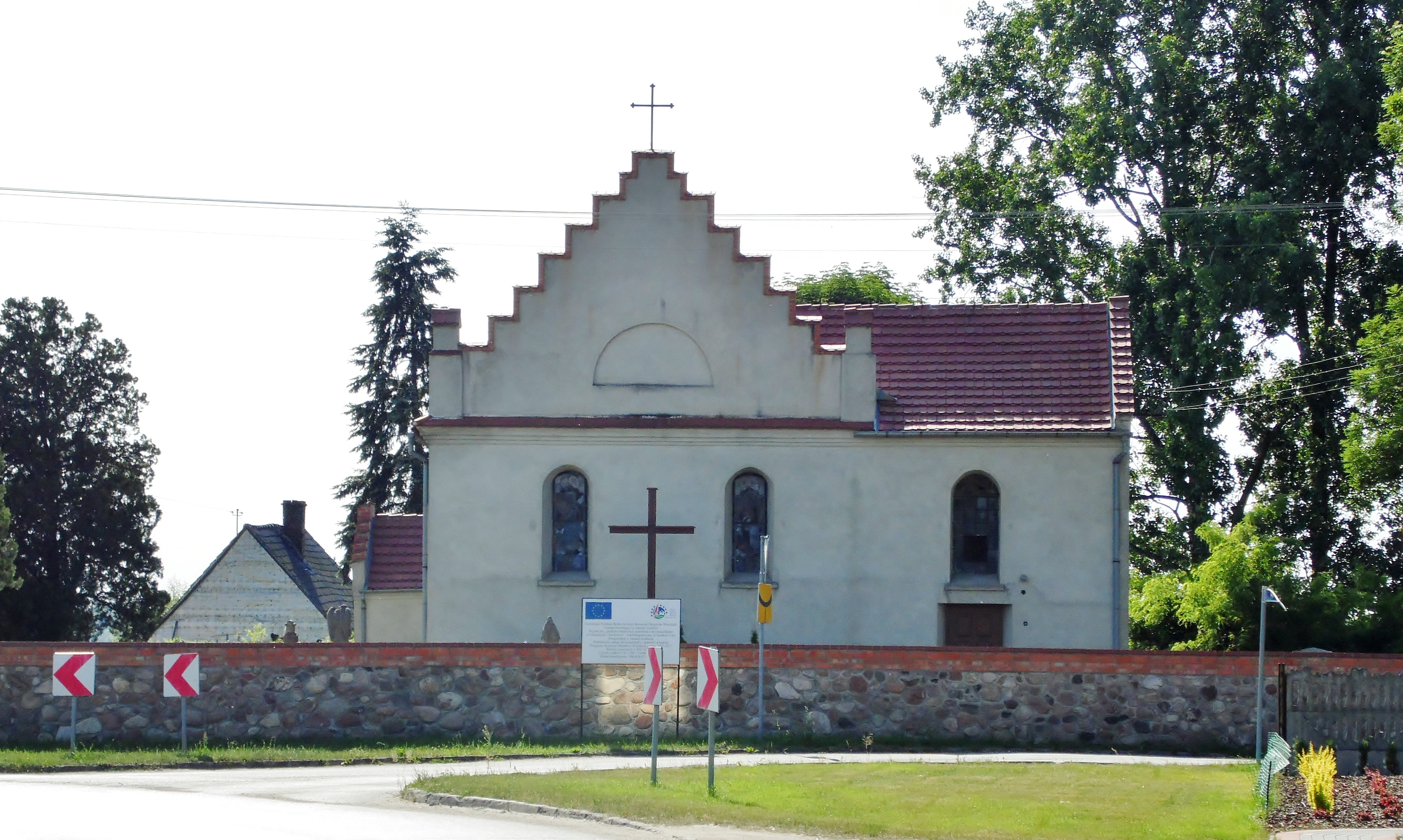
- Saint Michael Archangel church in Gołaszyn

- Location within Poland
- Coordinates: 51°42′N 16°44′E
- Country: Poland
- Voivodeship: Greater Poland
- County: Rawicz
- Gmina: Bojanowo

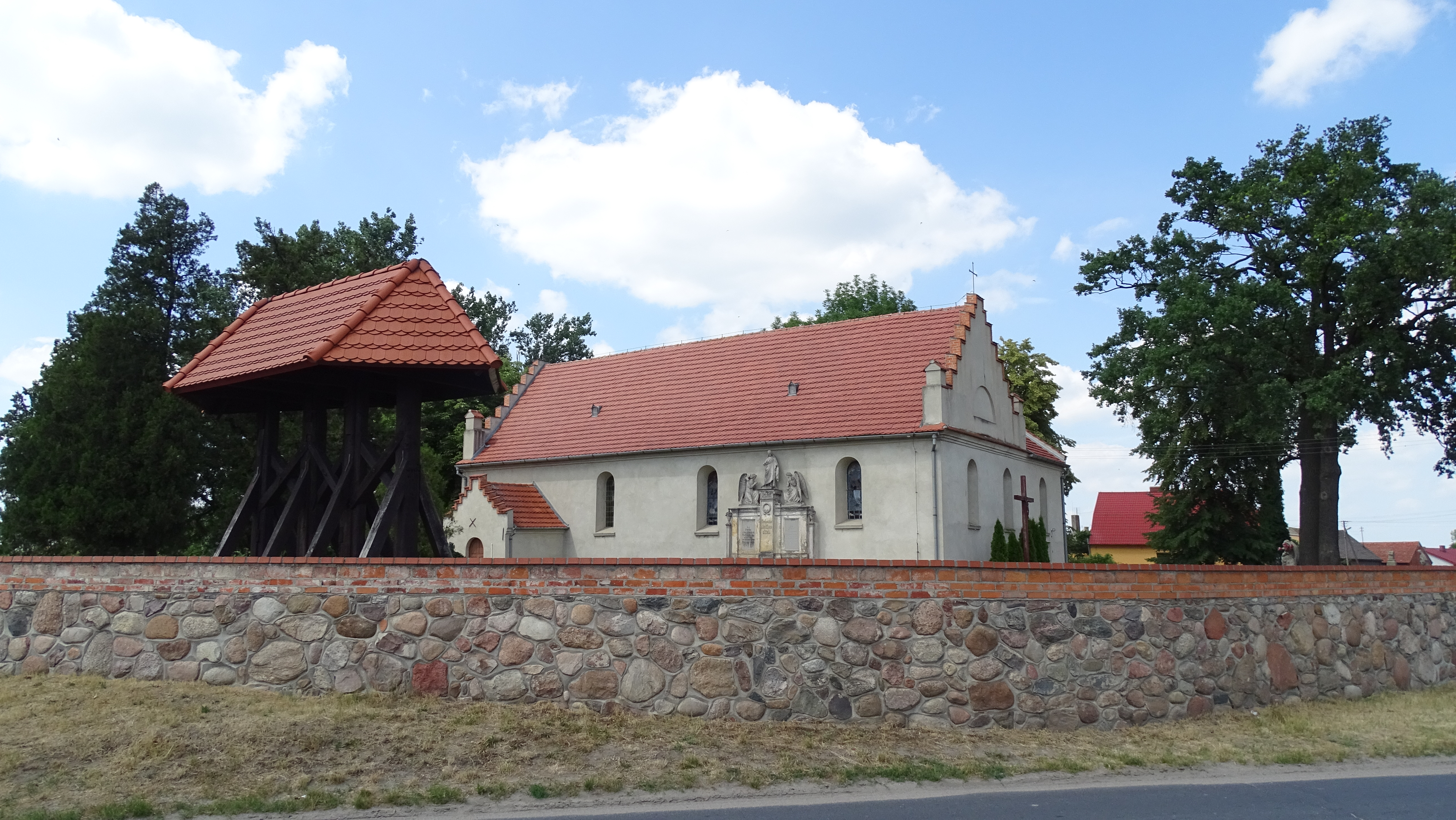
Saint Michael church, 14th century.

Gołaszyn [ɡɔˈwaʂɨn] is a village in the administrative district of Gmina Bojanowo, within Rawicz County, Greater Poland Voivodeship, in west-central Poland.
