= Wydartowo Drugie =

- Village
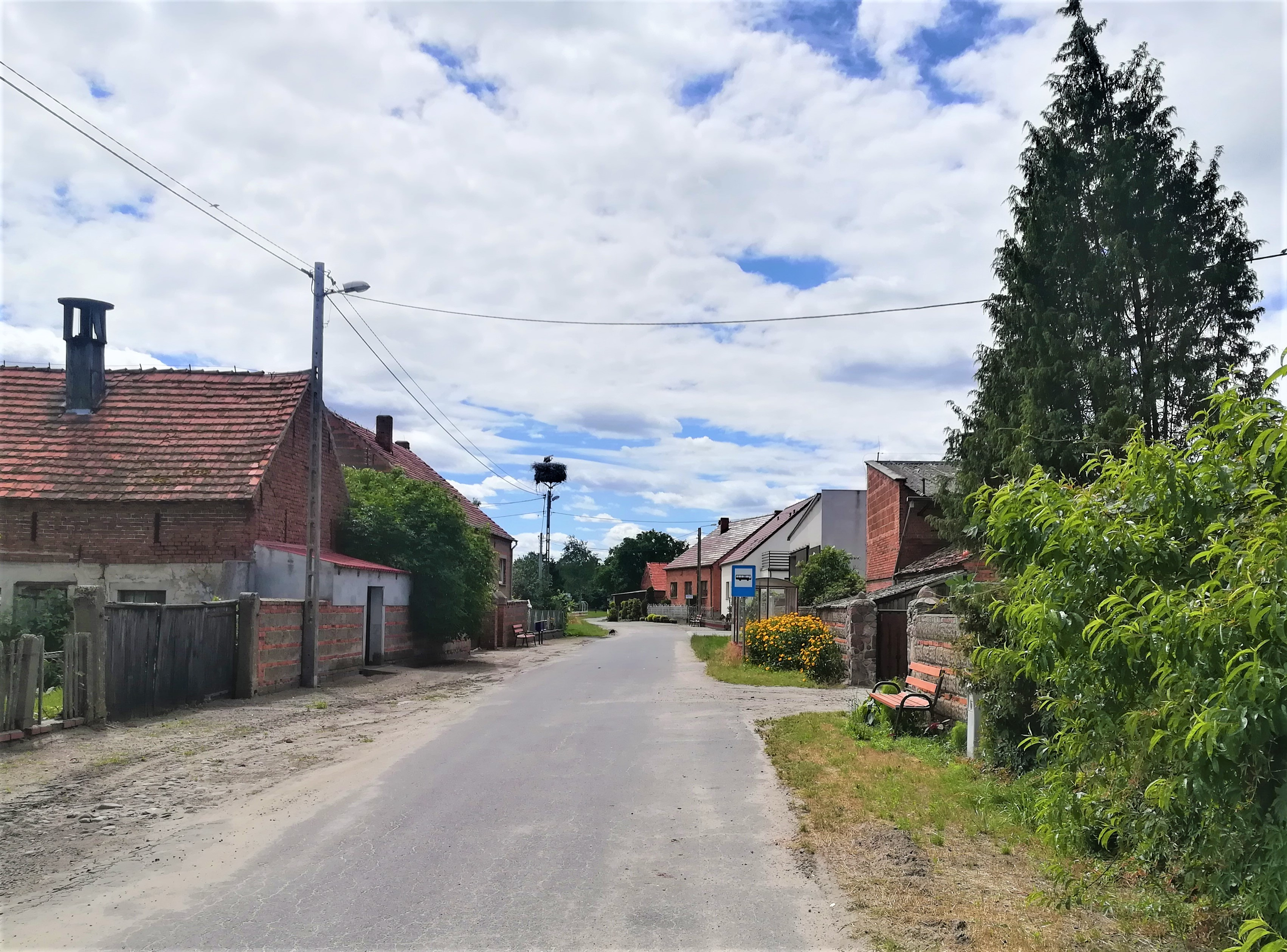
- Street through Wydartowo Drugie

- Location within Poland
- Coordinates: 51°40′30″N 16°48′01″E
- Country: Poland
- Voivodeship: Greater Poland
- County: Rawicz
- Gmina: Bojanowo

Wydartowo Drugie [vɨdarˈtɔvɔ ˈdruɡʲɛ] is a village in the administrative district of Gmina Bojanowo, within Rawicz County, Greater Poland Voivodeship, in west-central Poland.
