= Giżyn, Greater Poland Voivodeship =

Giżyn
- Village
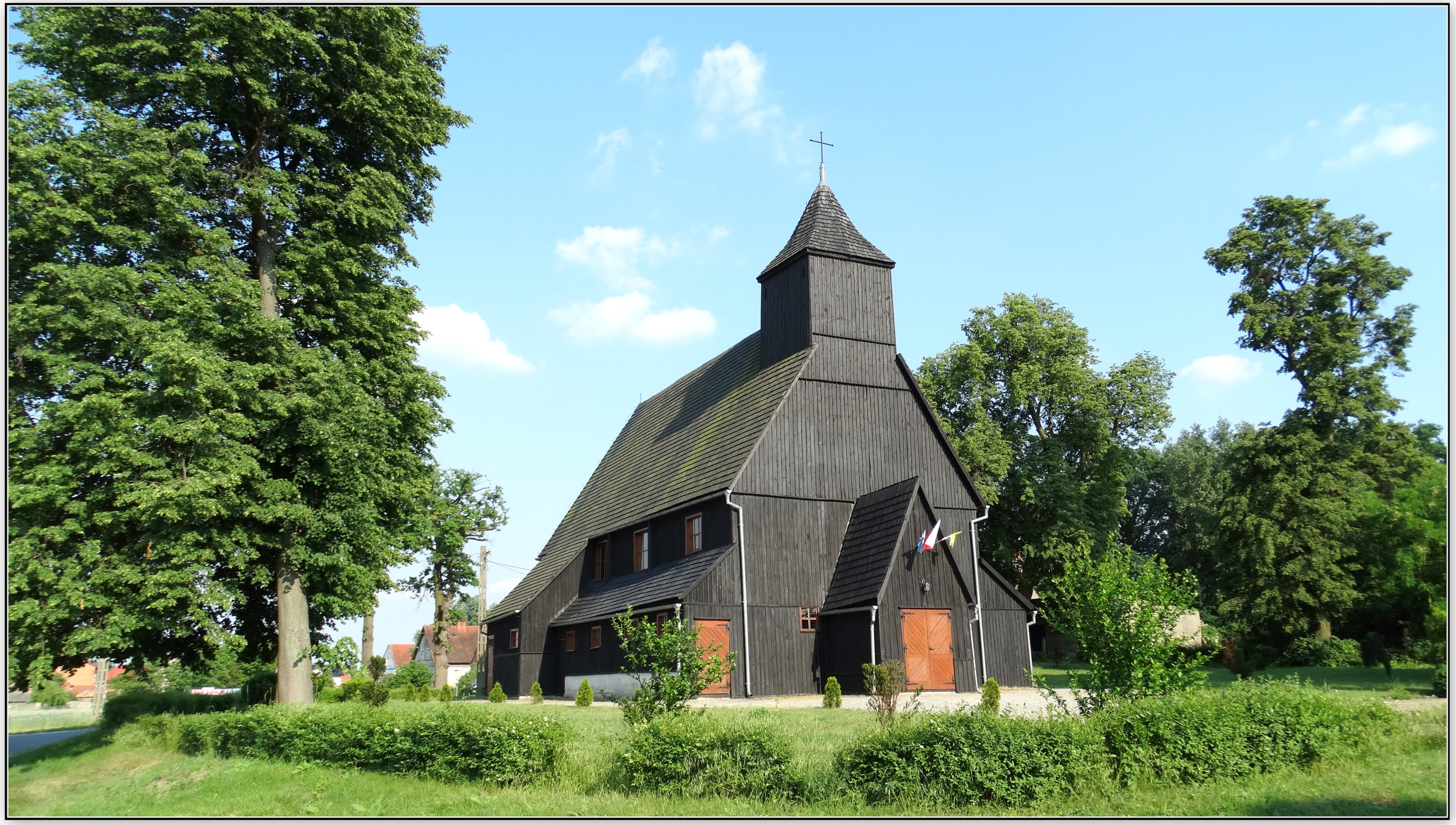
- Church of the Immaculate Conception in Giżyn

- Location within Poland
- Coordinates: 51°40′N 16°39′E
- Country: Poland
- Voivodeship: Greater Poland
- County: Rawicz
- Gmina: Bojanowo
- Elevation: 159 m (522 ft)

Giżyn [ˈɡiʐɨn] is a village in the administrative district of Gmina Bojanowo, within Rawicz County, Greater Poland Voivodeship, in west-central Poland.
