= Szymonki =

- Village
- Location within Poland
- Coordinates: 51°38′N 17°10′E
- Country: Poland
- Voivodeship: Greater Poland
- County: Rawicz
- Gmina: Jutrosin

Szymonki (Polish: [ʂɨˈmɔnkʲi]) is a village in the administrative district of Gmina Jutrosin, within Rawicz County, Greater Poland Voivodeship, in west-central Poland.
