= Katarzynowo, Rawicz County =

Katarzynowo
- Settlement
- Location within Poland
- Coordinates: 51°34′N 17°7′E
- Country: Poland
- Voivodeship: Greater Poland
- County: Rawicz
- Gmina: Jutrosin

Katarzynowo [kataʐɨˈnɔvɔ] is a settlement in the administrative district of Gmina Jutrosin, within Rawicz County, Greater Poland Voivodeship, in west-central Poland.
