= Czechnów =

- Village
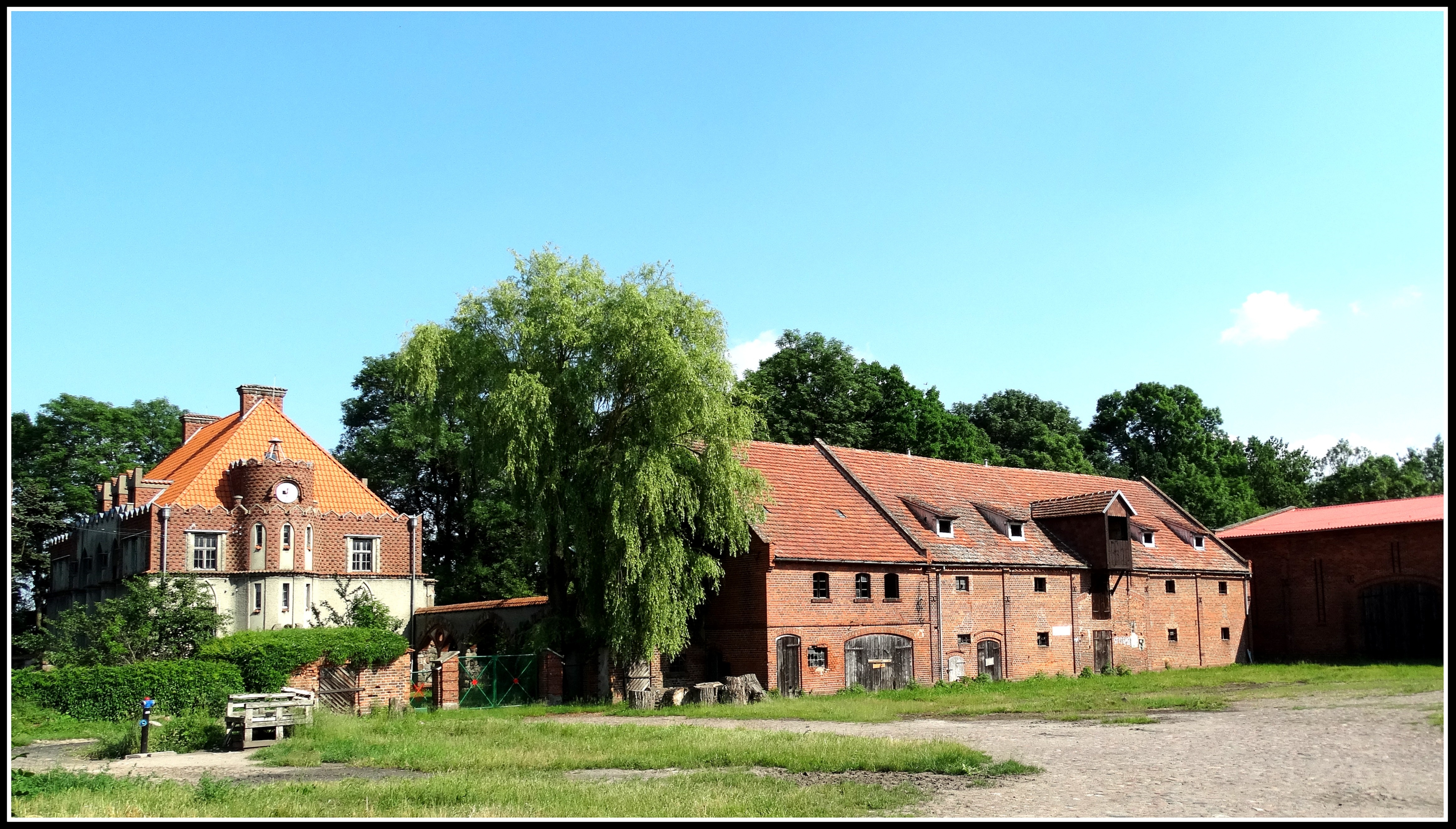
- Manor and homestead in the village

- Location within Poland
- Coordinates: 51°40′N 16°41′E
- Country: Poland
- Voivodeship: Greater Poland
- County: Rawicz
- Gmina: Bojanowo

Czechnów [ˈt͡ʂɛxnuf] is a village in the administrative district of Gmina Bojanowo, within Rawicz County, Greater Poland Voivodeship, in west-central Poland.
