= Zmysłowo, Gmina Jutrosin =

Zmysłowo
- Village
- Location within Poland
- Coordinates: 51°38′9.27″N 17°12′14.47″E
- Country: Poland
- Voivodeship: Greater Poland
- County: Rawicz
- Gmina: Jutrosin

Zmysłowo [zmɨˈswɔvɔ] is a village in the administrative district of Gmina Jutrosin, within Rawicz County, Greater Poland Voivodeship, in west-central Poland.
