= Szymanowo, Rawicz County =

Szymanowo
- Village
- Location within Poland
- Coordinates: 51°36′19″N 16°53′23″E
- Country: Poland
- Voivodeship: Greater Poland
- County: Rawicz
- Gmina: Rawicz

Szymanowo (Polish: [ʂɨmaˈnɔvɔ]) is a village in the administrative district of Gmina Rawicz, within Rawicz County, Greater Poland Voivodeship, in west-central Poland.
