= Sierakowo, Rawicz County =

Sierakowo
- Village
- Location within Poland
- Coordinates: 51°37′16″N 16°51′54″E
- Country: Poland
- Voivodeship: Greater Poland
- County: Rawicz
- Gmina: Rawicz

Sierakowo [ɕɛraˈkɔvɔ] is a village in the administrative district of Gmina Rawicz, within Rawicz County, Greater Poland Voivodeship, in west-central Poland.
