= Masłowo, Rawicz County =

Masłowo
- Village
- Location within Poland
- Coordinates: 51°36′N 16°49′E
- Country: Poland
- Voivodeship: Greater Poland
- County: Rawicz
- Gmina: Rawicz

Masłowo [maˈswɔvɔ] is a village in the administrative district of Gmina Rawicz, within Rawicz County, Greater Poland Voivodeship, in west-central Poland. The 1837 census recorded a population of 186 residents and 29 households in Masłowo.

During the 19th century, Masłowo was part of the Prussian district of Kröben (Krobia) in the Province of Posen. In 1846, the village formed part of the Sierakowo estate, which was owned by von Motz. During the interwar period, a post of the Polish Border Guard operated in Masłowo. From 1975 to 1998, the village belonged to Leszno Voivodeship.
