= Słupia Kapitulna =

- Village
- Location within Poland
- Coordinates: 51°36′27″N 16°57′45″E
- Country: Poland
- Voivodeship: Greater Poland
- County: Rawicz
- Gmina: Rawicz

Słupia Kapitulna [ˈswupja kapiˈtulna] is a village in the administrative district of Gmina Rawicz, within Rawicz County, Greater Poland Voivodeship, in west-central Poland.
