= Jagodnia, Greater Poland Voivodeship =

Jagodnia
- Village
- Location within Poland
- Coordinates: 51°38′40″N 16°55′30″E
- Country: Poland
- Voivodeship: Greater Poland
- County: Rawicz
- Gmina: Miejska Górka

Jagodnia [jaˈɡɔdɲa] is a village in the administrative district of Gmina Miejska Górka, within Rawicz County, Greater Poland Voivodeship, in west-central Poland.
