= Wydartowo Pierwsze =

- Village
- Location within Poland
- Coordinates: 51°43′12″N 16°48′36″E
- Country: Poland
- Voivodeship: Greater Poland
- County: Rawicz
- Gmina: Bojanowo

Wydartowo Pierwsze [vɨdarˈtɔvɔ ˈpjɛrfʂɛ] is a village in the administrative district of Gmina Bojanowo, within Rawicz County, Greater Poland Voivodeship, in west-central Poland.
