= Żołędnica, Greater Poland Voivodeship =

Żołędnica
- Village
- Location within Poland
- Coordinates: 51°39′9″N 16°53′35″E
- Country: Poland
- Voivodeship: Greater Poland
- County: Rawicz
- Gmina: Rawicz

Żołędnica [ʐɔwɛndˈnit͡sa] is a village in the administrative district of Gmina Rawicz, within Rawicz County, Greater Poland Voivodeship, in west-central Poland.
