= Folwark, Rawicz County =

Folwark
- Village
- Location within Poland
- Coordinates: 51°35′30″N 16°50′9″E
- Country: Poland
- Voivodeship: Greater Poland
- County: Rawicz
- Gmina: Rawicz
- Population: 80

Folwark [ˈfɔlvark] is a village in the administrative district of Gmina Rawicz, within Rawicz County, Greater Poland Voivodeship, in west-central Poland.
