= Gościejewice =

- Village
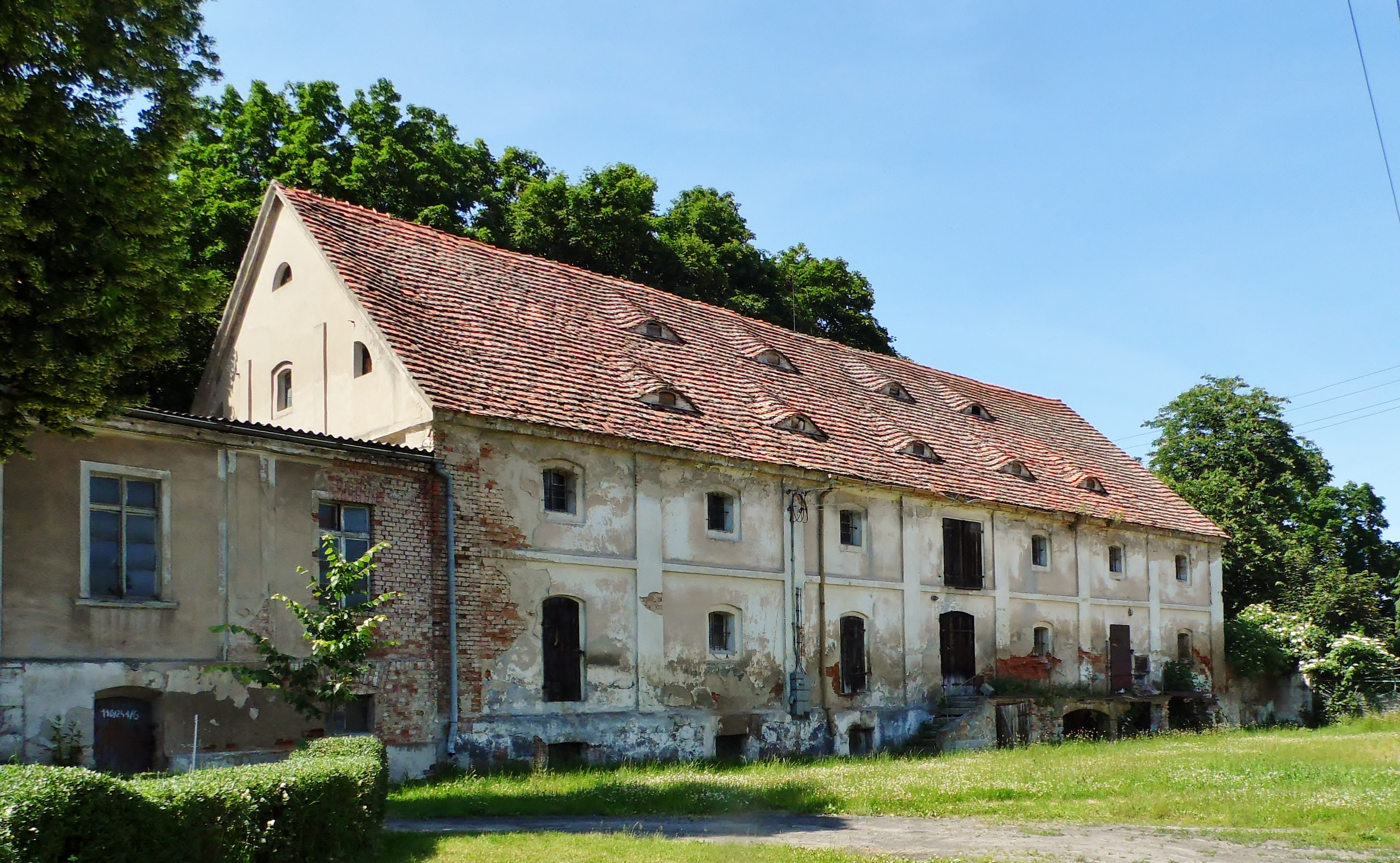
- Barn in Gościejewice

- Location within Poland
- Coordinates: 51°43′52″N 16°47′52″E
- Country: Poland
- Voivodeship: Greater Poland
- County: Rawicz
- Gmina: Bojanowo
- Population: 460

Gościejewice (Polish: [ɡɔɕt͡ɕɛjɛˈvit͡sɛ]) is a village in the administrative district of Gmina Bojanowo, within Rawicz County, Greater Poland Voivodeship, in west-central Poland.
