= Topólka, Greater Poland Voivodeship =

Topólka
- Settlement
- Location within Poland
- Coordinates: 51°40′36″N 17°2′27″E
- Country: Poland
- Voivodeship: Greater Poland
- County: Rawicz
- Gmina: Miejska Górka

Topólka [tɔˈpulka] is a settlement in the administrative district of Gmina Miejska Górka, within Rawicz County, Greater Poland Voivodeship, in west-central Poland.
