= Parłowice =

- Village
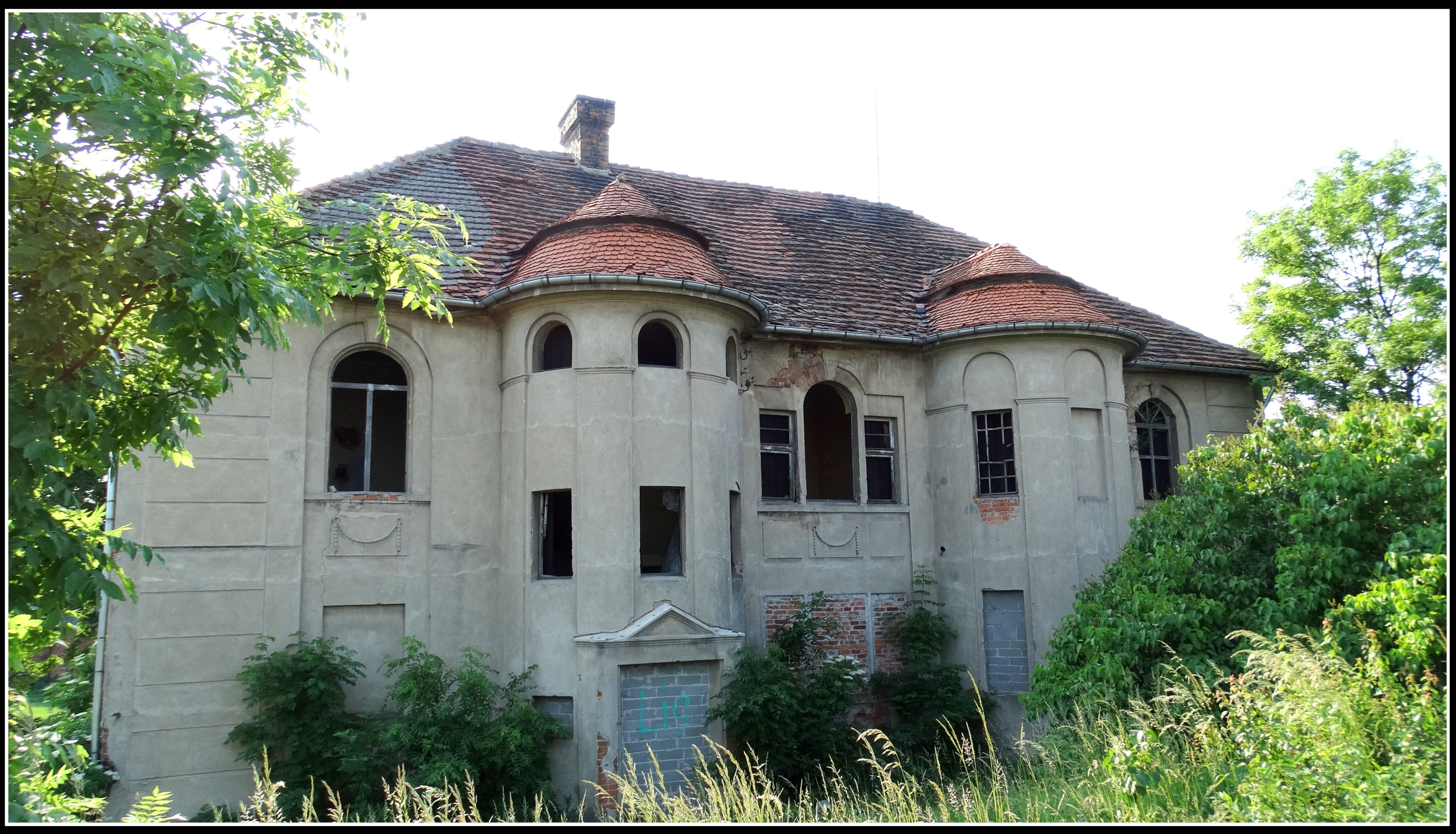
- Manor in Parłowice

- Location within Poland
- Coordinates: 51°40′40″N 16°40′33″E
- Country: Poland
- Voivodeship: Greater Poland
- County: Rawicz
- Gmina: Bojanowo

Parłowice [parwɔˈvit͡sɛ] is a village in the administrative district of Gmina Bojanowo, within Rawicz County, Greater Poland Voivodeship, in west-central Poland.
