= Gierłachowo, Rawicz County =

Gierłachowo
- Village
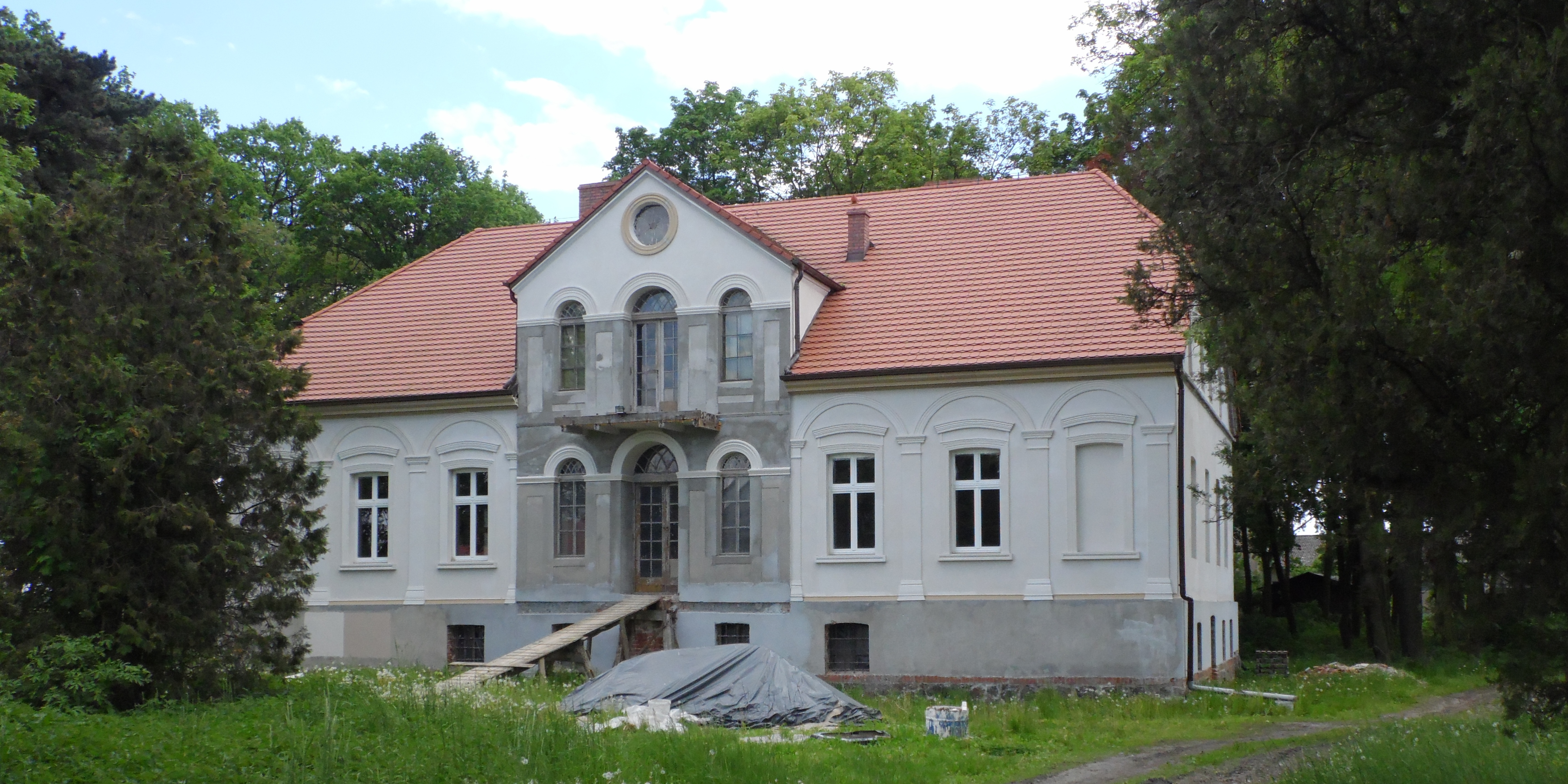
- Palace in Gierłachowo

- Location within Poland
- Coordinates: 51°41′N 16°49′E
- Country: Poland
- Voivodeship: Greater Poland
- County: Rawicz
- Gmina: Bojanowo
- Population: 102

Gierłachowo [ɡʲɛrwaˈxɔvɔ] is a village in the administrative district of Gmina Bojanowo, within Rawicz County, Greater Poland Voivodeship, in west-central Poland.
