= Golina Wielka =

- Village
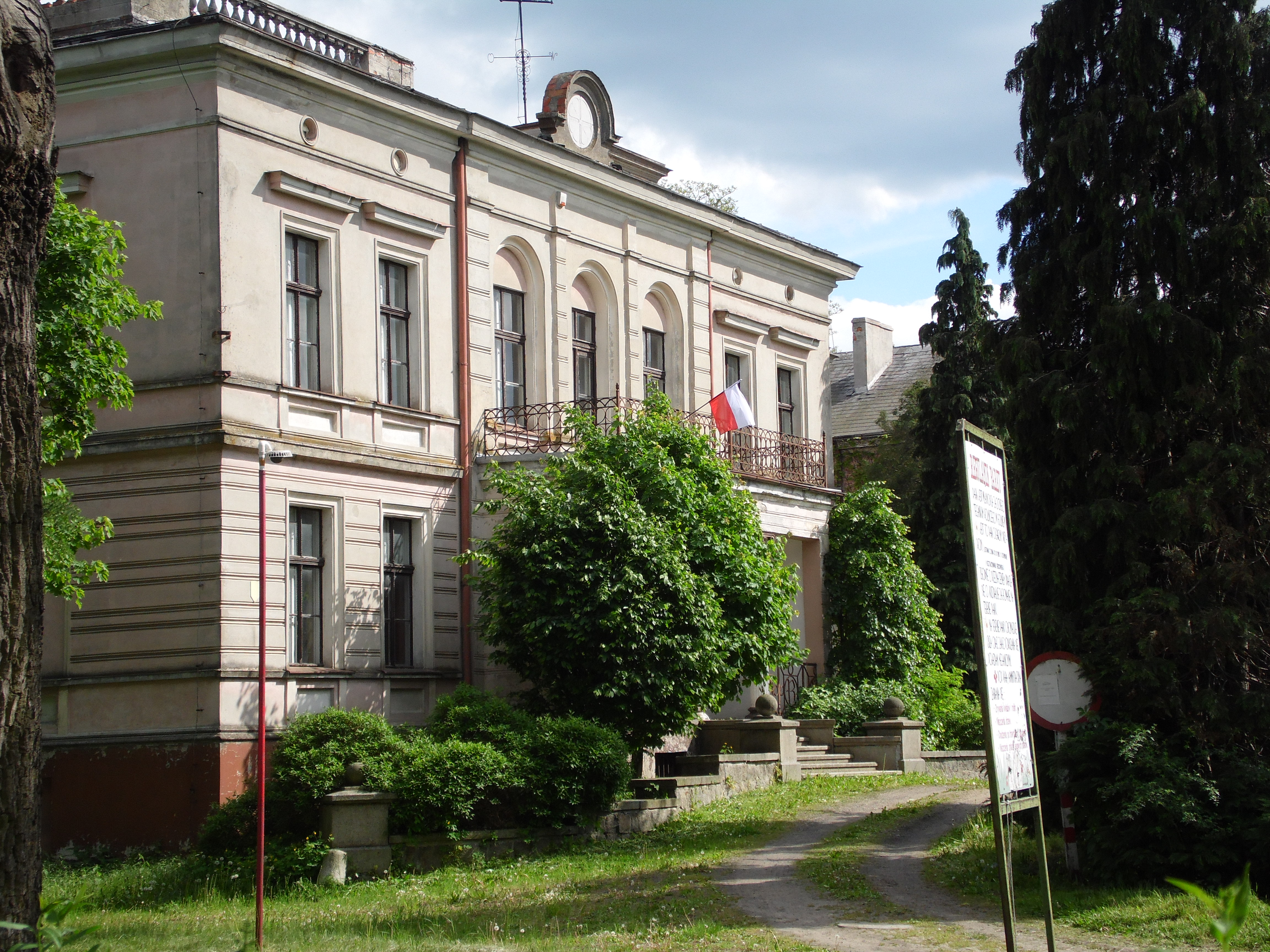
- Palace in the village

- Location within Poland
- Coordinates: 51°42′N 16°47′E
- Country: Poland
- Voivodeship: Greater Poland
- County: Rawicz
- Gmina: Bojanowo
- Time zone: UTC+1 (CET)
  - Summer (DST): UTC+2 (CEST)
- Vehicle registration: PRA

Golina Wielka [ɡɔˈlina ˈvjɛlka] is a village in the administrative district of Gmina Bojanowo, within Rawicz County, Greater Poland Voivodeship, in west-central Poland.

== History ==
As part of the region of Greater Poland, i.e. the cradle of the Polish state, the area formed part of Poland since its establishment in the 10th century. Golina was a private village of Polish nobility, administratively located in the Kościan County in the Poznań Voivodeship in the Greater Poland Province of the Kingdom of Poland.

During the German occupation of Poland (World War II), in 1941, the German gendarmerie carried out expulsions of Poles, whose houses and farms were then handed over to German colonists as part of the Lebensraum policy. Expelled Poles were enslaved as forced labour and sent either to Germany or to new German colonists in the county. Between 1941 and 1942 there was a German slave labour camp for Jews in Golina Wielka, and more than a dozen prisoners died from starvation or were killed there.
