= Jeziora =

Jeziora may refer to:

- Jeziora, Greater Poland Voivodeship (west-central Poland)
- Jeziora, Kuyavian-Pomeranian Voivodeship (north-central Poland)
- Jeziora, Masovian Voivodeship (east-central Poland)
