= Krystynki =

- Village
- Location within Poland
- Coordinates: 51°34′50″N 16°54′18″E
- Country: Poland
- Voivodeship: Greater Poland
- County: Rawicz
- Gmina: Rawicz
- Population: 4

Krystynki [krɨsˈtɨnki] is a village in the administrative district of Gmina Rawicz, within Rawicz County, Greater Poland Voivodeship, in west-central Poland.
