= Borek, Rawicz County =

Borek
- Settlement
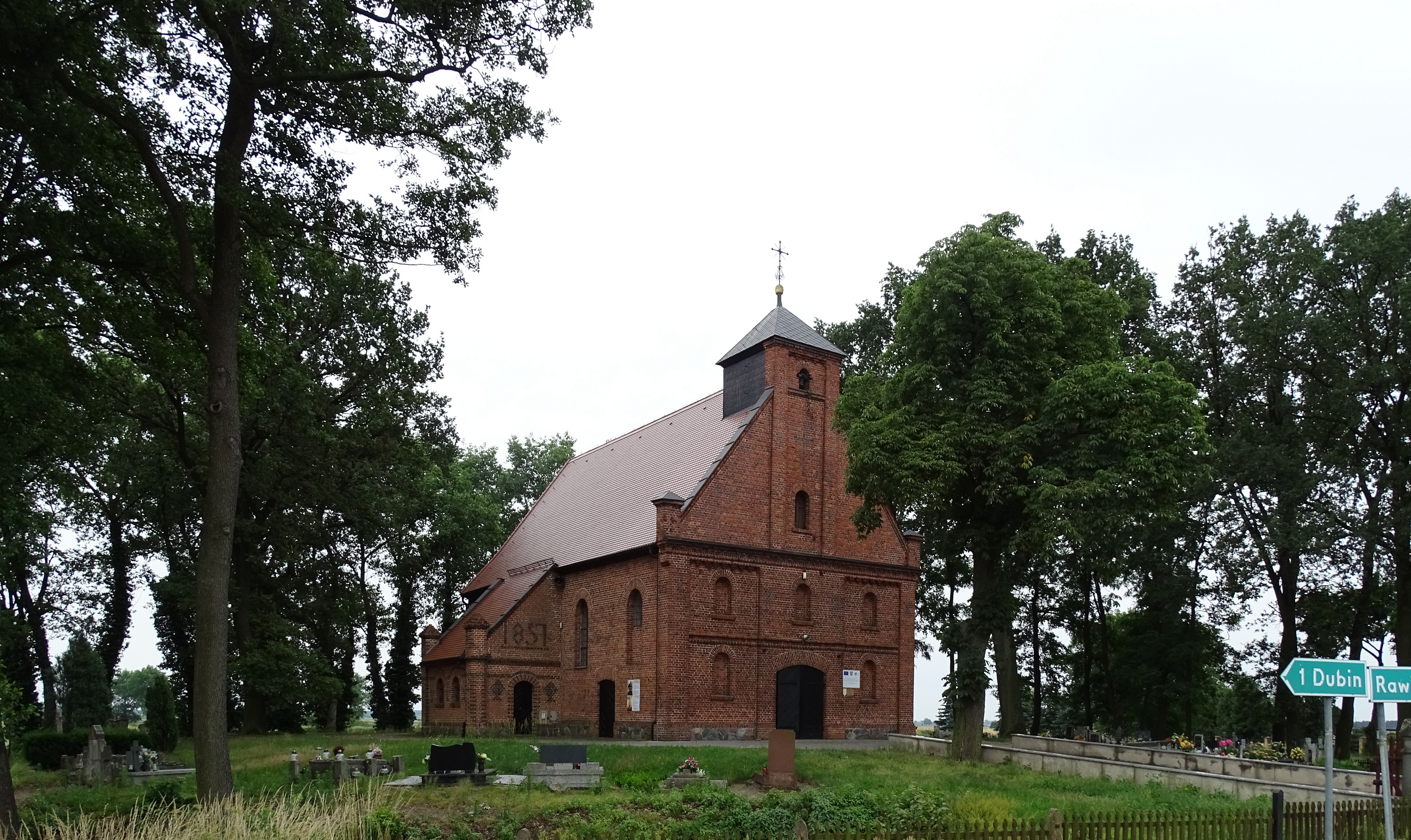
- Church in Borek

- Location within Poland
- Coordinates: 51°37′10.84″N 17°07′55.56″E
- Country: Poland
- Voivodeship: Greater Poland
- County: Rawicz
- Gmina: Jutrosin

Borek [ˈbɔrɛk] is a settlement in the administrative district of Gmina Jutrosin, within Rawicz County, Greater Poland Voivodeship, in west-central Poland.
