= Stasin, Greater Poland Voivodeship =

Stasin
- Settlement
- Location within Poland
- Coordinates: 51°35′24″N 17°11′26″E
- Country: Poland
- Voivodeship: Greater Poland
- County: Rawicz
- Gmina: Jutrosin

Stasin [ˈstaɕin] is a settlement in the administrative district of Gmina Jutrosin, within Rawicz County, Greater Poland Voivodeship, in west-central Poland.
