= Łaszczyn, Greater Poland Voivodeship =

Łaszczyn
- Village
- Location within Poland
- Coordinates: 51°38′21″N 16°51′42″E
- Country: Poland
- Voivodeship: Greater Poland
- County: Rawicz
- Gmina: Rawicz

Łaszczyn [ˈwaʂt͡ʂɨn] is a village in the administrative district of Gmina Rawicz, within Rawicz County, Greater Poland Voivodeship, in west-central Poland.
