= Władysław Puślecki =

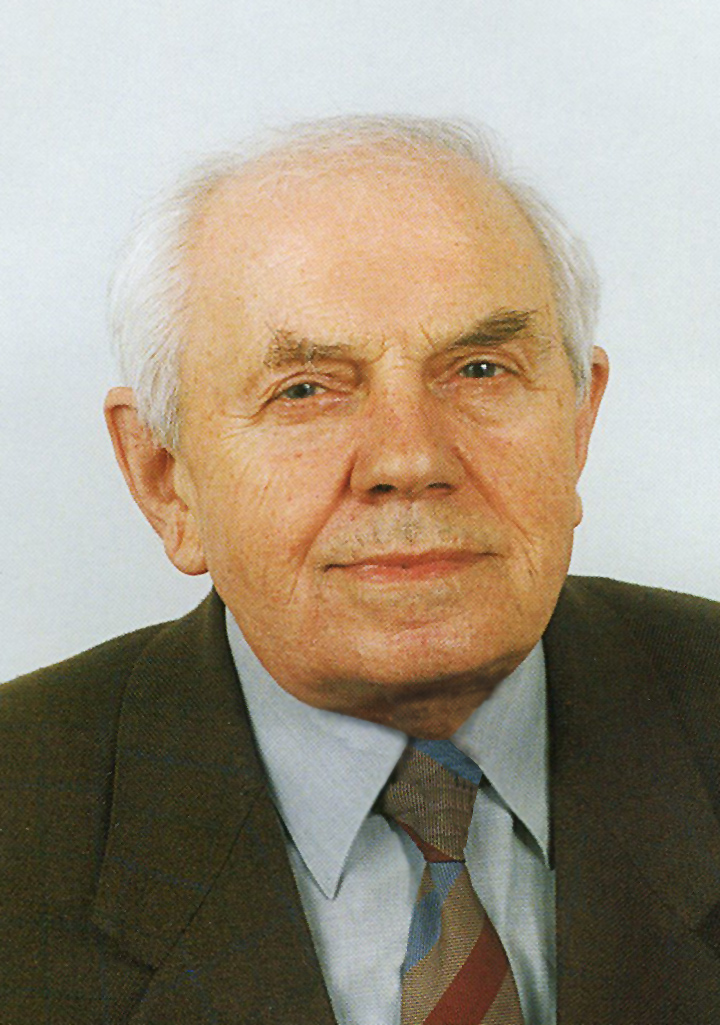
- Born: 11 May 1933; Bartoszewice, Poland
- Died: 8 December 2008 (aged 75); Opole, Poland
- Citizenship: Poland
- Scientific career
- Fields: Pedagogy
- Workplaces: Opole University; Polish Academy of Sciences; Silesian Institute

Władysław Puślecki (born 11 May 1933 in Bartoszewice, Poland, died 8 December 2008 in Opole, Poland) – was a Polish pedagogist, professor of Humanities, specialist in the field of general and alternative didactic methods, propagator of student subjectivity (Polish: „pełnomocność ucznia”), researcher of school of the future, educator of few teachers generations.
