= Nowy Sielec =

- Village
- Location within Poland
- Coordinates: 51°39′10″N 17°08′10″E
- Country: Poland
- Voivodeship: Greater Poland
- County: Rawicz
- Gmina: Jutrosin

Nowy Sielec [ˈnɔvɨ ˈɕɛlɛt͡s] is a village in the administrative district of Gmina Jutrosin, within Rawicz County, Greater Poland Voivodeship, in west-central Poland.
