= Niemarzyn =

- Village
- Location within Poland
- Coordinates: 51°38′N 16°58′E
- Country: Poland
- Voivodeship: Greater Poland
- County: Rawicz
- Gmina: Miejska Górka

Niemarzyn [ɲɛˈmaʐɨn] is a village in the administrative district of Gmina Miejska Górka, within Rawicz County, Greater Poland Voivodeship, in west-central Poland.
