= Sułów Mały =

- Village
- Location within Poland
- Coordinates: 51°39′09″N 16°41′57″E
- Country: Poland
- Voivodeship: Greater Poland
- County: Rawicz
- Gmina: Bojanowo

Sułów Mały [ˈsuwuf ˈmawɨ] is a village in the administrative district of Gmina Bojanowo, within Rawicz County, Greater Poland Voivodeship, in west-central Poland.
