= Płaczkowo, Rawicz County =

Płaczkowo
- Village
- Location within Poland
- Coordinates: 51°41′N 17°7′E
- Country: Poland
- Voivodeship: Greater Poland
- County: Rawicz
- Gmina: Jutrosin

Płaczkowo [pwat͡ʂˈkɔvɔ] is a village in the administrative district of Gmina Jutrosin, within Rawicz County, Greater Poland Voivodeship, in west-central Poland.
