= Zielona Wieś, Greater Poland Voivodeship =

Zielona Wieś
- Village
- Location within Poland
- Coordinates: 51°34′N 16°57′E
- Country: Poland
- Voivodeship: Greater Poland
- County: Rawicz
- Gmina: Rawicz

Zielona Wieś (Polish: [ʑɛˈlɔna ˈvjɛɕ]) is a village in the administrative district of Gmina Rawicz, within Rawicz County, Greater Poland Voivodeship, in west-central Poland.
