= Kąty, Rawicz County =

Kąty
- Village
- Location within Poland
- Coordinates: 51°35′N 16°52′E
- Country: Poland
- Voivodeship: Greater Poland
- County: Rawicz
- Gmina: Rawicz

Kąty [ˈkɔntɨ] is a village in the administrative district of Gmina Rawicz, within Rawicz County, Greater Poland Voivodeship, in west-central Poland.
