= Ostoje =

Ostoje may refer to:

- Ostoje, Greater Poland Voivodeship, a village in the administrative district of Gmina Jutrosin, within Rawicz County, Greater Poland Voivodeship, in west-central Poland
- Ostoje, Masovian Voivodeship, a village in the administrative district of Gmina Mordy, within Siedlce County, Masovian Voivodeship, in east-central Poland
