= Konary, Rawicz County =

Konary
- Village
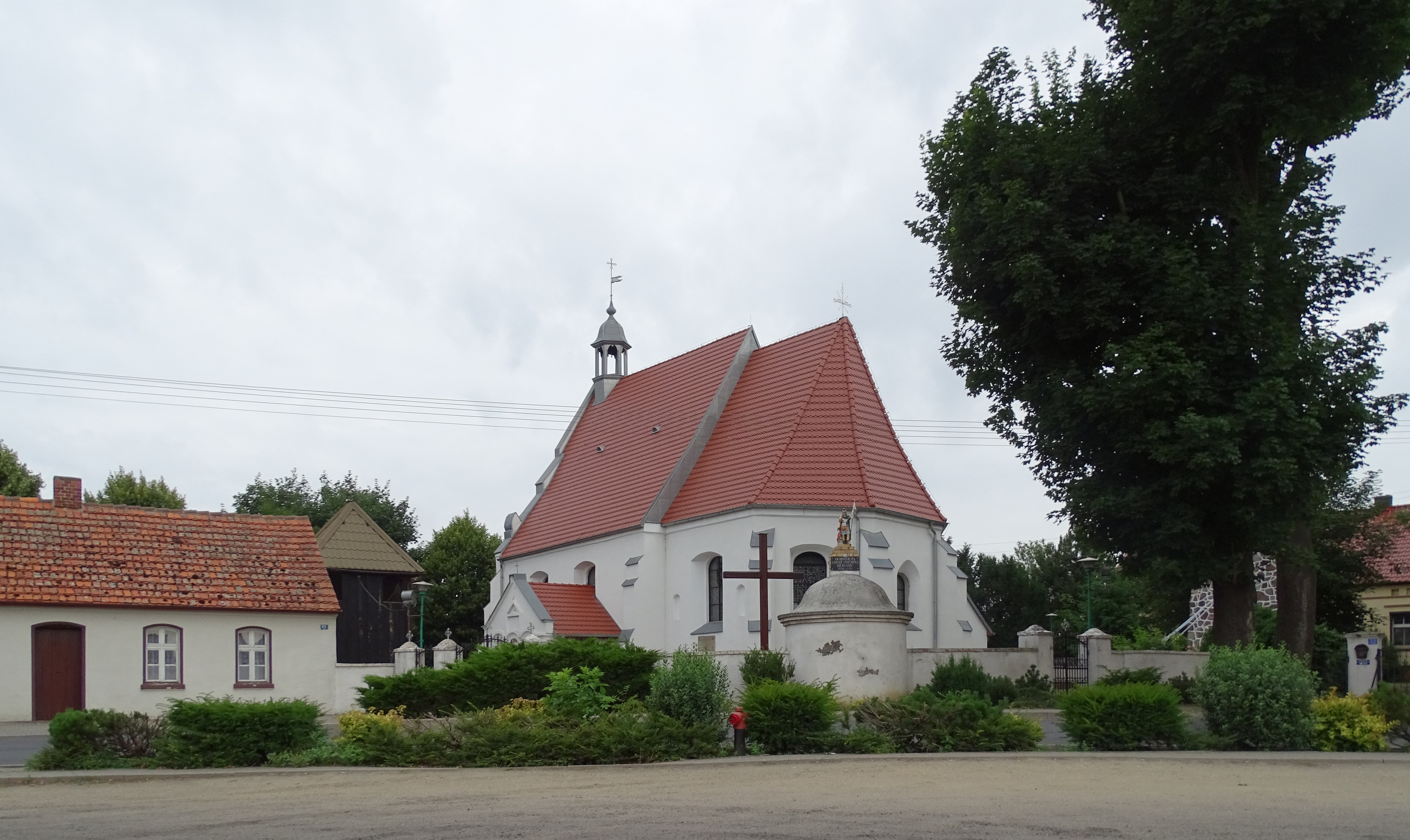
- Parish church from 1512

- Location within Poland
- Coordinates: 51°40′N 17°3′E
- Country: Poland
- Voivodeship: Greater Poland
- County: Rawicz
- Gmina: Miejska Górka
- Population: 1,100

Konary [kɔˈnarɨ] is a village in the administrative district of Gmina Miejska Górka, within Rawicz County, Greater Poland Voivodeship, in west-central Poland.
