= Sowiny =

- Village
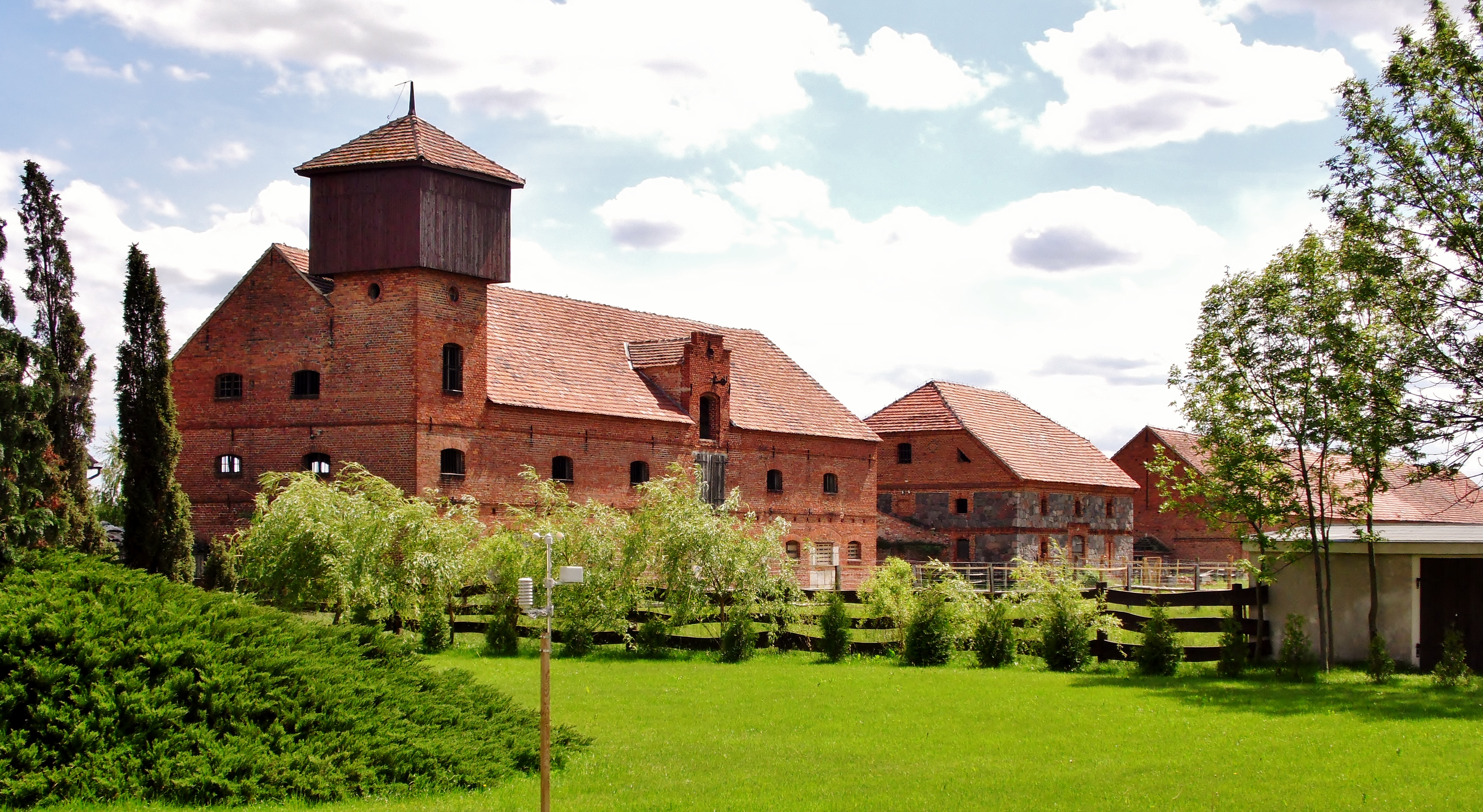
- Farm in Sowiny

- Location within Poland
- Coordinates: 51°43′N 16°49′E
- Country: Poland
- Voivodeship: Greater Poland
- County: Rawicz
- Gmina: Bojanowo

Sowiny [sɔˈvinɨ] is a village in the administrative district of Gmina Bojanowo, within Rawicz County, Greater Poland Voivodeship, in west-central Poland.
