= Gostkowski =

Gostkowski (feminine: Gostkowska) is a Polish-language surname. Notable people with the surname include:

- Rajmund Gostkowski pl:Rajmund Gostkowski (1885–1966), an archaeologist
- Roman Gostkowski pl:Roman Gostkowski (1837–1912), a railway engineer, professor
- Stephen Gostkowski (born 1984), an American football player
- Wincenty Gostkowski (1807–1884), a lawyer and watchmaker
- Wojciech Gostkowski pl:Wojciech Gostkowski, 17th century mercantilism economist
- Zofia Moraczewska née Gostkowska (1873–1958), a Polish politician and women's rights activist.

== See also ==
- Gostkowo
