= Zalesie, Rawicz County =

Zalesie
- Village
- Location within Poland
- Coordinates: 51°40′14″N 17°4′51″E
- Country: Poland
- Voivodeship: Greater Poland
- County: Rawicz
- Gmina: Miejska Górka

Zalesie [zaˈlɛɕɛ] is a village in the administrative district of Gmina Miejska Górka, within Rawicz County, Greater Poland Voivodeship, in west-central Poland.
