= Rzyczkowo =

- Village
- Location within Poland
- Coordinates: 51°41′N 17°0′E
- Country: Poland
- Voivodeship: Greater Poland
- County: Rawicz
- Gmina: Miejska Górka

Rzyczkowo [ʐɨt͡ʂˈkɔvɔ] is a village in the administrative district of Gmina Miejska Górka, within Rawicz County, Greater Poland Voivodeship, in west-central Poland.
