= Standesamt Rawitsch =

Standesamt Rawitsch is one of several civil registration districts (Standesamt) located in Kreis Rawitsch of the Prussian province of Posen and administered the communities of:

Community	Polish spelling	1895 Pop	Prot	Cath	Jew	Other
Rawitsch	Rawicz	12362		3408	768	29
Damme		698	642	50		6
Buchwerder, Forstgutsbezirk		9	9
Der Zeptor
Gründorf		526	9	517
Hopfengarten
Izbice		312	23	289
Karlsruh		10	8	2
Kubeczki		123	0	123
Laszczyn		278	0	278
Laszczyn		221	12	209
Lindenhof		48	15	33
Lonkta		297	0	297
Massel		298	241	57
Niedzwiadki		179	0	179
Sikorzyn		63	60	3
Slupia		1091	8	1083
Stwolno		173	4	169
Stwolno		57	11	46
Sworowo		397	0	397
Sworowo		70	7	6
Szymanowo		610	425	185
Ugoda		257	0	257
Wilhelmsgrund		896	559	337
Wydawy		554	2	337
Zawady		258	0	258
Zylice		201	193	8

At the junction of rail lines to Posen and Liegnitz.

An important industry was the manufacture of snuff and cigars. Trade involved grain, wool, cattle, hides, and timber.
