= Żydowski Bród =

- Settlement
- Location within Poland
- Coordinates: 51°37′59″N 17°13′16″E
- Country: Poland
- Voivodeship: Greater Poland
- County: Rawicz
- Gmina: Jutrosin

Żydowski Bród [ʐɨˈdɔfski ˈbrut] is a settlement in the administrative district of Gmina Jutrosin, within Rawicz County, Greater Poland Voivodeship, in west-central Poland.
