= Ostoje, Greater Poland Voivodeship =

Ostoje
- Village
- Location within Poland
- Coordinates: 51°34′N 17°9′E
- Country: Poland
- Voivodeship: Greater Poland
- County: Rawicz
- Gmina: Jutrosin

Ostoje [ɔsˈtɔjɛ] is a village in the administrative district of Gmina Jutrosin, within Rawicz County, Greater Poland Voivodeship, in west-central Poland.
