= Gmina Miejska Górka =

Gmina Miejska Górka Miejska Górka Commune
- Gmina
- Coat of arms

- Coordinates (Miejska Górka): 51°39′20″N 16°57′40″E
- Country: Poland
- Voivodeship: Greater Poland
- County: Rawicz
- Seat: Miejska Górka

Area
  - Total: 103.62 km^{2} (40.01 sq mi)

Population (2006)
  - Total: 9,283
  - Density: 89.59/km^{2} (232.0/sq mi)
  - Urban: 3,128
  - Rural: 6,155
- Website: https://www.miejska-gorka.pl/

Gmina Miejska Górka is an urban-rural gmina (administrative district) in Rawicz County, Greater Poland Voivodeship, in west-central Poland. Its seat is the town of Miejska Górka, which lies approximately 9 kilometres (6 mi) north-east of Rawicz and 83 km (52 mi) south of the regional capital Poznań.

The gmina covers an area of 103.62 square kilometres (40.0 sq mi), and as of 2006 its total population was 9,283 (out of which the population of Miejska Górka amounted to 3,128, and the population of the rural part of the gmina was 6,155).

== Villages ==
Apart from the town of Miejska Górka, Gmina Miejska Górka contains the villages and settlements of Annopol, Dąbrowa, Dłoń, Gostkowo, Jagodnia, Karolinki, Kołaczkowice, Konary, Melanowo, Niemarzyn, Oczkowice, Piaski, Roszkówko, Roszkowo, Rozstępniewo, Rzyczkowo, Sobiałkowo, Topólka, Woszczkowo, Zakrzewo, Zalesie and Zmysłowo.

== Neighbouring gminas ==
Gmina Miejska Górka is bordered by the gminas of Bojanowo, Jutrosin, Krobia, Pakosław, Pępowo, Poniec and Rawicz.
