= Gmina Rawicz =

Gmina Rawicz Rawicz Commune
- Gmina
- Coat of arms

- Coordinates (Rawicz): 51°36′33″N 16°51′27″E
- Country: Poland
- Voivodeship: Greater Poland
- County: Rawicz
- Seat: Rawicz

Area
  - Total: 133.64 km^{2} (51.60 sq mi)

Population (2006)
  - Total: 29,434
  - Density: 220.25/km^{2} (570.44/sq mi)
  - Urban: 21,301
  - Rural: 8,133
- Website: http://rawicz.zapis.net.pl/cache/7/327/

Gmina Rawicz is an urban-rural gmina (administrative district) in Rawicz County, Greater Poland Voivodeship, in west-central Poland. Its seat is the town of Rawicz, which lies approximately 88 kilometres (55 mi) south of the regional capital Poznań.

The gmina covers an area of 133.64 square kilometres (51.6 sq mi), and as of 2006 its total population was 29,434 (out of which the population of Rawicz amounted to 21,301, and the population of the rural part of the gmina was 8,133).

== Villages ==
Apart from the town of Rawicz, Gmina Rawicz contains the villages and settlements of Dąbrówka, Dębno Polskie, Folwark, Izbice, Kąty, Konarzewo, Krasnolipka, Krystynki, Łąkta, Łaszczyn, Masłowo, Masłowo-Warszewo, Sarnówka, Sierakowo, Sikorzyn, Słupia Kapitulna, Stwolno, Szymanowo, Ugoda, Wydawy, Załęcze, Zawady, Zielona Wieś, Żołędnica and Żylice.

== Neighbouring gminas ==
Gmina Rawicz is bordered by the gminas of Bojanowo, Miejska Górka, Milicz, Pakosław, Wąsosz and Żmigród.
