= Gmina Bojanowo =

Gmina Bojanowo Bojanowo Commune
- Gmina
- Flag Coat of arms

- Coordinates (Bojanowo): 51°42′N 16°45′E
- Country: Poland
- Voivodeship: Greater Poland
- County: Rawicz
- Seat: Bojanowo

Area
  - Total: 123.5 km^{2} (47.7 sq mi)

Population (2006)
  - Total: 8,938
  - Density: 72.37/km^{2} (187.4/sq mi)
  - Urban: 3,014
  - Rural: 5,924
- Website: http://www.gminabojanowo.pl/

Gmina Bojanowo is an urban-rural gmina (administrative district) in Rawicz County, Greater Poland Voivodeship, in west-central Poland. Its seat is the town of Bojanowo, which lies approximately 13 kilometres (8 mi) north-west of Rawicz and 79 km (49 mi) south of the regional capital Poznań.

The gmina covers an area of 123.5 square kilometres (47.7 sq mi), and as of 2006, its total population was 8,938. Of this number, 3,014 residents lived in Bojanowo, while 5,924 lived in the rural part of the gmina.

== Villages ==
Apart from the town of Bojanowo, Gmina Bojanowo contains the villages and settlements of Czechnów, Gierłachowo, Giżyn, Gołaszyn, Golina Wielka, Golinka, Gościejewice, Kawcze, Pakówka, Parłowice, Potrzebowo, Sowiny, Sułów Mały, Szemzdrowo, Tarchalin, Trzebosz, Wydartowo Drugie, Wydartowo Pierwsze and Zaborowice.

== Neighbouring gminas ==
Gmina Bojanowo is bordered by the gminas of Góra, Miejska Górka, Poniec, Rawicz, Rydzyna and Wąsosz.
