= Bojanowo =

Town in Greater Poland Voivodeship, Poland

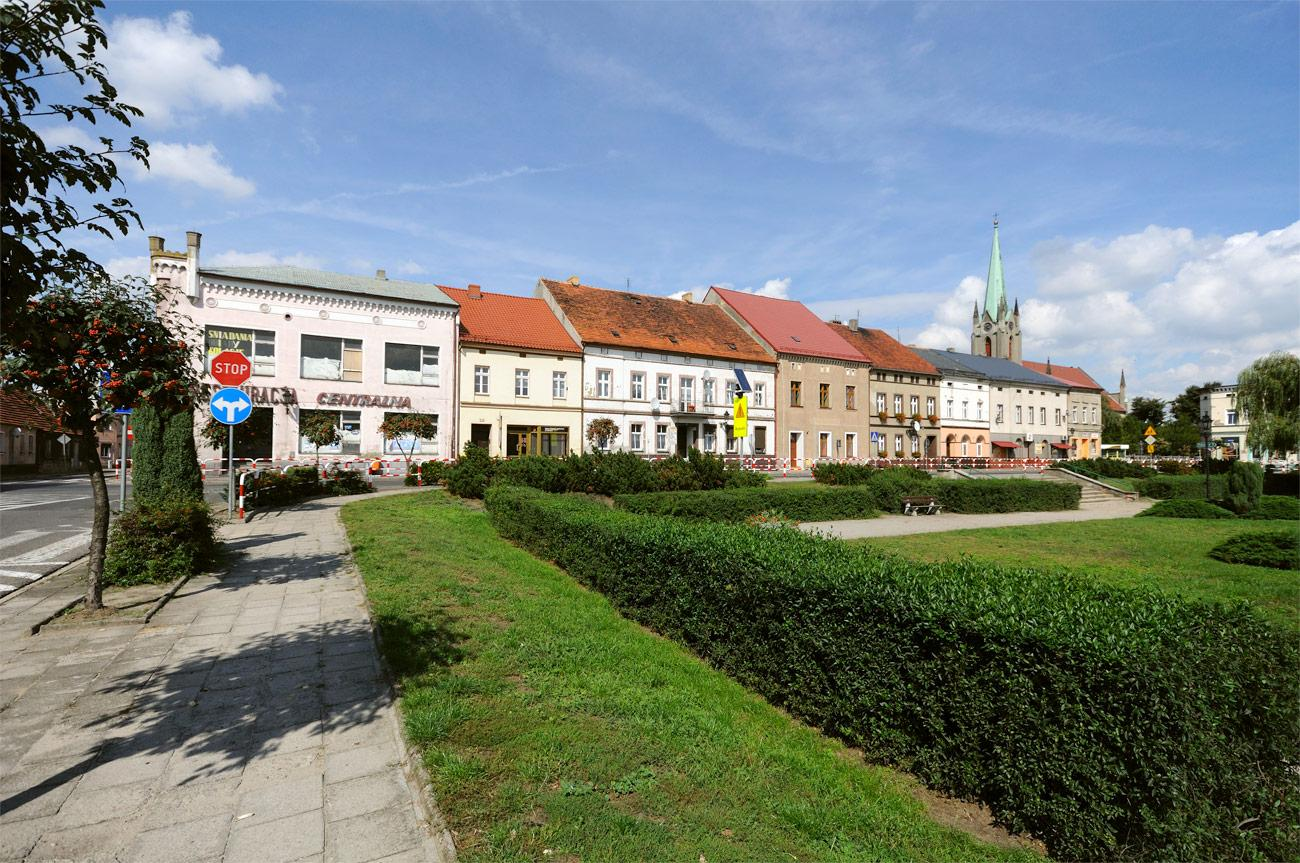
- Main Square

- Flag Coat of arms

- Location within Poland
- Coordinates: 51°42′N 16°45′E
- Country: Poland
- Voivodeship: Greater Poland
- County: Rawicz
- Gmina: Bojanowo
- Established: 14th century
- Town rights: 1638

Government
  - Mayor: Maciej Dubiel

Area
  - Total: 2.34 km^{2} (0.90 sq mi)

Population (30 June 2021)
  - Total: 2,895
  - Density: 1,240/km^{2} (3,200/sq mi)
- Time zone: UTC+1 (CET)
  - Summer (DST): UTC+2 (CEST)
- Postal code: 63-940
- Area code: +48 65
- Vehicle registration: PRA
- Website: bojanowo.pl

Bojanowo ([bɔjaˈnɔvɔ]) is a town in Rawicz County, Greater Poland Voivodeship, western Poland. It is the seat of Gmina Bojanowo (commune). As of June 2021, it has a population of 2,895.

== History ==
As part of the region of Greater Poland, i.e. the cradle of the Polish state, the area formed part of Poland since its establishment in the 10th century. Bojanowo was granted town rights in 1638. It was administratively located in the Poznań Voivodeship in the Greater Poland Province of the Kingdom of Poland. It was annexed by Prussia in the Second Partition of Poland. Following the successful Greater Poland uprising of 1806, it was regained by Poles and included within the short-lived Duchy of Warsaw. After its dissolution in 1815, it was re-annexed by Prussia, within which it was located in the Kreis Rawitsch of Provinz Posen. Following World War I, Poland regained independence and control of the town.

Following the German-Soviet invasion of Poland, which started World War II in September 1939, the town was occupied by Germany until 1945. In December 1939, the occupiers carried out expulsions of Poles, mostly craftsmen, postal workers and intelligentsia with entire families, as well as several local Jews. Houses and workshops of the expellees were handed over to German colonists as part of the Lebensraum policy. A local school teacher and several graduates of the local agricultural college were murdered by the Russians in the Katyn massacre in 1940. The Polish resistance movement was present in Bojanowo. In June 1944, the Gestapo arrested both the commander and deputy commander of the local unit of the Home Army, who were then subjected to brutal interrogations, and eventually sent to concentration camps and killed there.

== Demographics ==
Historical population

Year	Pop.	±%
1810	2,673	—
1843	2,204	−17.5%
1871	2,017	−8.5%
1880	2,207	+9.4%
1890	1,918	−13.1%
1900	2,099	+9.4%

Year	Pop.	±%
1910	2,290	+9.1%
1921	1,862	−18.7%
1931	2,333	+25.3%
1939	3,025	+29.7%
1950	2,533	−16.3%
2010	2,953	+16.6%

== Transport ==
The S5 expressway bypasses Bojanowo to the west. The Bojanowo exit of the expressway provides for quick access to Poznań and Wrocław.

Voivodeship road 309 passes right through Bojanowo.

Bojanowo has a station on the Poznań-Wrocław railway line.

== Sports ==
The local football club is Ruch Bojanowo. It competes in the lower leagues.

== Notable residents ==
- Julius Frauenstädt (1813-1879), German philosopher
- Gottschalk Eduard Guhrauer (1809–1854), German philologist and biographer
