= Jeziora, Greater Poland Voivodeship =

Jeziora
- Village
- Location within Poland
- Coordinates: 51°34′55″N 17°11′29″E
- Country: Poland
- Voivodeship: Greater Poland
- County: Rawicz
- Gmina: Jutrosin

Jeziora [jɛˈʑɔra] is a village in the administrative district of Gmina Jutrosin, within Rawicz County, Greater Poland Voivodeship, in west-central Poland.
