= Gostkowo, Greater Poland Voivodeship =

Gostkowo
- Village
- Location within Poland
- Coordinates: 51°42′01″N 16°58′45″E
- Country: Poland
- Voivodeship: Greater Poland
- County: Rawicz
- Gmina: Miejska Górka

Gostkowo [ɡɔstˈkɔvɔ] is a village in the administrative district of Gmina Miejska Górka, within Rawicz County, Greater Poland Voivodeship, in west-central Poland.
