= Gostkowo =

Gostkowo may refer to the following places:

- Gostkowo, Kuyavian-Pomeranian Voivodeship (north-central Poland)
- Gostkowo, Ciechanów County in Masovian Voivodeship (east-central Poland)
- Gostkowo, Bytów County in Pomeranian Voivodeship (north Poland)
- Gostkowo, Gmina Szulborze Wielkie, Ostrów County in Masovian Voivodeship (east-central Poland)
- Gostkowo, Przasnysz County in Masovian Voivodeship (east-central Poland)
- Gostkowo, Pułtusk County in Masovian Voivodeship (east-central Poland)
- Gostkowo, Greater Poland Voivodeship (west-central Poland)
- Gostkowo, Słupsk County in Pomeranian Voivodeship (north Poland)
- Gostkowo, West Pomeranian Voivodeship (north-west Poland)
