= Konarzewo, Rawicz County =

Konarzewo
- Village
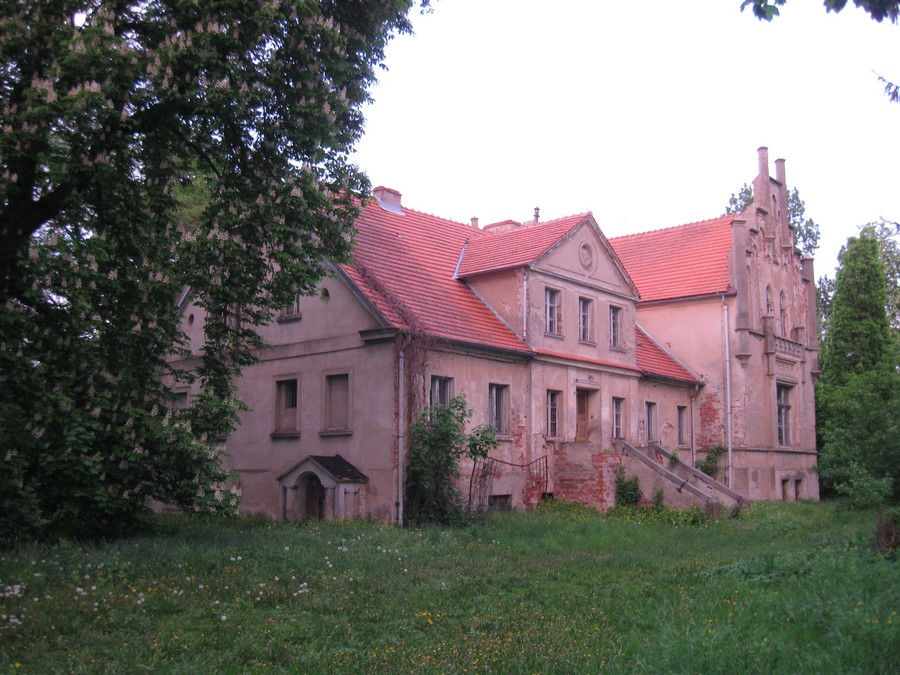
- Manor in Konarzewo

- Location within Poland
- Coordinates: 51°39′24″N 16°51′6″E
- Country: Poland
- Voivodeship: Greater Poland
- County: Rawicz
- Gmina: Rawicz

Konarzewo [kɔnaˈʐɛvɔ] is a village in the administrative district of Gmina Rawicz, within Rawicz County, Greater Poland Voivodeship, in west-central Poland.
