= Dubin =

- Village
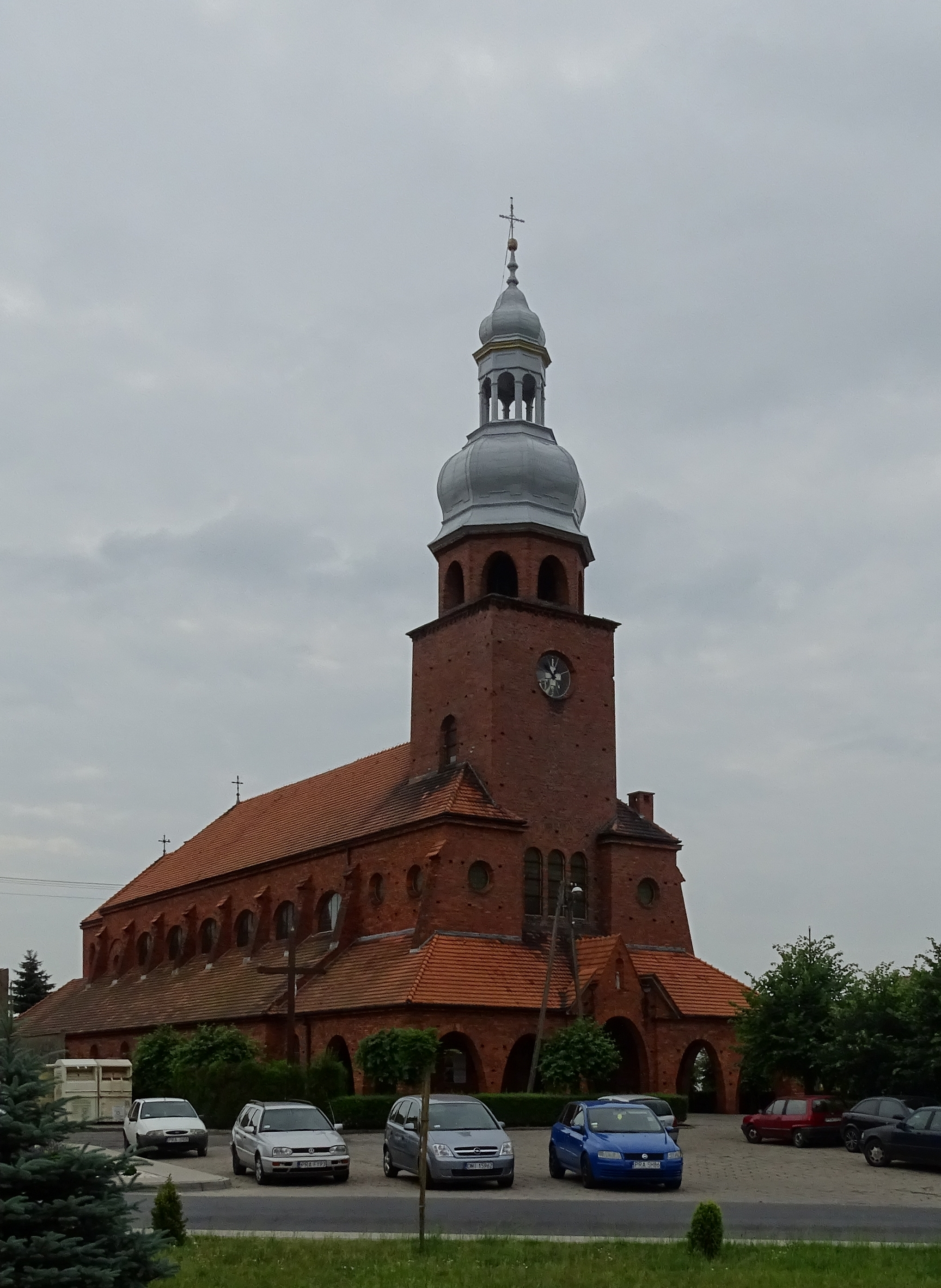
- Parish church

- Location within Poland
- Coordinates: 51°37′N 17°8′E
- Country: Poland
- Voivodeship: Greater Poland
- County: Rawicz
- Gmina: Jutrosin
- Population: 710

Dubin [ˈdubin] is a village in the administrative district of Gmina Jutrosin, within Rawicz County, Greater Poland Voivodeship, in west-central Poland.
