= Gmina Jutrosin =

Gmina Jutrosin Jutrosin Commune
- Gmina
- Coat of arms

- Coordinates (Jutrosin): 51°38′50″N 17°10′10″E
- Country: Poland
- Voivodeship: Greater Poland
- County: Rawicz
- Seat: Jutrosin

Area
  - Total: 114.93 km^{2} (44.37 sq mi)

Population (2006)
  - Total: 7,070
  - Density: 61.5/km^{2} (159/sq mi)
  - Urban: 1,872
  - Rural: 5,198
- Website: http://www.jutrosin.pl/

Gmina Jutrosin is an urban-rural gmina (administrative district) in Rawicz County, Greater Poland Voivodeship, in west-central Poland. Its seat is the town of Jutrosin, which lies approximately 22 kilometres (14 mi) east of Rawicz and 86 km (53 mi) south of the regional capital Poznań.

The gmina covers an area of 114.93 square kilometres (44.4 sq mi). As of 2006, its total population was 7,070, of which Jutrosin accounted for 1,872 residents and the rural areas for 5,198.

== Villages ==
Apart from the town of Jutrosin, Gmina Jutrosin contains the villages and settlements of Bartoszewice, Bębina, Bielawy, Bonowo, Borek, Domaradzice, Dubin, Grąbkowo, Janowo, Jeziora, Katarzynowo, Nadstaw, Nowy Sielec, Ochłoda, Ostoje, Pawłowo, Piskornia, Płaczkowo, Rogożewo, Śląskowo, Stary Sielec, Stasin, Szkaradowo, Szymonki, Wielki Bór, Zaborowo, Zmysłowo, Żydowski Bród and Zygmuntowo.

== Neighbouring gminas ==
Gmina Jutrosin is bordered by the gminas of Cieszków, Kobylin, Miejska Górka, Milicz, Pakosław, Pępowo and Zduny.
