= Miejska Górka =

Town in Greater Poland Voivodeship, Poland

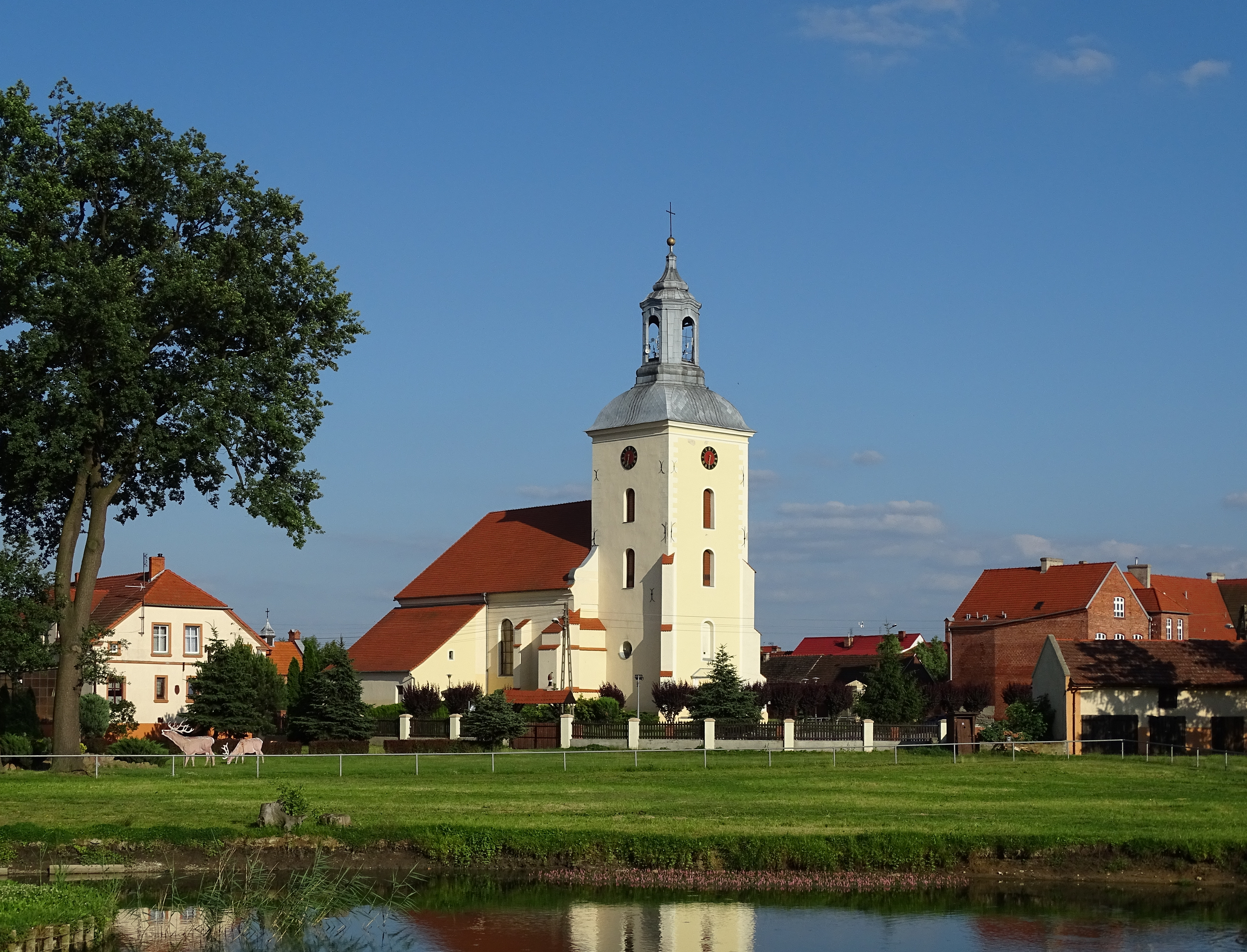
- Church of Saints Nicholas and Mary Magdalene

- Coat of arms

- Location within Poland
- Coordinates: 51°39′20″N 16°57′40″E
- Country: Poland
- Voivodeship: Greater Poland
- County: Rawicz
- Gmina: Miejska Górka
- Town rights: before 1406

Area
  - Total: 3.09 km^{2} (1.19 sq mi)

Population (2010)
  - Total: 3,190
  - Density: 1,030/km^{2} (2,670/sq mi)
- Time zone: UTC+1 (CET)
  - Summer (DST): UTC+2 (CEST)
- Postal code: 63-910
- Vehicle registration: PRA
- Website: https://www.miejska-gorka.pl/

Miejska Górka [ˈmʲɛi̯ska ˈɡurka] is a town in Rawicz County, Greater Poland Voivodeship, Poland. It is the seat of Gmina Miejska Górka.

== History ==
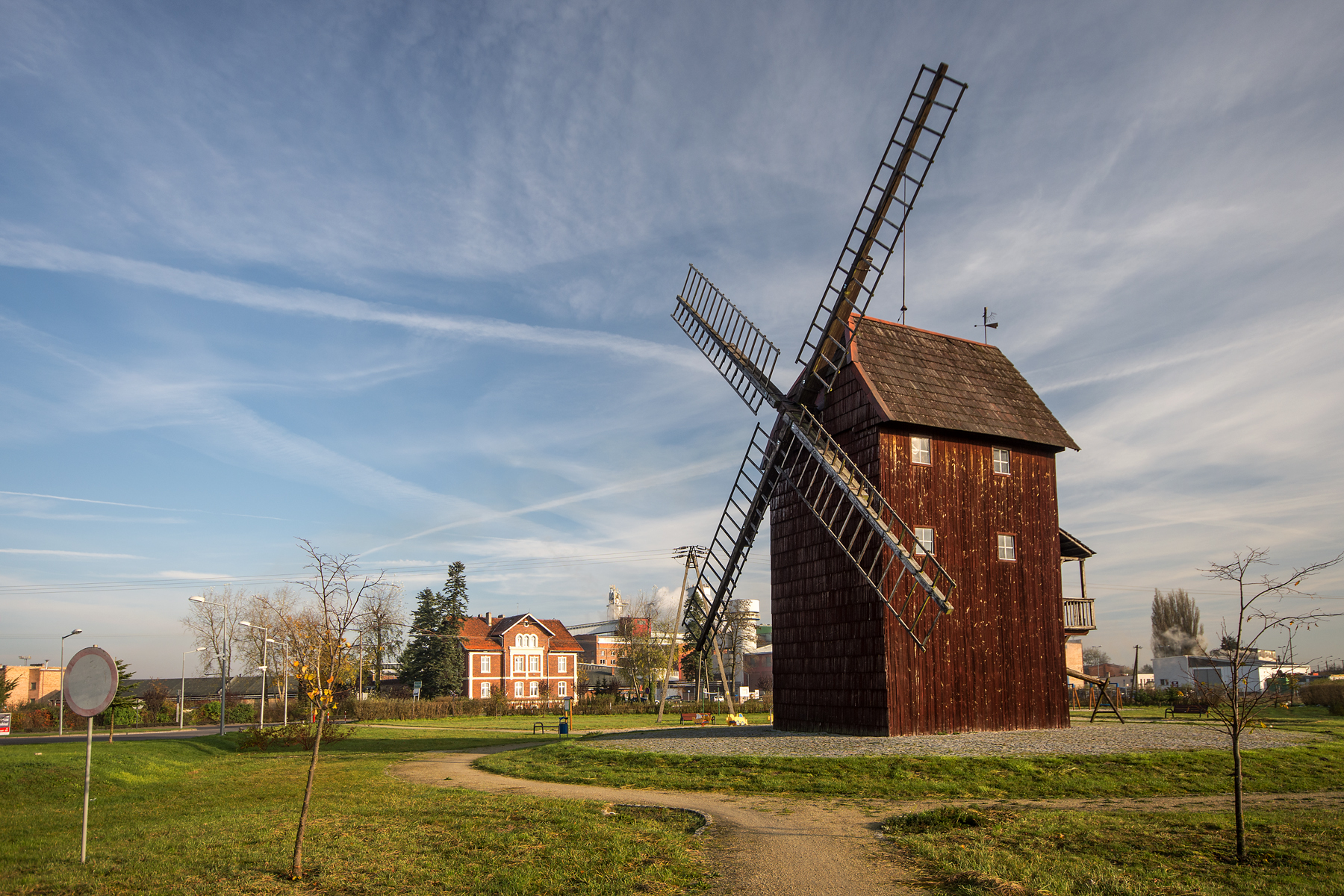
A preserved windmill

Miejska Górka was granted town rights before 1406. It was a private town, administratively located in the Kościan County in the Poznań Voivodeship in the Greater Poland Province of the Kingdom of Poland.

Following the joint German-Soviet invasion of Poland, which started World War II in September 1939, Miejska Górka was occupied by Germany until 1945. The occupiers operated a subcamp of the Nazi prison in Rawicz, dedicated to prisoners suffering from tuberculosis. On 22 May 1941, the Germans perpetrated a public execution of 25 Poles in the town (see Nazi crimes against the Polish nation). The command of the Miejscowa Organizacja Podziemna Polish resistance organization was operating in Miejska Górka, and eventually became part of the larger Home Army in 1944.

== Demographics ==
Historical population

Year	Pop.	±%
1871	1,761	—
1880	1,792	+1.8%
1890	2,012	+12.3%
1900	2,233	+11.0%
1910	2,682	+20.1%
1921	2,545	−5.1%

Year	Pop.	±%
1931	2,644	+3.9%
1939	3,008	+13.8%
1950	2,774	−7.8%
1960	3,024	+9.0%
2010	3,190	+5.5%

== Transport ==
Miejska Górka lies on national road 36.

The nearest railway station is in Rawicz.
