= Rawicz County =

Rawicz County Powiat rawicki
- County
- Flag Coat of arms

- Location within the voivodeship
- Coordinates (Rawicz): 51°36′33″N 16°51′27″E
- Country: Poland
- Voivodeship: Greater Poland
- Seat: Rawicz
- Gminas: Total 5: Gmina Bojanowo; Gmina Jutrosin; Gmina Miejska Górka; Gmina Pakosław; Gmina Rawicz

Area
  - Total: 553.23 km^{2} (213.60 sq mi)

Population (2006)
  - Total: 59,375
  - Density: 107.32/km^{2} (277.97/sq mi)
  - Urban: 29,315
  - Rural: 30,060
- Car plates: PRA
- Website: http://www.powiatrawicki.home.pl

Rawicz County (Polish: powiat rawicki) is a unit of territorial administration and local government (powiat) in Greater Poland Voivodeship, west-central Poland. It came into being on January 1, 1999, as a result of the Polish local government reforms passed in 1998. Its administrative seat and largest town is Rawicz, which lies 88 kilometres (55 mi) south of the regional capital Poznań. The county contains three other towns: Miejska Górka, 9 km (6 mi) north-east of Rawicz, Bojanowo, 13 km (8 mi) north-west of Rawicz, and Jutrosin, 22 km (14 mi) east of Rawicz.

The county covers an area of 553.23 square kilometres (213.6 sq mi). As of 2006, its total population was 59,375. Of this number, Rawicz had 21,301 residents; Miejska Górka, 3,128; Bojanowo, 3,014; Jutrosin, 1,872; and the rural population, 30,060.

== Neighbouring counties ==
Rawicz County is bordered by Gostyń County to the north, Krotoszyn County and Milicz County to the east, Trzebnica County to the south, Góra County to the west, and Leszno County to the north-west.

== Administrative divisions ==
The county is subdivided into five gminas (four urban-rural and one rural). These are listed in the following table, in descending order of population.

Gmina	Type	Area (km^{2})	Population (2006)	Seat
Gmina Rawicz	urban-rural	133.6	29,434	Rawicz
Gmina Miejska Górka	urban-rural	103.6	9,283	Miejska Górka
Gmina Bojanowo	urban-rural	123.5	8,938	Bojanowo
Gmina Jutrosin	urban-rural	114.9	7,070	Jutrosin
Gmina Pakosław	rural	77.5	4,650	Pakosław
