= Radęca =

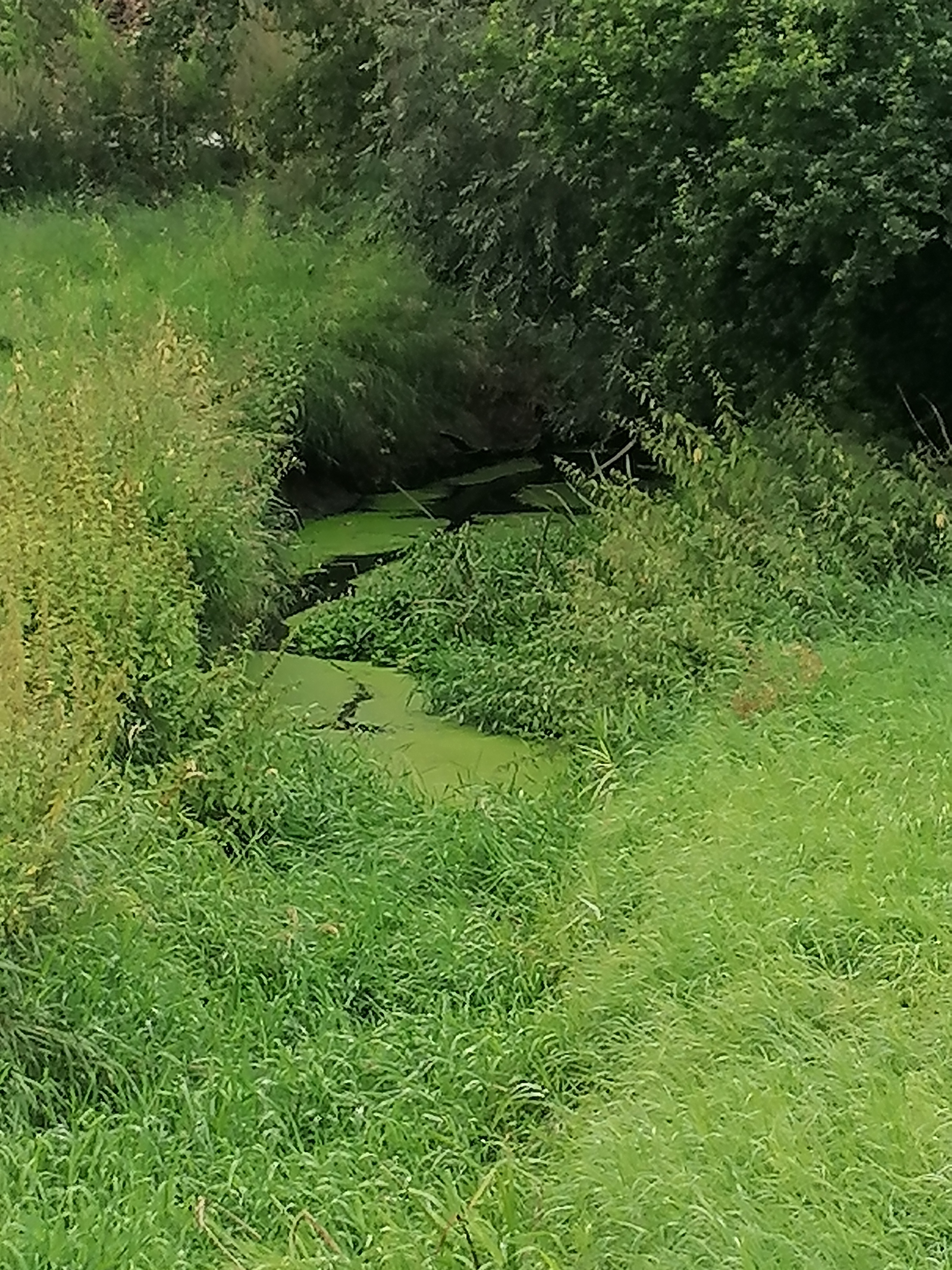
- Radęca in Kobylin

Location
- Country: Poland
- Voivodeship: Greater Poland

Physical characteristics
- Source
  - location: east of Borzęciczki, Krotoszyn County
  - elevation: 131 m (430 ft)
- Mouth: Orla
  - location: Jutrosin, Rawicz County
  - coordinates: 51°39′15″N 17°09′42″E
  - elevation: 96 m (315 ft)
- Length: 29.7 km (18.5 mi)
- Basin size: 183.5 km^{2} (70.8 mi^{2})

Basin features
- Progression: Orla→ Barycz→ Oder→ Baltic Sea

Radęca (or Rdęca) is a river in western Poland, a tributary of the Orla. It meets the Orla at Jutrosin, where it is dammed to create Zbiornik Justrosin (Lake Justrosin) just north of the town and above the confluence.
