= Moult (disambiguation) =

Moulting is the manner in which an animal routinely casts off a part of its body (usually an outer layer or covering).

Moult or Molt may also refer to:

== People ==
- Ailill Molt, (died c. 482 or 484), considered a High King of Ireland and King of Connacht
- Emil Molt (1876–1936), German industrialist, social reformer and anthroposophist
- Hank Molt, American reptile smuggler
- Philippe Le Molt (1895–1976), French painter
- Theodore Frederic Molt (born Johann Friedrich Molt; 1795–1856), German-born Canadian music teacher, composer and organist
- Daniel Moult (born 1973), English organist and educator
- Louis Moult (born 1992), English footballer
- Roger Moult (born 1963), South African cricketer
- Ted Moult (1926–1986), British radio and television personality
- Thomas Moult (1893–1974), English journalist, writer and poet
- Moulton Molt Taylor (1912–1995), American aeronautical engineer and designer of the Aerocar

== Places ==
- Molt, Montana, United States, an unincorporated village
- Moult, Calvados, France, a former commune

== Fictional characters ==
- Molt, a grasshopper in the 1998 animated film A Bug's Life

== See also ==
- MOLT-4, a human cancer cell line
- Moult-Chicheboville, Calvados, France
