= Zielony Dąb =

Zielony Dąb ("green oak") may refer to:

- Zielony Dąb, Greater Poland Voivodeship (west-central Poland)
- Zielony Dąb, Opole Voivodeship (south-west Poland)
