= Fleury-sur-Orne =

- Commune
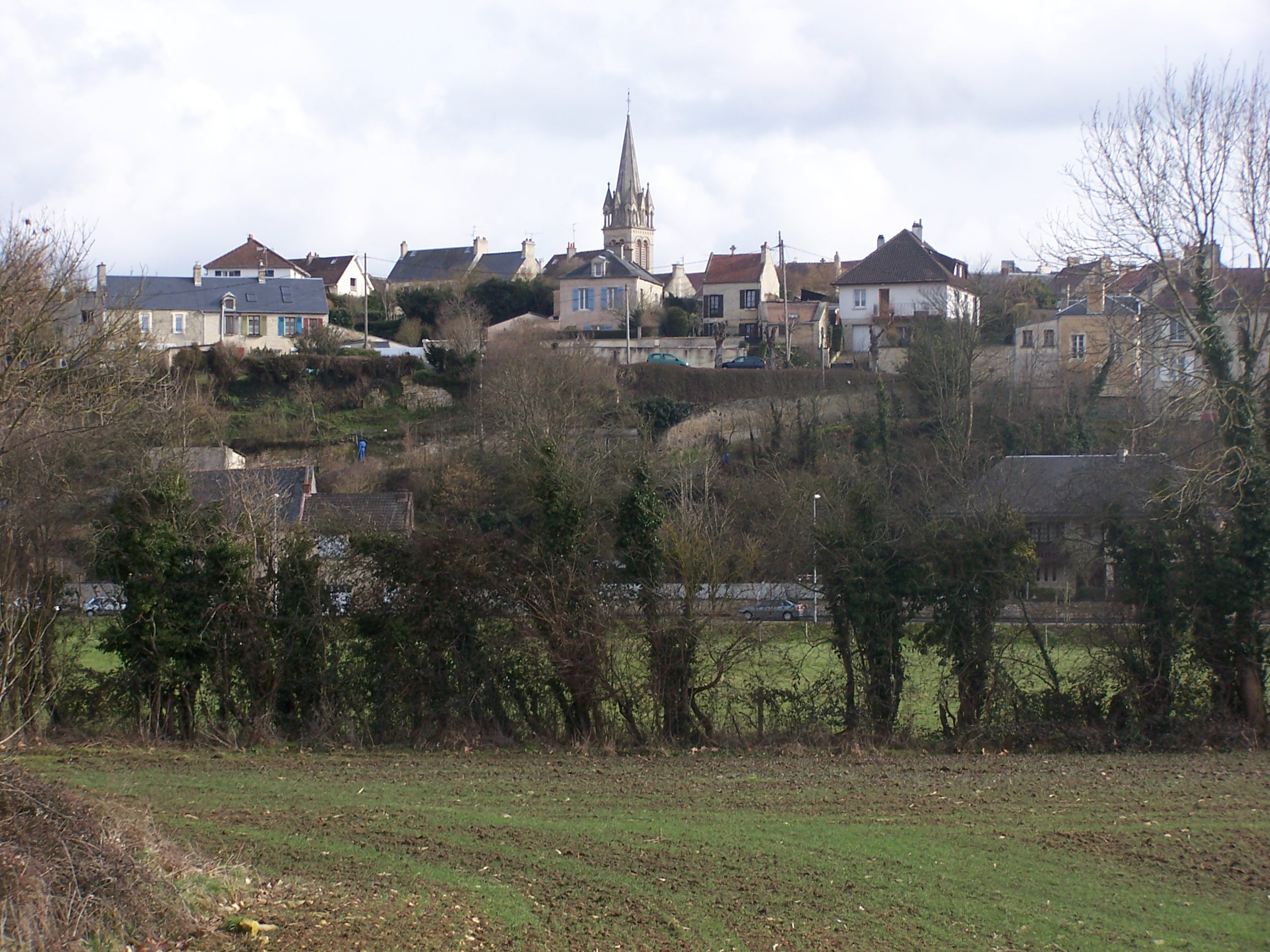
- A general view of Fleury-sur-Orne
- Location of Fleury-sur-Orne
- Location within France Location within Normandy
- Coordinates: 49°08′49″N 0°22′31″W
- Country: France
- Region: Normandy
- Department: Calvados
- Arrondissement: Caen
- Canton: Caen-5
- Intercommunality: Caen la Mer

Government
  - Mayor (2020–2026): Marc Lecerf (DVG)
- Area^{1}: 6.75 km^{2} (2.61 sq mi)
- Highest elevation: 66 m (217 ft)
- Lowest elevation: 2 m (6.6 ft)
- Population (2023): 5,941
  - Density: 880/km^{2} (2,280/sq mi)
- Time zone: UTC+01:00 (CET)
  - Summer (DST): UTC+02:00 (CEST)
- INSEE/Postal code: 14271 /14123
- ^{1} French Land Register data, which excludes lakes, ponds, glaciers > 1 km^{2} (0.386 sq mi or 247 acres) and river estuaries.

Fleury-sur-Orne (French pronunciation: [flœʁi syʁ ɔʁn], literally Fleury on Orne) is a commune in the Calvados department in the Normandy region in northwestern France. It is part of the Communauté urbaine Caen la Mer and of the agglomeration of Caen.

== Geography ==
The river Orne is the only watercourse to flow through the commune.

== History ==
Until 1916 Fleury-sur-Orne was known as Allemagne (Calvados) after the Alamanni tribe which once guarded the ford across the Orne. During the First World War this name, meaning in French Germany, became inconvenient and embarrassing for the inhabitants (unlike those of Allemagne-en-Provence in Southern France). The town council therefore decided on 23 August 1916, to change the name and to call it Fleury-sur-Orne in memory of the commune of Fleury-devant-Douaumont, a commune of the Meuse (in 1914: 422 inhabitants, school, church, town hall, 13 tradesmen, 10 landholding farmers), which was destroyed in 1916.

=== Massacre of the Athis fort ===
In 1047, Duke William of Normandy (later William the Conqueror), helped by Henry I, king of France, put an end to a revolt of Norman barons at the Battle of Val-ès-Dunes, close to the villages of Chicheboville, Secqueville, Vimont and Bourguébus. Little is known about this battle, but it seems to have been a purely cavalry contest, with neither infantry nor archers playing a significant role.

After a series of disorderly cavalry skirmishes, the rebellious barons fled. They were slaughtered as they tried to cross the Orne, at the Athis ford close to Fleury-sur-Orne. Carried downstream en masse, the bodies of the massacred knights blocked the mill of Barbillon on the level of current Ile Enchantée.

The victory allowed William to remain Duke of Normandy, setting the stage for his later military campaigns and statecraft.

== Population ==
Historical population
Year	Pop.	±% p.a.
1968	2,817	—
1975	2,861	+0.22%
1982	3,650	+3.54%
1990	3,861	+0.70%
1999	4,231	+1.02%
2007	4,014	−0.66%
2012	4,299	+1.38%
2017	4,915	+2.71%
2023	5,941	+3.21%
Source: INSEE

== Points of Interest ==
=== National heritage sites ===
The commune has two sites listed as a Monument historique.

- Église Notre-Dame d'Allemagne-la-Basse - an eleventh century church registered as a monument in 1913.
- house - a private dwelling built in 1717 registered as a monument in 2009.

== Personalities ==
- Nicole Oresme (1325 – 1382), also known as Nicolas Oresme, Nicholas Oresme, or Nicolas d'Oresme, a philosopher of the later Middle Ages, was born here.

== Twin towns – sister cities ==
Fleury-sur-Orne is twinned with:

- (Senegal) Ouonck, senegal. Since 1992
- Waldbüttelbrunn, Germany. Since 1994
- Karpoš, North Macedonia. Since 2012
- Mar del Plata, Argentina. Since 2016

== See also ==
- Communes of the Calvados department
