= Halin =

Halin may refer to:

- Halin, Poland
- Halin, Sool
- Hanlin, Burma
