= Rauenberg =

Rauenberg may refer to:

- Rauenberg, Kraichgau, Baden-Württemberg, Germany
- Rauenberg (Freudenstadt), Germany
- Rauenberg (Berlin), Germany
