= Ecdysis (disambiguation) =

Ecdysis is the moulting of the exoskeleton in arthropods and other animals.

Ecdysis may also refer to:

- Ecdysis (album), an album by Miho Hatori
- "Ecdysis", a 2025 song by Deftones from private music

== See also ==
- Ecdysiast, a euphemism for a striptease artist
- Moult (disambiguation)
