= Jutrosin =

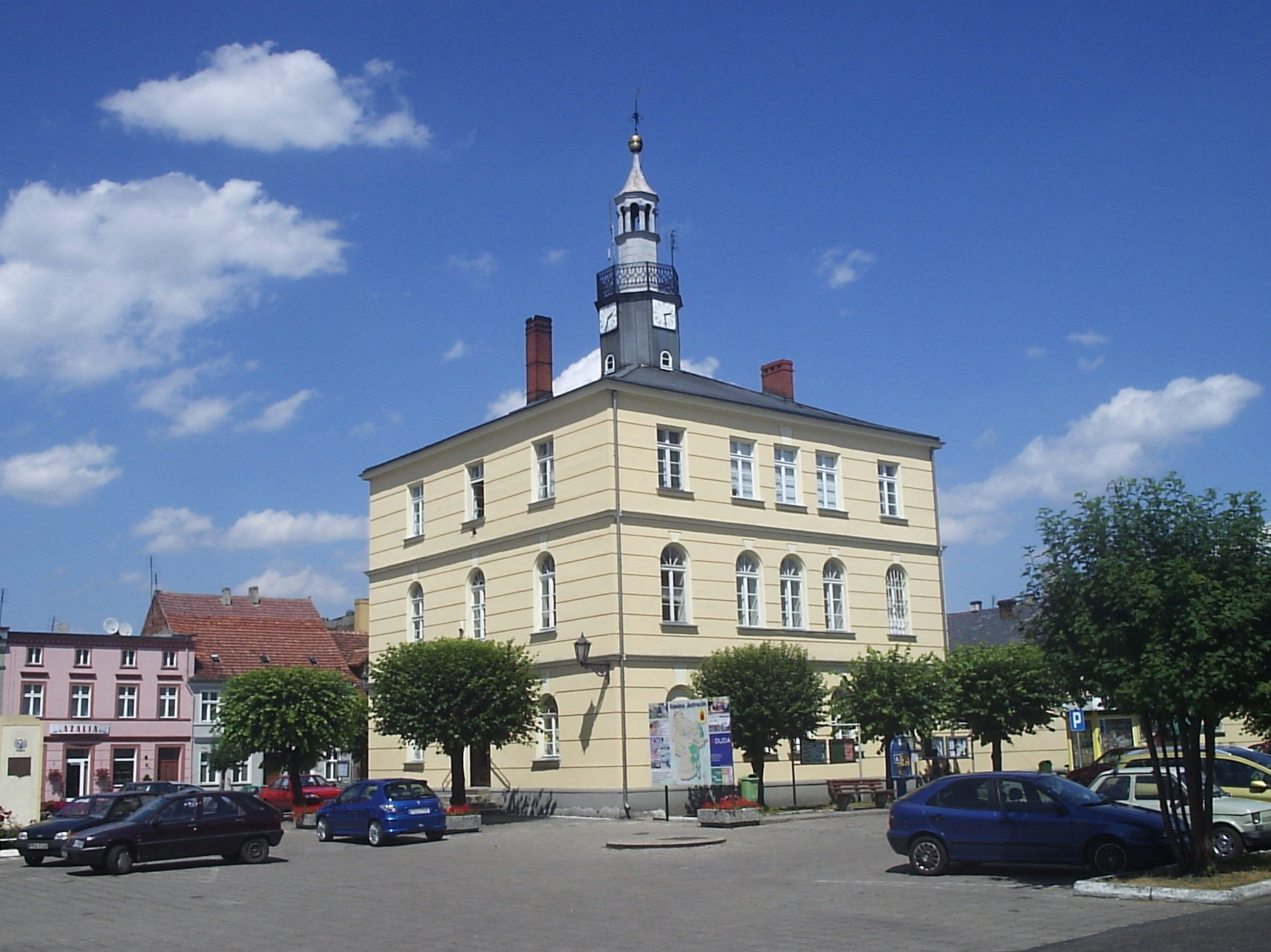
- Town hall

- Coat of arms

- Location within Poland
- Coordinates: 51°38′50″N 17°10′10″E
- Country: Poland
- Voivodeship: Greater Poland
- County: Rawicz
- Gmina: Jutrosin

Area
  - Total: 1.62 km^{2} (0.63 sq mi)

Population (2014)
  - Total: 1,947
  - Density: 1,200/km^{2} (3,110/sq mi)
- Time zone: UTC+1 (CET)
  - Summer (DST): UTC+2 (CEST)
- Postal code: 63-930
- Vehicle registration: PRA
- Website: http://jutrosin.eu/

Jutrosin (pronounced [jutˈrɔɕin]) is a town in Rawicz County, Greater Poland Voivodeship, Poland, with 1,947 inhabitants (2014). The rivers Orla and Radęca converge near the town.

== History ==
Jutrosin received town privileges in 1534.

Jutrosin was a private town administratively located in the Pyzdry County in the Kalisz Voivodeship in the Greater Poland Province of the Kingdom of Poland.

During the German occupation of Poland (World War II), a branch of the Nazi prison in Rawicz was based in Jutrosin.

== Demographics ==
Historical population

| Year | Pop. | ±% |
|---|---|---|
| 1843 | 1,793 | — |
| 1871 | 1,977 | +10.3% |
| 1880 | 1,976 | −0.1% |
| 1890 | 1,855 | −6.1% |
| 1900 | 1,906 | +2.7% |
| 1910 | 1,804 | −5.4% |

| Year | Pop. | ±% |
|---|---|---|
| 1921 | 1,725 | −4.4% |
| 1931 | 1,677 | −2.8% |
| 1939 | 1,731 | +3.2% |
| 1950 | 1,390 | −19.7% |
| 1960 | 1,367 | −1.7% |
| 2010 | 1,906 | +39.4% |

== Gallery ==
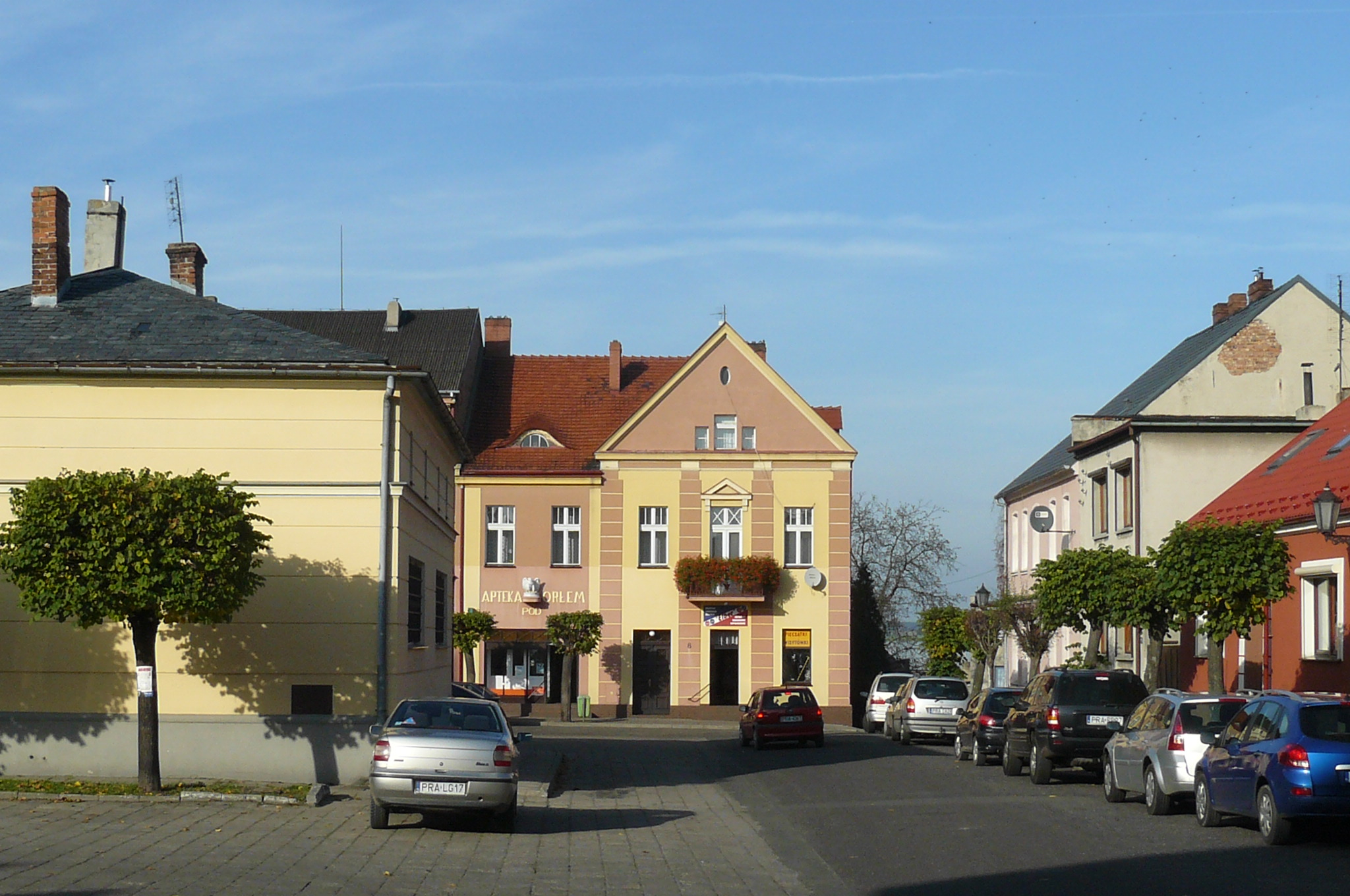
Centre of town

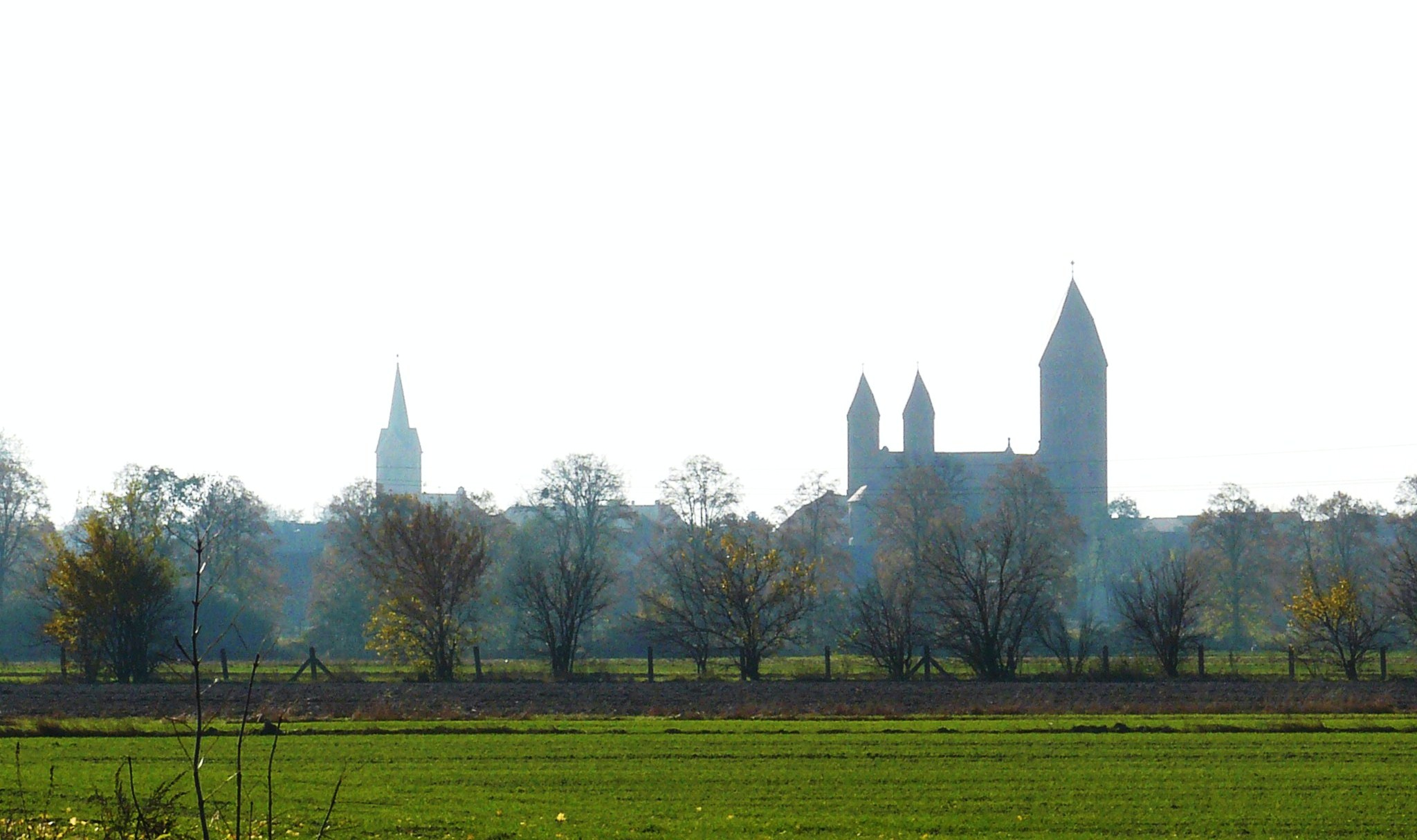
Panorama

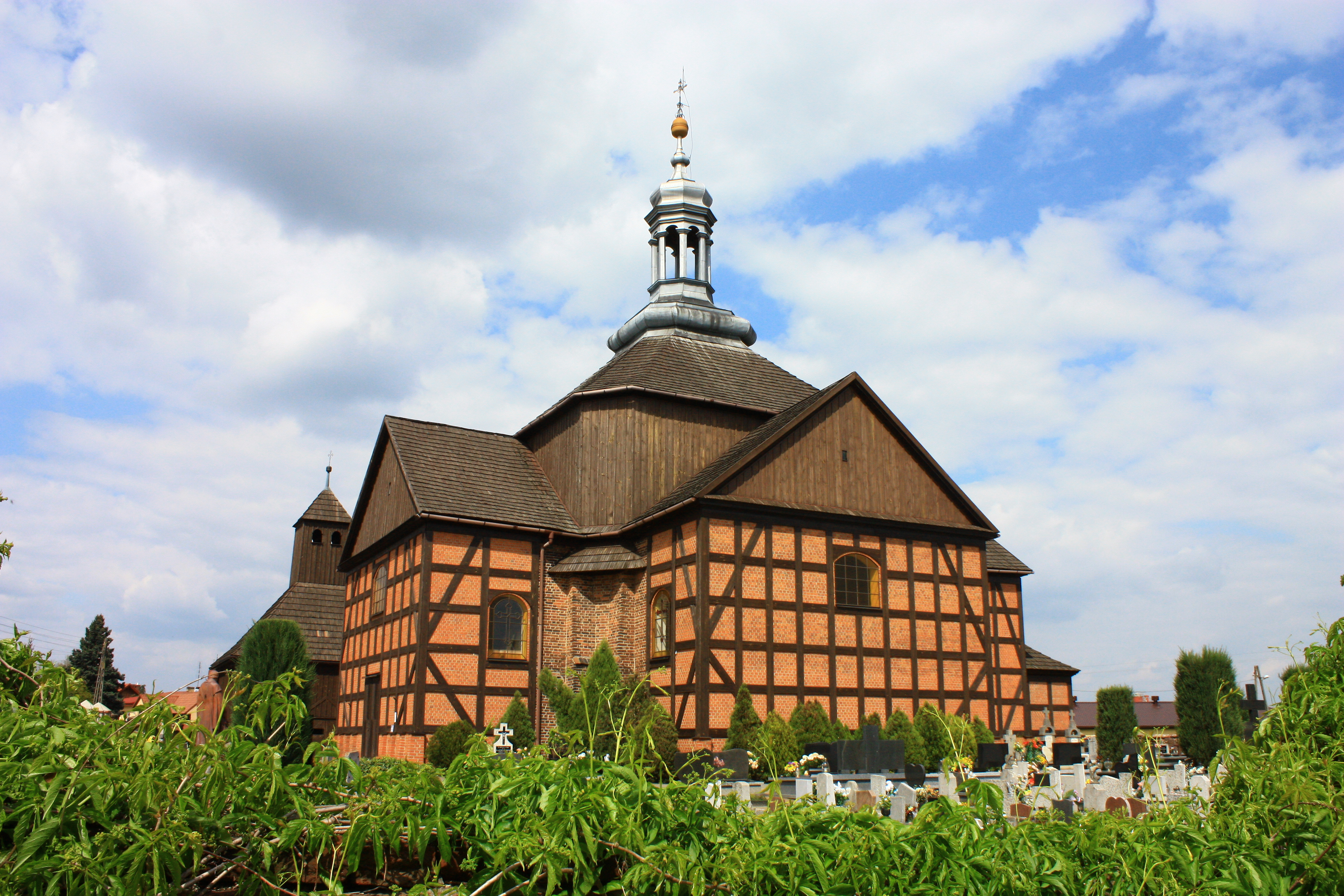
The Holy Cross Church

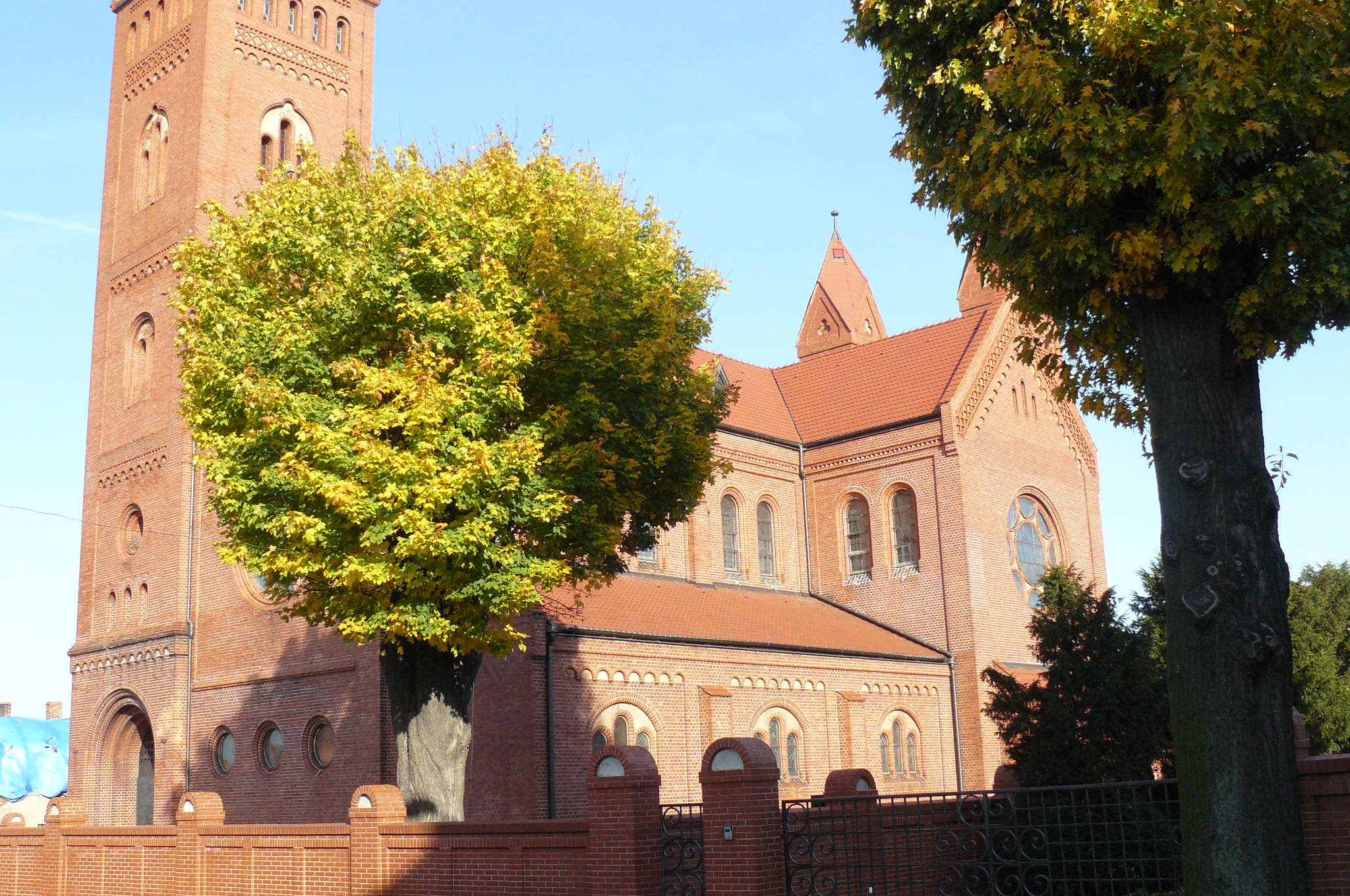
Church of St Elizabeth

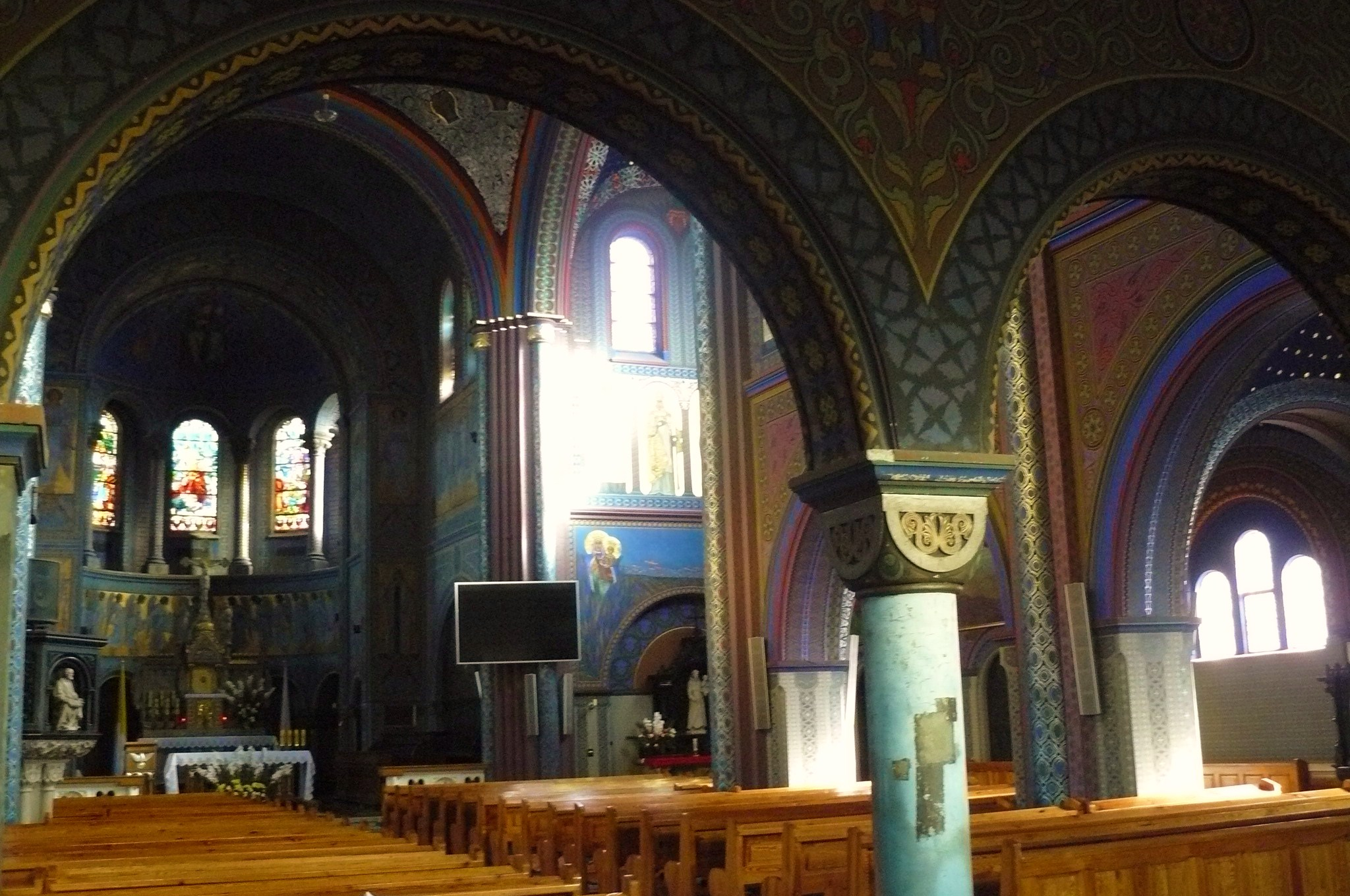
Church of St Elizabeth, Interior

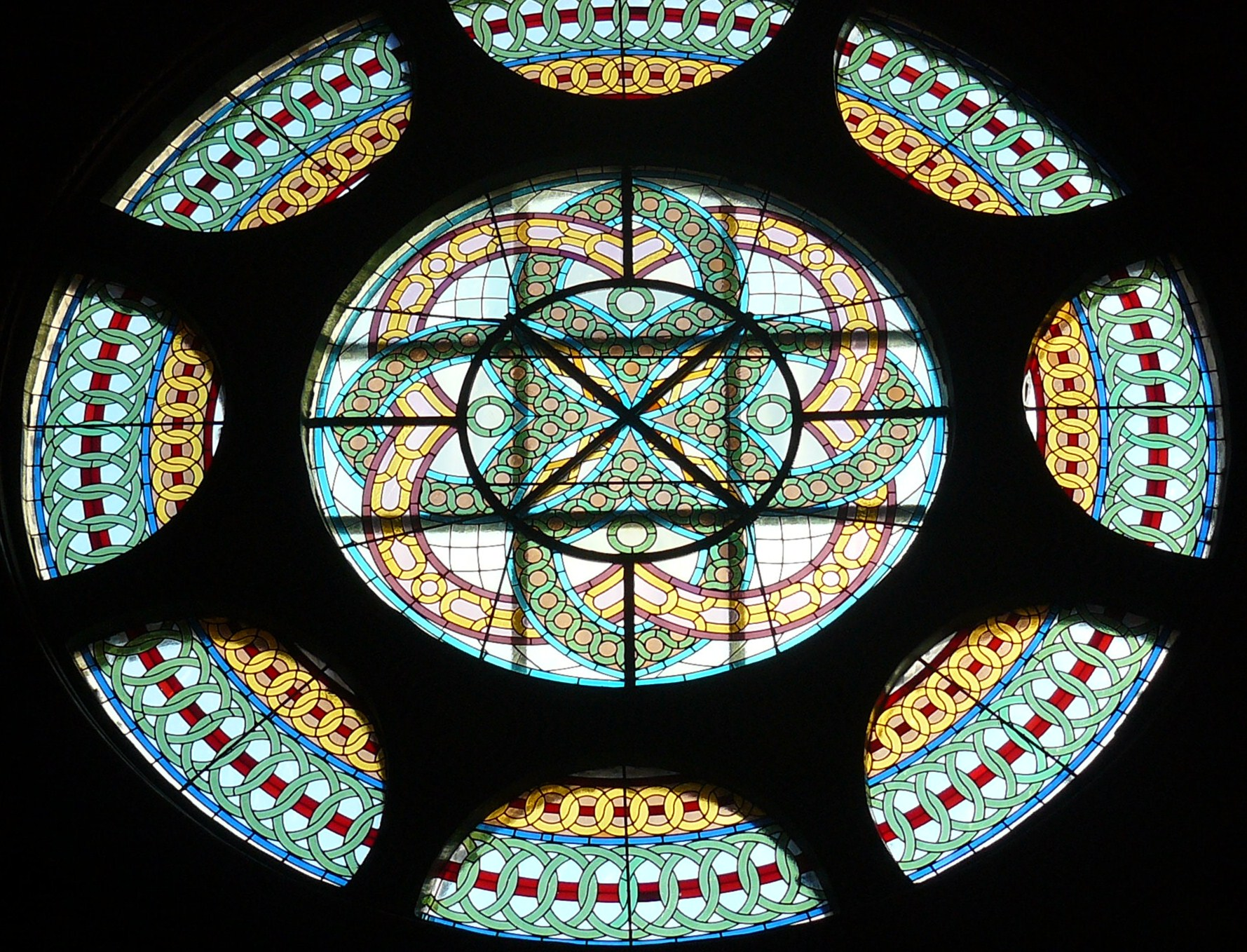
Church of St Elizabeth, stained glass by Józef Mehoffer

== Notable residents ==
- Edmund Elend (1881–1933), merchant and department store owner
- Michael Friedländer (1833–1910), Orientalist
- Krystyna Łybacka (1946–2020), politician
- Alfred Trzebinski (1902–1946), SS-physician at the Auschwitz, Majdanek and Neuengamme concentration camps executed for war crimes

== Twin towns – sister cities ==
Jutrosin is twinned with:

- (France) - Potigny since 1993.
