= Niewczyk family (luthiers) =

Polish family of luthiers

Niewczyk
- Family business
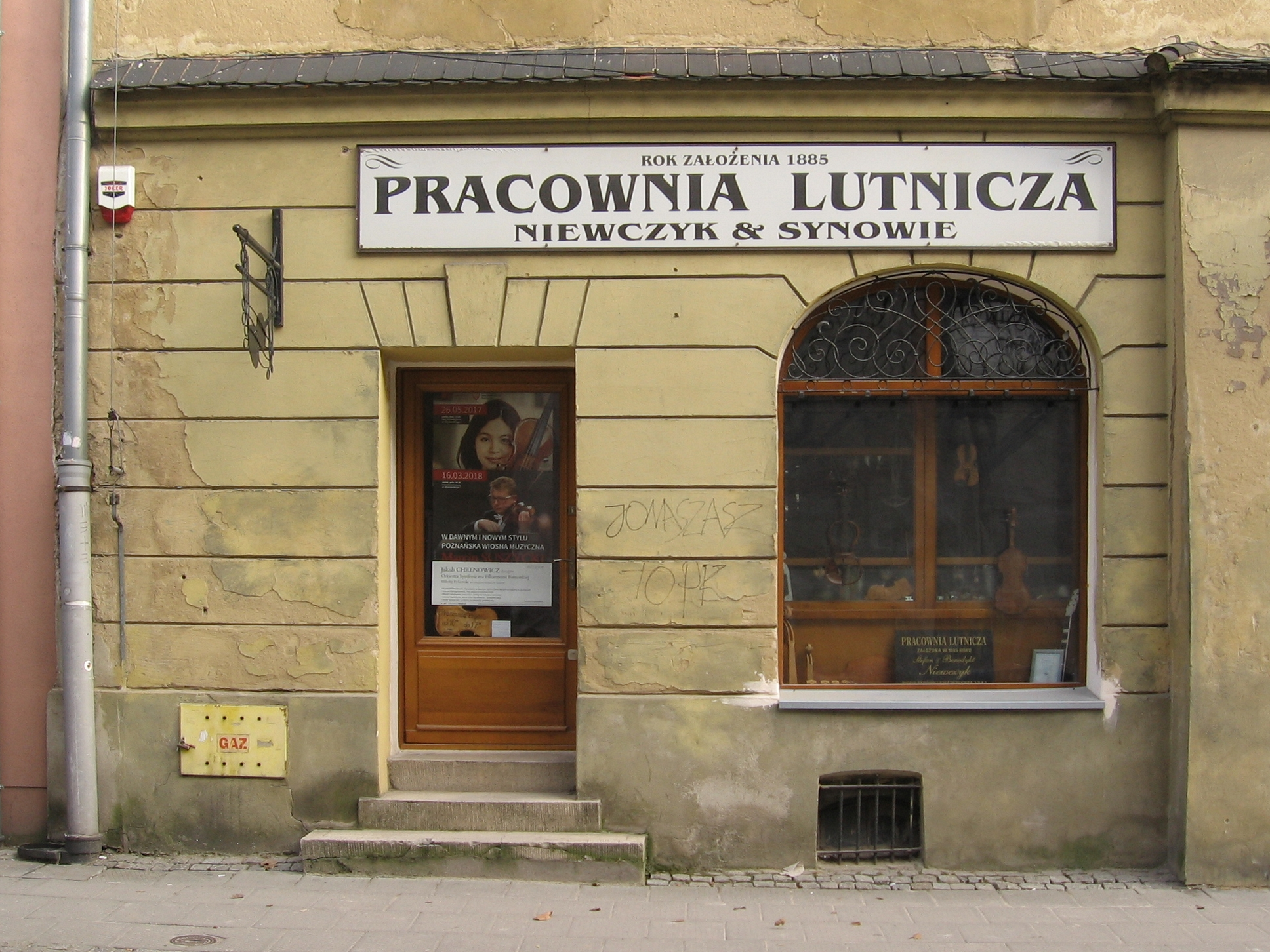
- Niewczyk family luthier workshop in Poznań
- Country: Poland
- Current region: Poznań
- Traditions: Luthier

The Niewczyk family is a dynasty of instrument makers who operated in Lviv and Bydgoszcz. The family workshop Pracownia Lutnicza Niewczyk & Synowie is still operating in Poznań as of 2025.

== Niewczyk family members ==
=== Franciszek Niewczyk (1859 – 1944) ===
Franciszek Niewczyk was born on 4 September 1859 in Sowy, 100 kilometres (62 mi) south of Poznań. His mother was Marianna née Berlińska; his father, Ignacy, was himself a wedding musician. Franciszek was a precision locksmith by trade. He inherited his passion for music from his father, with whom he played the clarinet at parties.

During his military service in the Prussian army, Franciszek worked in an orchestra and transported instruments for repair to Berlin and Zgorzelec (then Görlitz). In Zgorzelec, he met German luthier Heinrich Lange, from whom he gained his first professional knowledge. In 1885, he founded a violin-making workshop in Poznań called Pracownia Lutnicza Niewczyk & Synowie (Niewczyk & Sons Violin Workshop). Initially, he repaired only wind instruments, but over time, he employed retired specialists from Lange's workshop and expanded his skills to include string instruments and Plucked string instruments.

Franciszek participated in the patriotic effort to erect a monument to the Battle of Grunwald in Kraków, eventually unveiled on 15 July 1910. He participated in meetings in this city, transporting money collected by Poles from the Prussian partition towards the Austrian Partition.

Arrested, he was expelled in 1905 from his own company and ordered in 1907 by the Prussian authorities to leave the city within 24 hours. As a consequence, thanks to Count Turno's intercession, they found refuge in the Chorążyzna region of Lwów. There, in 1907 he founded a musical instrument factory on Grodecka Street. It was the first of its kind in today's capital of Ukraine, producing, among other things, high-quality violins. He won gold medals for his instruments in 1908 in Paris and Karlovy Vary.

In 1885, Franciszek had married Aniela Szczepańska (1854 – 1895). The couple had 7 children: Jadwiga, Michalina, Stanisław, Franciszka, Marianna, Józefa, and Roman (who died in infancy).

Following the Russian invasion of Lviv in 1939, the factory, then managed by his daughter Michalina, closed in 1945. Franciszek Niewczyk died in Lviv in 1944. He was buried at the Lychakiv Cemetery.

=== Stanisław Niewczyk (1890 – 1969) ===
Stanisław Niewczyk was born on 27 August 1890 in Poznań. He passed his Journeyman's exam in Lviv, where the family had to flee to in 1905. Stanisław then worked at his father's company until 1922. He participated in the battle of Lviv in 1918 – 1919.

In 1922, he moved to Bydgoszcz, where a branch of the Lviv instrument factory opened: he used to build and sell string instruments, shipping finished mandolins and guitars in crates to Lviv and receiving from there wind instruments.

In 1925, he passed his master's exam in Poznań. He directed the Bydgoszcz instrument factory from 1922 to 1935, owning a workshop on 147 Gdańska street (present day Nr. 46), which moved in the early 1930s to 2 Sniadeckich street. Stanisław lived in a nearby flat at today's 44 Gdańsk Street. From 1935 on, he also ran a luthier's workshop in Poznań, where he settled permanently in 1938.

At the beginning of World War II, Stanisław volunteered for Polish Army. Upon returning from the September Campaign, he was arrested by the Gestapo and refused to register for the Volksliste. As a result, he lost his apartment and his workshop in the city center: he had to transfer to the outskirts of the city. He was imprisoned for seven weeks by the local Gestapo for his underground activities.

Stanisław Niewczyk was considered one of the most outstanding Polish luthiers. His workshop produced all range of instruments:

- Brass and woodwind instruments.
- Serbian Plucked string instrument.
- Designed based on instruments.
- Guitars, mandolins, balalaikas.

The workshop's niche was bowed string instruments, and more especially, violins. Niewczyk's atelier also repaired and adjusted all musical instruments (e.g., piano tuning). Stanisław Niewczyk received a silver medal for his work at the Polish General Exhibition (Powszechna Wystawa Krajowa) in Poznań in 1929. The workshop was also awarded a gold medal at the Poznań International Fair (Międzynarodowe Targi Poznańskie) in 1949 and 1950. A violin from 1928, built in the atelier, was exhibited at the National Museum in Poznań in 1949. During the 1952 Violin in Poland exhibition, Stanisław showed two of his violins from 1933 and 1952.

He was also active in the community, serving as a long-time Guild Elder in Poznań, chairing the Examination Committee for master violin makers, or co-initiating the establishment of the Association of Polish Artist Violin Makers (Związek Polskich Artystów Lutników) in 1954.

Furthermore, he also taught violin making: approximately 12 journeymen completed their apprenticeships in his Bydgoszcz workshop, while he educated in this trade his sons Jan Marian (born 1924) and Stefan (born 1925), together with his grandson, Benedykt, Stefan's son.

Stanisław Niewczyk died on 26 July 1969, in Poznań. He was buried at the Górczyński Cemetery in the same city (location IIP-26-34).

=== Stefan Niewczyk (1925–2007) ===
Stefan Niewczyk, Stanisław's son, was born on 7 August 1925 in Bydgoszcz. At the time, his father was heading the local branch of the Pracownia Lutnicza Niewczyk & Synowie in the city. Stefan had two brothers: Antoni (who served in the Home Army's S7 network during WWII) and Marian. He learned to play the violin at the age of six in June 1939 (aged 14), Stefan started learning violin-making with his father: he built his first violin in 1940.

During the Second World War, he learned to play the piano and helped his father to hide the banner of the Guild of Musical Instrument Makers in the workshop. They handed it back at the end of the conflict.

As a musician, Stefan Niewczyk first collaborated with the Symphony Orchestra of the State Forests Directorate (Dyrekcja lasów państwowych) and later with the Orchestra of the Financial Office.

He passed his journeyman's title diploma in 1945; three years later, he received his master's degree in violin-making (1948) and then his master's degree in wind instrument and accordion making. He made around 200 violins during his career, as well as illegal electric guitars. Stefan Niewczyk was a respected expert known throughout Poland. In 1954, he was one of the co-founders of the Association of Polish Artist Violin Makers (Związek Polskich Artystów Lutników). He also won an honorable mention at the 1st International Violin Making Competition in Warsaw in 1956.

In his workshop in Poznań, he worked in particular on the violins of musicians competing in all post-war Henryk Wieniawski Violin Competitions, occurring every five years in the city. In the 1970s, the renowned musicologist Jerzy Waldorff denounced in the weekly paper Polityka the scandalous working conditions of the Niewczyk family, accusing the city authorities of negligence. Thanks to his intervention, the violin-making workshop was relocated to 6 Woźna Street in 1978, where it still stands today. In 1983, the luthier's atelier built an instrument designed by Jan AP Kaczmarek, called the Niewkacz, from Niew(czyk)Kacz(marek).

Stefan Niewczyk died on 11 March 2007, in Poznań. He was buried at the Smochowice Cemetery located on Lubowska Street.

=== Benedykt Niewczyk ===
Benedykt, Stefan's son, was born in 1960 in Poznań. He studied physics at Adam Mickiewicz University, specializing in acoustics. He also worked as an assistant at the Royal Technical University of Stockholm. Since 2005, he has taken over the family workshop.

In 2025, Benedykt received the Meritorious for the City of Poznań from the hands of the chairman of the Poznań City Council, Grzegorz Ganowicz. In October the same year, he celebrated the 140th anniversary of the luthier's atelier. As a court expert and award-winning craftsman, he has gained international recognition.

The company knows the fifth generation of the Niewczyk family, as Benedykt's sons, Tytus and Maksym, also acquired their violin-making qualifications. His son, Maksym, competed in the International Luthiers' Competition in Poznań (Międzynarodowy Konkurs Lutniczy im. Henryka Wieniawskiego).

== See also ==
- List of Polish people
- Grunwald Monument

== Bibliography ==
- Pruss, Zdzisław; Weber, Alicja; Kuczma, Rajmund (2004). Bydgoski leksykon muzyczny (in Polish). Bydgoszcz: Kujawsko-Pomorskie Towarzystwo Kulturalne. p. 394.
