= Edmund Elend =

German merchant

Edmund Elend (11 March 1881 in Jutrosin, Kreis Rawitsch, Province of Posen – 13 January 1933 in Tempelhof) was a German merchant and department store owner.

== Life ==
Edmund Elend was born into a Jewish family on 11 March 1881 in Jutrosin in the Rawitsch district in the province of Posen (now Jutrosin in the Wielkopolska voivodeship in Poland). His father was the merchant Louis Elend (c. 1844–1927) and his mother Philippine née Samuelis (c. 1846–1912). He had at least five siblings, they were Philipp Elend (who had his family name changed to Elden in 1920, 1870–1939), Jette Elend (1871-1934), Hulda Elend (1874-1939), Adeline Elend (1876-1913) and Hedwig Elend (1883-1976).

On 27 April 1911, he married his fiancée Clara Engländer (1884-1949) in Posen. Their first child together, son Hermann, was born in Tempelhof in 1912. In 1914, daughter Käthe Hanna was also born there, and in 1920 daughter Lotte.

On 13 January 1933, Edmund Elend died by suicide, shooting himself in the rooms of his Kaufhaus Tempelhof at the age of only 51.

Clara Elend then went to Switzerland, emigrating from Geneva via Trieste to Haifa in the Mandatory Palestine in mid-April 1935. Clara died on 27 October 1949 in Haifa, Israel.

== Kaufhaus Tempelhof ==
Edmund Elend founded the Kaufhaus Tempelhof GmbH in Berlin in 1907 and it can be proven that he operated his first shop, the Kaufhaus Tempelhof at Berliner Straße 74 in Tempelhof, from 1908. This was located on the ground floor of a residential building on the corner of Friedrich-Wilhelm-Straße.

In 1913, he had his own department stores' built at Berliner Straße 126 on the corner of Kaiserin-Augusta-Straße. The architect was Siegfried Weile; alterations and a new building on Kaiserin-Augusta-Straße in 1926 were carried out by Adolf Sommerfeld. Siegfried Weile (1885-1942) was the son of the master mason Samuel Weile. He ran a construction company in Berlin-Charlottenburg as an architect and government builder and fled to Belgium in 1939, from where he was deported to the Auschwitz concentration camp in 1942 where it is presumed he was murdered.

The Kaufhaus Tempelhof occupied a very prominent position in the district of the same name (at that time a suburb of Berlin until 1920), there was nothing comparable nearby, even though it could of course not be compared with the large Tietz or Wertheim department stores in the centre of Berlin.

On 20 April 1930 there was an article in the Vorwärts reporting on the dismissal of employees who wanted to prepare the election of a works council. The dismissals had to be withdrawn.

In August 1931 at the latest, the Kaufhaus Tempelhof ran into economic difficulties and had to file for bankruptcy. On 9 October 1931, it was again reported in the Vorwärts that all employees had been dismissed. Whether this bankruptcy had only to do with the economic crisis at the beginning of the 1930s, or also the increasing anti-Semitism due to Nazism and the election successes of the NSDAP, is not known, but very conceivable.

== Aryanisation ==
After 1933, the Kaufhaus Tempelhof was aryanised. As early as 1934, the „Sera“ Kleinpreis-Kaufhaus GmbH was located in its place on the property as a tenant, and later also as the owner. There are contemporary picture postcards and advertising postcards with this name and the image of the department store.

In 1934 the stately home built by Edmund Elend in 1926 at Albrechtstraße 118-121 went into receivership after his death and changed hands in 1937 under unknown conditions; the new owner Wilhelmine Meyer was most likely "Aryan". In 1934, Wilhelm Meyer, who ran the book printing firm Rotadruck Wilhelm Meyer K.G. at Alexandrinenstraße 110, was a tenant at Berliner Straße 126, as was Clara Elend. The house was most likely destroyed by an Allied air raid during the World War II and no claim for reparation was filed for it after 1945.

For the property of the Kaufhaus Tempelhof at Berliner Straße 126 on the corner of Kaiserin-Augusta-Straße 6-7 and the property with a residential building at Attilastraße 179, the JRSO filed claims for reparation in 1951; the outcome of the claims is unknown.

== Kaufhaus Tempelhof after 1945 ==
After the end of the war, the Kaufhaus Tempelhof operated under the name Kaufhaus Walden from 1950 until the beginning of 1967, the owner was the merchant Carl Walden. What connection he had with „Sera“ Kaufhaus GmbH, i.e. how he came to own the department store, is unknown. Carl Walden was a well-known footballer before the war, after the second world war he was 1st chairman in BFC Preußen and died in 1964 or 1965.

In 1967, Karstadt took over the "Kaufhaus Walden". In January 1978, the Berliner Tagesspiegel reported that Karstadt wanted to demolish the department store on the corner of Kaiserin-Augusta-Straße and Tempelhofer Damm in order to build a new building complete with multi-storey car park.

The Kaufhaus tempelhof was demolished, rebuilt and extended by Karstadt in the early 1980s. The façade of the former Tempelhof department store was rebuilt in a historicist style as a requirement of the authority for the protection of historical monuments.

In 2014, there were fears that Karstadt would close the location. Most recently, the Tempelhof site was again on Karstadt's list of locations to be closed in 2020, but was exempted from closure (at least for a period of five years) due to protests and further assurances by the government of Berlin.

== Honours ==
In the district of Bezirk Tempelhof-Schöneberg or the local district of Tempelhof, neither the life and work of Edmund Elend nor his family are remembered or commemorated today. His grave or that of his deceased relatives may still exist at the Weißensee cemetery, the largest preserved Jewish cemetery in Berlin.

Edmund Elend is listed in the Memorial Book – Victims of the Persecution of Jews under the Nazi Regime in Germany (1933-1945) of the German Federal Archives.
