= Gmina Pakosław =

Gmina Pakosław Pakosław Commune
- Gmina
- Coat of arms

- Coordinates (Pakosław): 51°37′N 17°3′E
- Country: Poland
- Voivodeship: Greater Poland
- County: Rawicz
- Seat: Pakosław

Area
  - Total: 77.54 km^{2} (29.94 sq mi)

Population (2006)
  - Total: 4,650
  - Density: 60.0/km^{2} (155/sq mi)
- Website: https://www.pakoslaw.pl/

Gmina Pakosław is a rural gmina (administrative district) in Rawicz County, Greater Poland Voivodeship, in west-central Poland. Its seat is the village of Pakosław, which lies approximately 14 kilometres (9 mi) east of Rawicz and 88 km (55 mi) south of the regional capital Poznań.

The gmina covers an area of 77.54 square kilometres (29.9 sq mi). As of 2006, its total population was 4,650.

== Villages ==
Gmina Pakosław contains the villages and settlements of Białykał, Chojno, Dębionka, Golejewko, Golejewo, Góreczki Wielkie, Halin, Kubeczki, Niedźwiadki, Osiek, Ostrobudki, Pakosław, Podborowo, Pomocno, Skrzyptowo, Sowy, Sworowo, Zaorle and Zielony Dąb.

== Neighbouring gminas ==
Gmina Pakosław is bordered by the gminas of Jutrosin, Miejska Górka, Milicz and Rawicz.
