= Osiek, Rawicz County =

Osiek
- Village
- Location within Poland
- Coordinates: 51°37′N 17°6′E
- Country: Poland
- Voivodeship: Greater Poland
- County: Rawicz
- Gmina: Pakosław

Osiek [ˈɔɕɛk] is a village in the administrative district of Gmina Pakosław, within Rawicz County, Greater Poland Voivodeship, in west-central Poland.
