= Ostrobudki =

- Village
- Location within Poland
- Coordinates: 51°38′N 17°2′E
- Country: Poland
- Voivodeship: Greater Poland
- County: Rawicz
- Gmina: Pakosław
- Population: 153

Ostrobudki [ɔstrɔˈbutki] is a village in the administrative district of Gmina Pakosław, within Rawicz County, Greater Poland Voivodeship, in west-central Poland.
