= Tempelhof =

- Quarter of Berlin
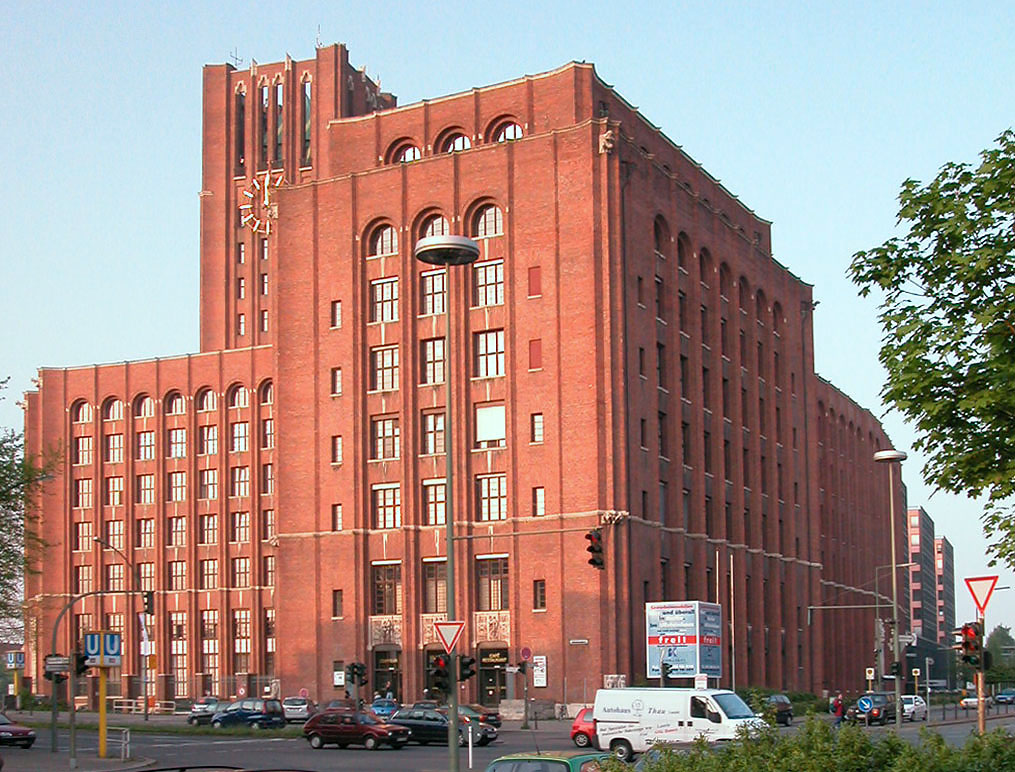
- Ullsteinhaus

- Coat of arms

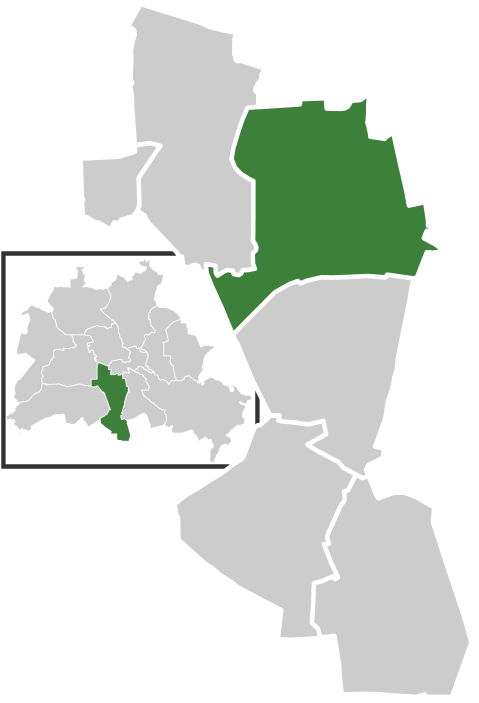
- Location of Tempelhof in Tempelhof-Schöneberg and Berlin
- Interactive map of Tempelhof
- Location within Germany Location within Berlin
- Coordinates: 52°28′00″N 13°23′00″E
- Country: Germany
- State: Berlin
- City: Berlin
- Borough: Tempelhof-Schöneberg
- Founded: 1210

Area
  - Total: 12.2 km^{2} (4.7 sq mi)
- Elevation: 50 m (160 ft)

Population (2024-12-31)
  - Total: 63,580
  - Density: 5,210/km^{2} (13,500/sq mi)
- Time zone: UTC+01:00 (CET)
  - Summer (DST): UTC+02:00 (CEST)
- Postal codes: 12101, 12103, 12105, 12109, 12099, 12279
- Vehicle registration: B

Tempelhof (German: [ˈtɛmpl̩hoːf]) is a locality of Berlin within the borough of Tempelhof-Schöneberg. It is the location of the former Tempelhof Airport, one of the earliest commercial airports in the world. The former airport and surroundings are now a park called Tempelhofer Feld, making it the largest inner city open space in the world.

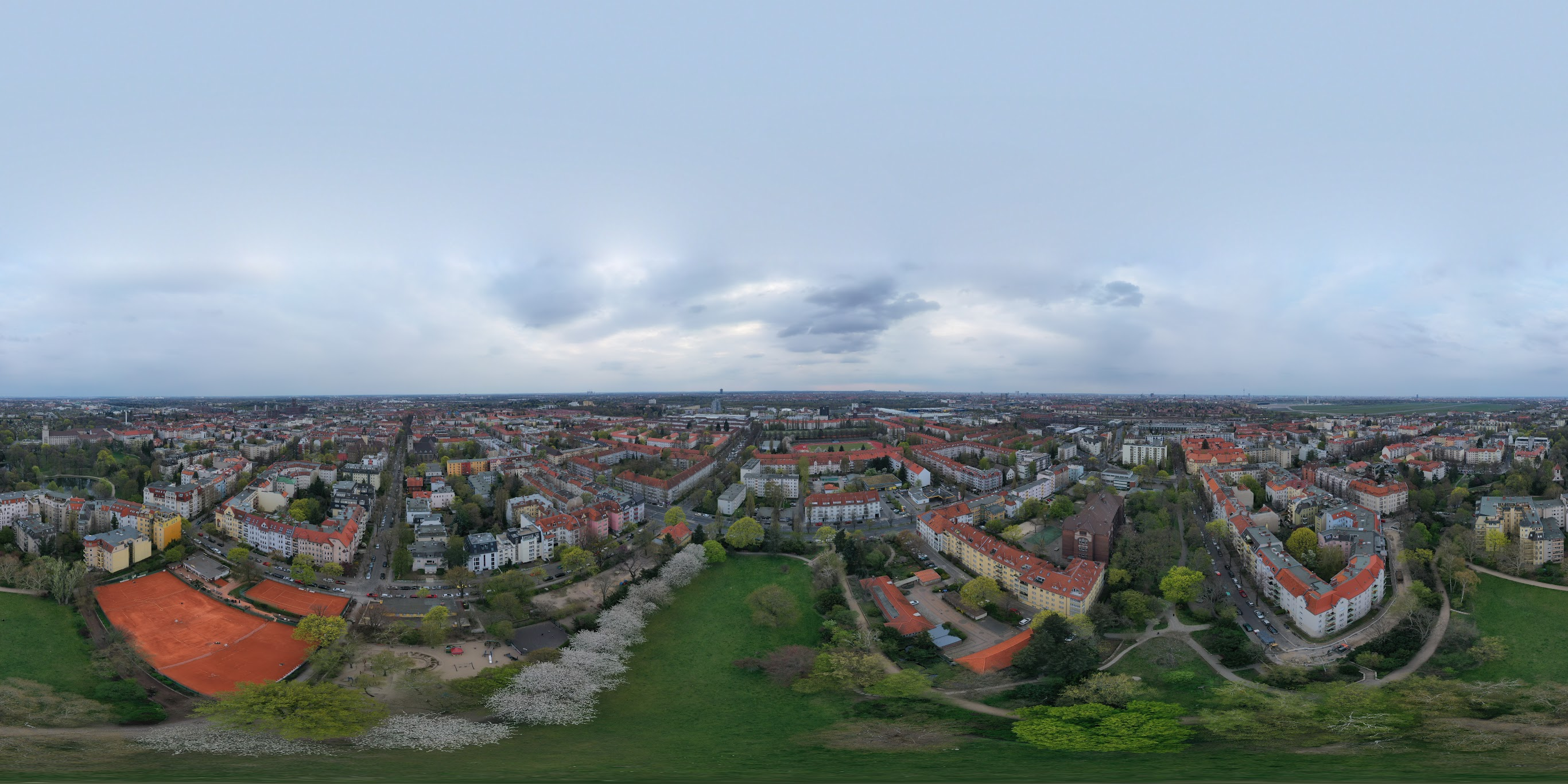
360° aerial photograph of the old part of Tempelhof (view as a 360° interactive panorama)

The Tempelhof locality is located in the south-central part of the city. Before Berlin's 2001 administrative reform, the area of Tempelhof, together with the localities of Mariendorf, Marienfelde, and Lichtenrade, constituted a borough of its own, also called Tempelhof. These localities grew from historic villages on the Teltow plateau founded in the early 13th century in the course of the German Ostsiedlung.

== History ==
Tempelhove was first mentioned in a 1247 deed issued at the Walkenried Abbey as a Komturhof (commander's court, the smallest holding entity of a military order) of the Knights Templar, whose leadership and many fellow knights had been expelled from the Kingdom of Jerusalem upon its downfall in 1291. The heart of the old settlement, consisting of the church and the original estate, was fortified and originally completely surrounded by water. The Templars were joined by fifteen families of landless farmers' sons from the Rhine, who could not inherit any estate from their parents because of over-fragmentation of those estates. Legates of the Templars offered them fertile soil and the protection of Tempelhove's stronghold.

After Pope Clement V officially abolished the Order of the Temple in 1312, the knights of Saint John (the Johanniter), backed by Margrave Waldemar of Brandenburg, took over the villages of Tempelhof, Mariendorf, and Marienfelde. In 1435, they sold their estates to the city of Berlin.

In the early nineteenth century, Tempelhof was still a village outside Berlin proper and was the site of country excursions for the citizens of Berlin. The northern parts of Tempelhof were incorporated as Berlin's Tempelhofer Vorstadt in 1861 and in 1920 became part of the Kreuzberg borough.

Today, the former commandery (German: Komturei) is a chain of parks, called Bosepark, Kleiner Park, Alter Park, and Franckepark. Some of them still have ponds that were part of the artificial moat surrounding the village's center. One, the Krummer Pfuhl, located in the Franckepark, after being turned into public swimming baths in the nineteenth century, has completely dried out and is now an enclosed deer park.

The original church, built from glacial boulders, was destroyed in the Second World War and was replaced with one built of ashlar or dressed stone with a timber-frame tower.

The Tempelhof Studios were established in 1912 and functioned as film and later television studios.

== Gallery ==
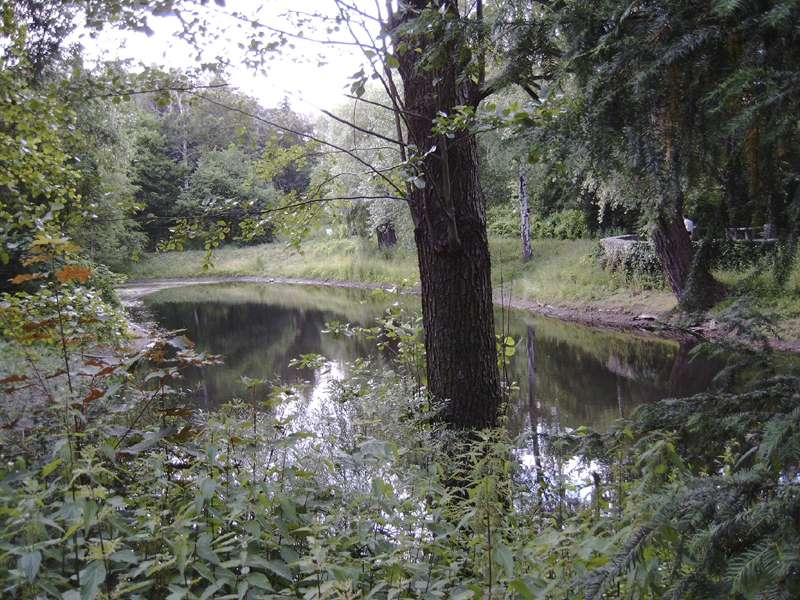
Lehnepfuhl in the Kleiner Park

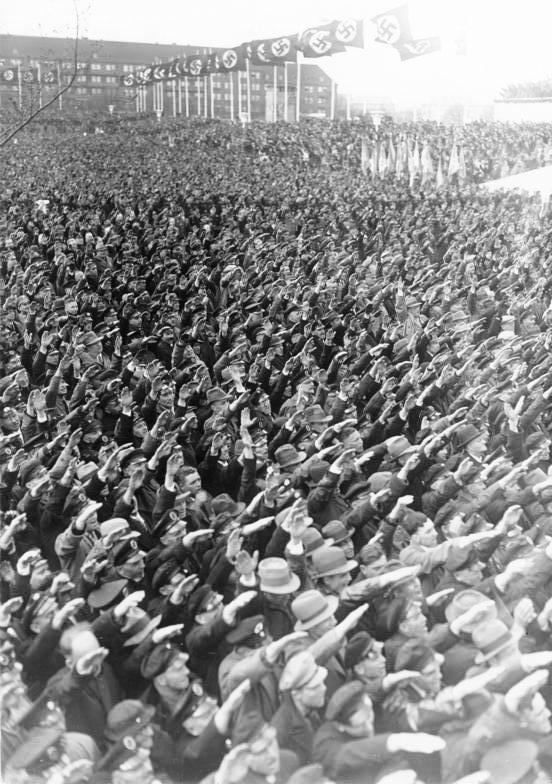
Tempelhof Airfield in 1935

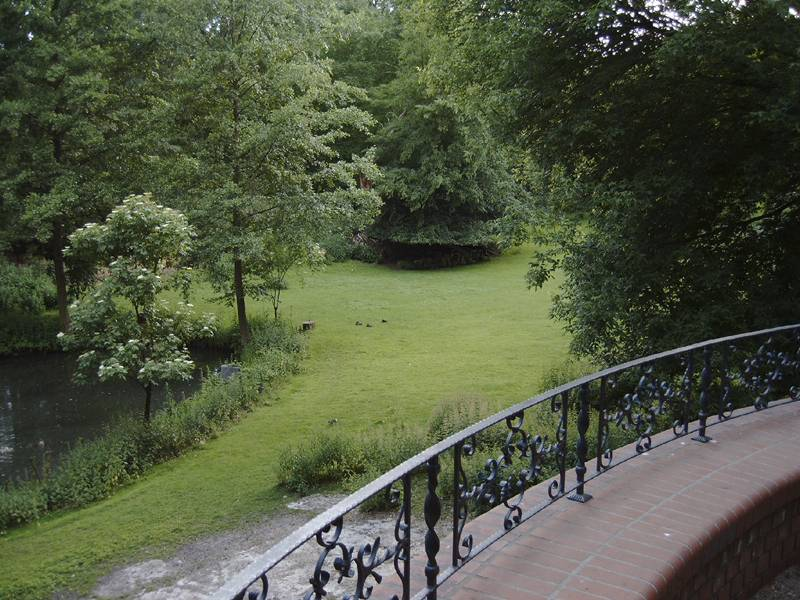
The deer park that was once the Krummer Pfuhl

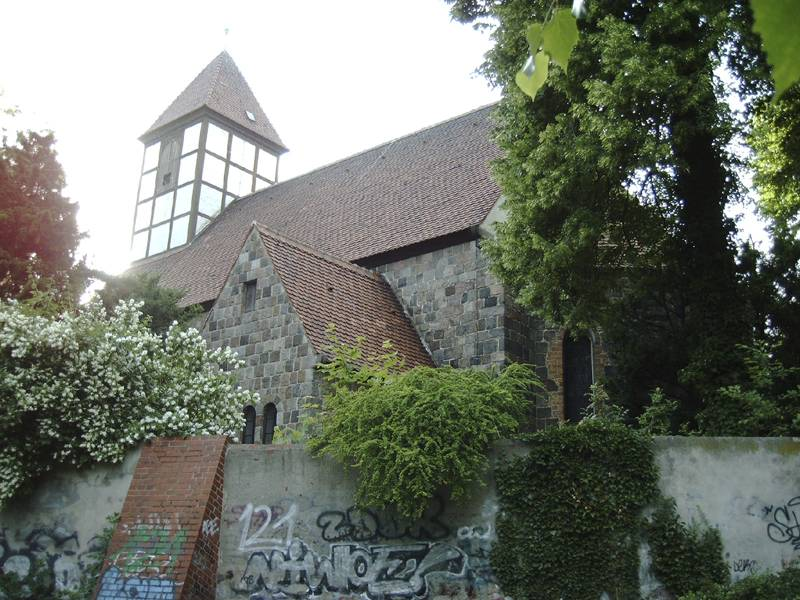
Village church as it looks today, its basic lower structures of boulders trace back to the commandry.

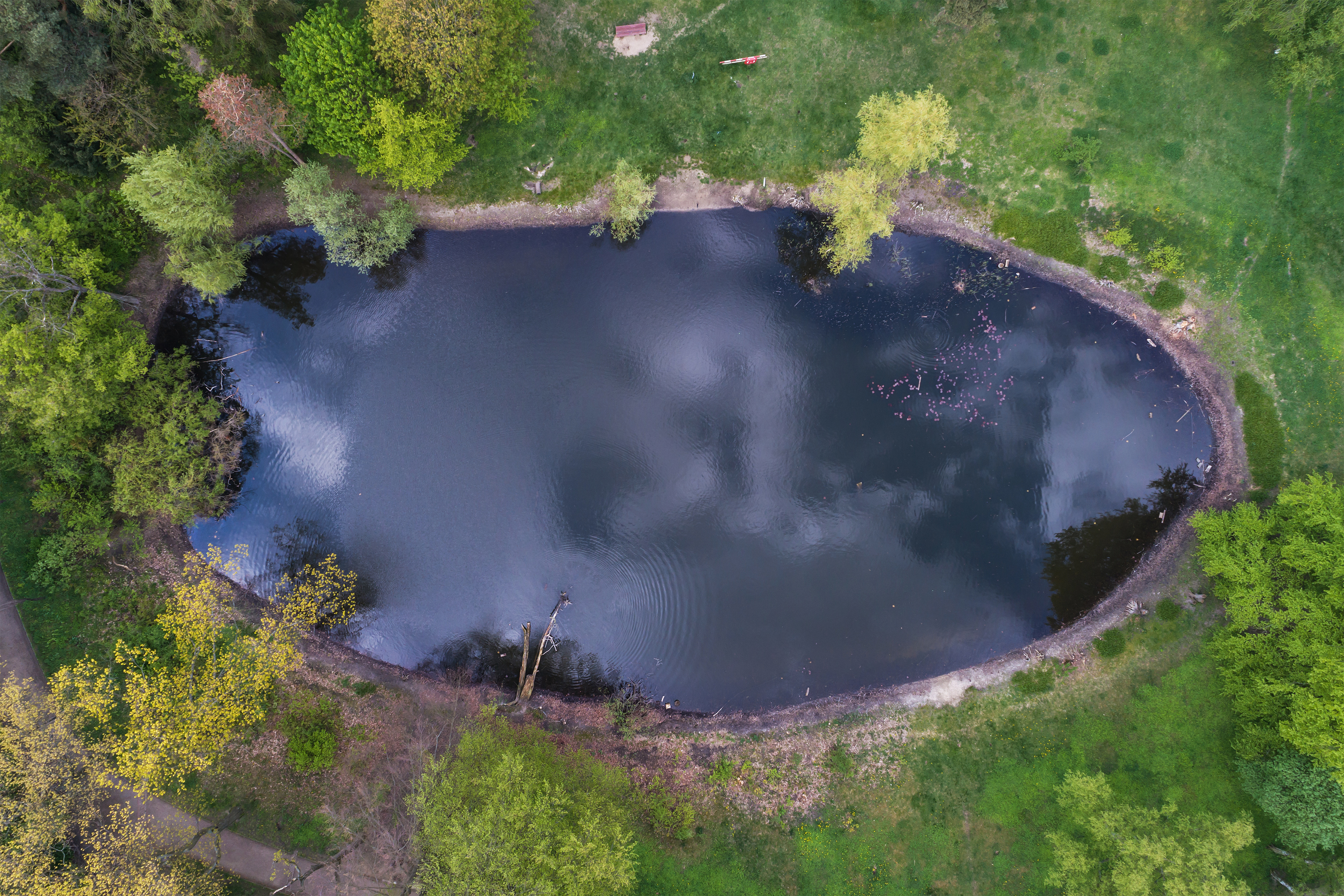
Natural monument "Blanke Helle"

== Sister cities ==
- Charleston, South Carolina, United States
- Nahariya, Israel
- London Borough of Barnet, England, United Kingdom
- Amstelveen, Netherlands

== Personalities ==
=== Sons and daughters Tempelhof ===
- Manny Marc (born 1980), DJ and rapper
- Klaus Wowereit (born 1953 in Altbezirk Tempelhof), SPD-politician, 1984-1995 Council Chairman of Tempelhof, 2001-2014 Governing Mayor of Berlin
- Michael Müller (born 1964 in Altbezirk Tempelhof), SPD politician, from 1989 to 1996 member of the Borough Council (BVV) Tempelhof, since 2014 mayor, succeeding Klaus Wowereit

=== Personalities associated with Tempelhof ===
- Edmund Elend (1881–1933), merchant and owner of the former department store Kaufhaus Tempelhof
- Elisabeth Schumacher (1904–1942), graphic artist and resistance fighter of the Rote Kapelle, lived at Werner-Voß-Damm 42
- Kurt Schumacher (1905–1942), sculptor, medallist and resistance fighter of the Rote Kapelle, lived at Werner-Voß-Damm 42
- Marta Hillers (1911–2001), German journalist, lived until after the war in an apartment in the Manfred-von-Richthofen-Straße 13 (then number 31). She has recorded her experiences during the capture of the city and the subsequent occupation of the Red Army in diaries, that were published in Germany in 1959 under the German title: Eine Frau in Berlin. In 2008 a film was made with Nina Hoss as leading lady under the German title: Anonyma eine Frau in Berlin

== See also ==
- Rauenberg
