= Białykał =

- Village
- Location within Poland
- Coordinates: 51°33′N 17°3′E
- Country: Poland
- Voivodeship: Greater Poland
- County: Rawicz
- Gmina: Pakosław
- Population (approx.): 150

Białykał ([bjaˈwɨkau̯]; formerly: Biały Kał) is a village in the administrative district of Gmina Pakosław, within Rawicz County, Greater Poland Voivodeship, in west-central Poland.

The village has an approximate population of 150.

In 1999, the village changed its name, from Biały Kał, because it evoked a bad association, as the phrase literally means "White Feces".
