= Orla (Barycz) =

River in Poland

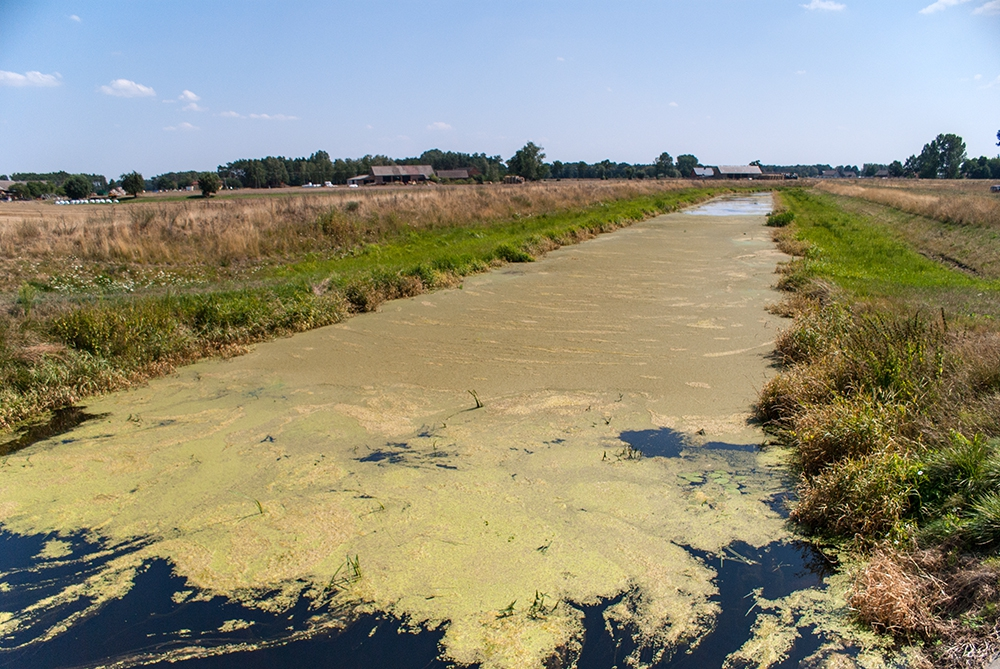
- The Orla in Zaorle

Location
- Country: Poland

Physical characteristics
- Source
  - location: Koźminiec, Greater Poland Voivodeship
  - coordinates: 51°47′54″N 17°37′35″E
  - elevation: 155 m (509 ft)
- Mouth: Barycz
  - location: west of Wąsosz, Lower Silesian Voivodeship
  - coordinates: 51°34′07″N 16°40′02″E
  - elevation: 83 m (272 ft)
- Length: 95.1 km (59.1 mi)
- Basin size: 1,601 km^{2} (618 mi^{2})
- Discharge
  - average: 4,457 m^{3}/s (157,400 cu ft/s) in Korzeńsko

Basin features
- Progression: Barycz→ Oder→ Baltic Sea
- Tributaries
  - left: Radęca

Orla is a river in middle-western Poland, a right-bank tributary of the Barycz. It meets the Barycz at the town of Wąsosz.
