= Pakosław, Rawicz County =

Pakosław
- Village
- Location within Poland
- Coordinates: 51°37′N 17°3′E
- Country: Poland
- Voivodeship: Greater Poland
- County: Rawicz
- Gmina: Pakosław
- Population: 890
- Website: https://www.pakoslaw.pl/

Pakosław [paˈkɔswaf] is a village in Rawicz County, Greater Poland Voivodeship, in west-central Poland. It is the seat of the gmina (administrative district) called Gmina Pakosław.

== Twin towns – sister cities ==
Pakosław is twinned with:

- Moult-Chicheboville, France. Since 1991
