= Wąsosz =

Town in Lower Silesian Voivodeship, Poland

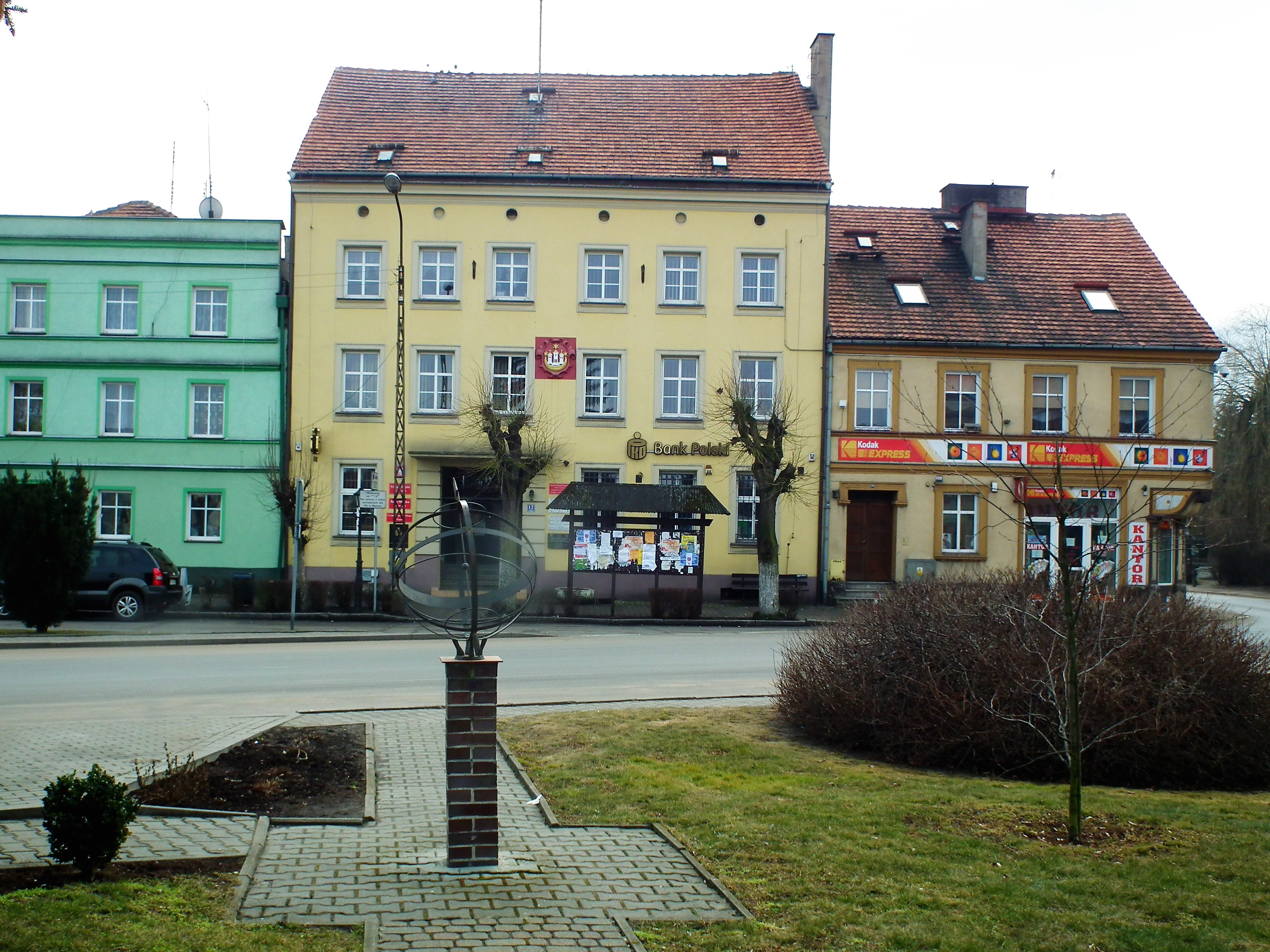
- Market Square (Rynek) in Wąsosz

- Coat of arms

- Location within Poland
- Coordinates: 51°33′N 16°42′E
- Country: Poland
- Voivodeship: Lower Silesian
- County: Góra
- Gmina: Wąsosz
- Town rights: 1290

Government
  - Mayor: Paweł Niedźwiedź

Area
  - Total: 3.24 km^{2} (1.25 sq mi)
- Highest elevation: 100 m (330 ft)
- Lowest elevation: 80 m (260 ft)

Population (2019-06-30)
  - Total: 2,662
  - Density: 822/km^{2} (2,130/sq mi)
- Time zone: UTC+1 (CET)
  - Summer (DST): UTC+2 (CEST)
- Postal code: 56-210
- Vehicle registration: DGR
- Website: http://wasosz.eu/

Wąsosz [ˈvɔ̃sɔʂ] (formerly German: Herrnstadt) is a town in Góra County, Lower Silesian Voivodeship, in western Poland. It is the seat of the administrative district (gmina) called Gmina Wąsosz. The rivers Orla and Barycz meet here.

As of 2019, the town had a population of 2,662.

== History ==
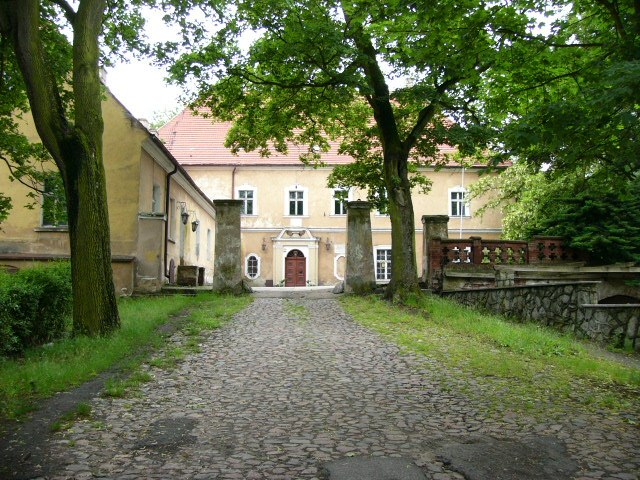
Piast Castle in Wąsosz

Wąsosz dates back to the medieval Piast-ruled Kingdom of Poland and its name is of Polish origin. Following the fragmentation of Poland into smaller provincial duchies, Wąsosz initially formed part of Greater Poland before it passed to Silesia, and later the Duchy of Głogów. It was granted town rights by Henry III, Duke of Głogów in 1290. It was part of the Duchy of Głogów of fragmented Poland and in the 14th century the local castle of the Piast dukes was built. The castle was unsuccessfully besieged by the Hussites in 1432. In 1520 Wąsosz passed to the bishops of Wrocław and in 1525 it passed again under Piast rule as part of the Duchy of Legnica.

After the dissolution of the duchy in 1675, the town became part of Habsburg-ruled Bohemia, in the 18th century it was annexed by the Kingdom of Prussia, and wad administrated as part of the Guhrau district in the Prussian Province of Silesia and later in the Province of Lower Silesia.

During World War II, in 1943, the Germans established a camp for Polish children up to 5 years of age, who were deemed "racially worthless", and whose mothers were deported to forced labour camps in Lower Silesia. At least 485 Polish children passed through the camp, and due to its terrible sanitary conditions many died and the bodies were transported in wheelbarrows to the local cemetery. Only 39 children survived until the liberation of the camp. Local pastor Paul Tillmann rescued these children when, during the German evacuation the camp, he opposed the idea of blowing up the building with the children, and looked after them until the town was liberated.

== Transport ==
National road 36 passes through Wąsosz which connects it to Rawicz to the east and to Lubin to the west.

The nearest railway station is in Rawicz.

== Gallery ==
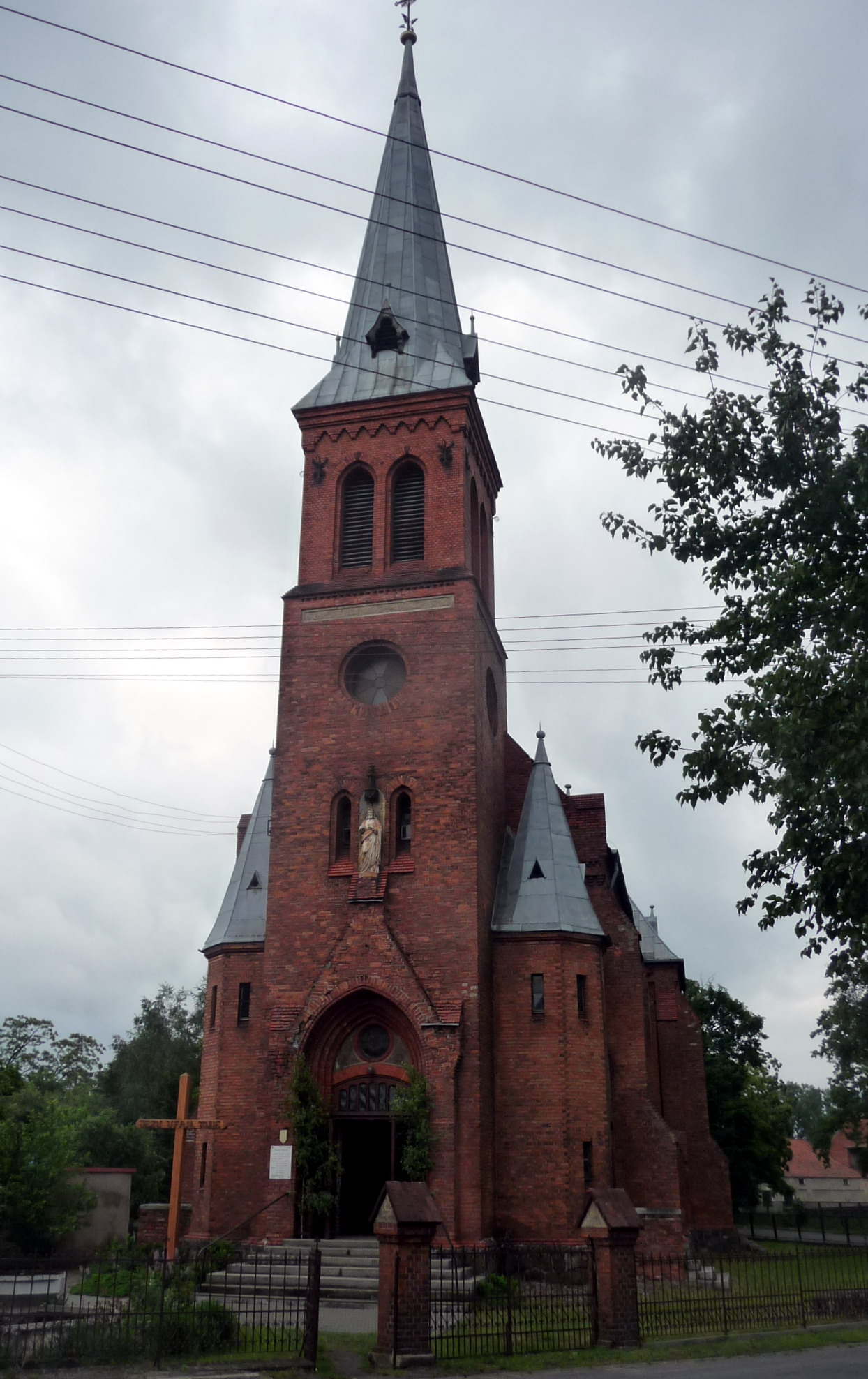
Catholic Church of Saint Joseph

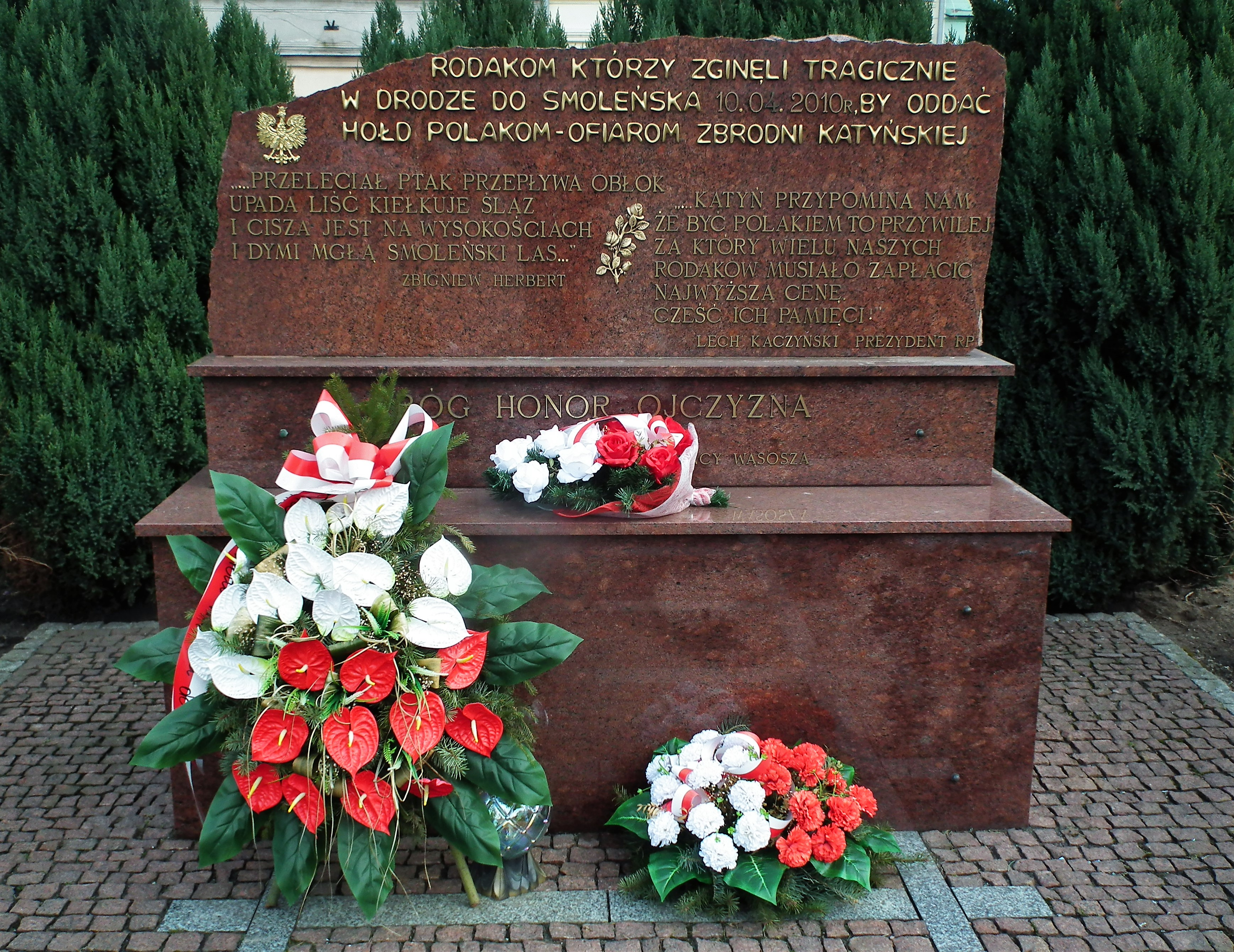
Smolensk air disaster memorial

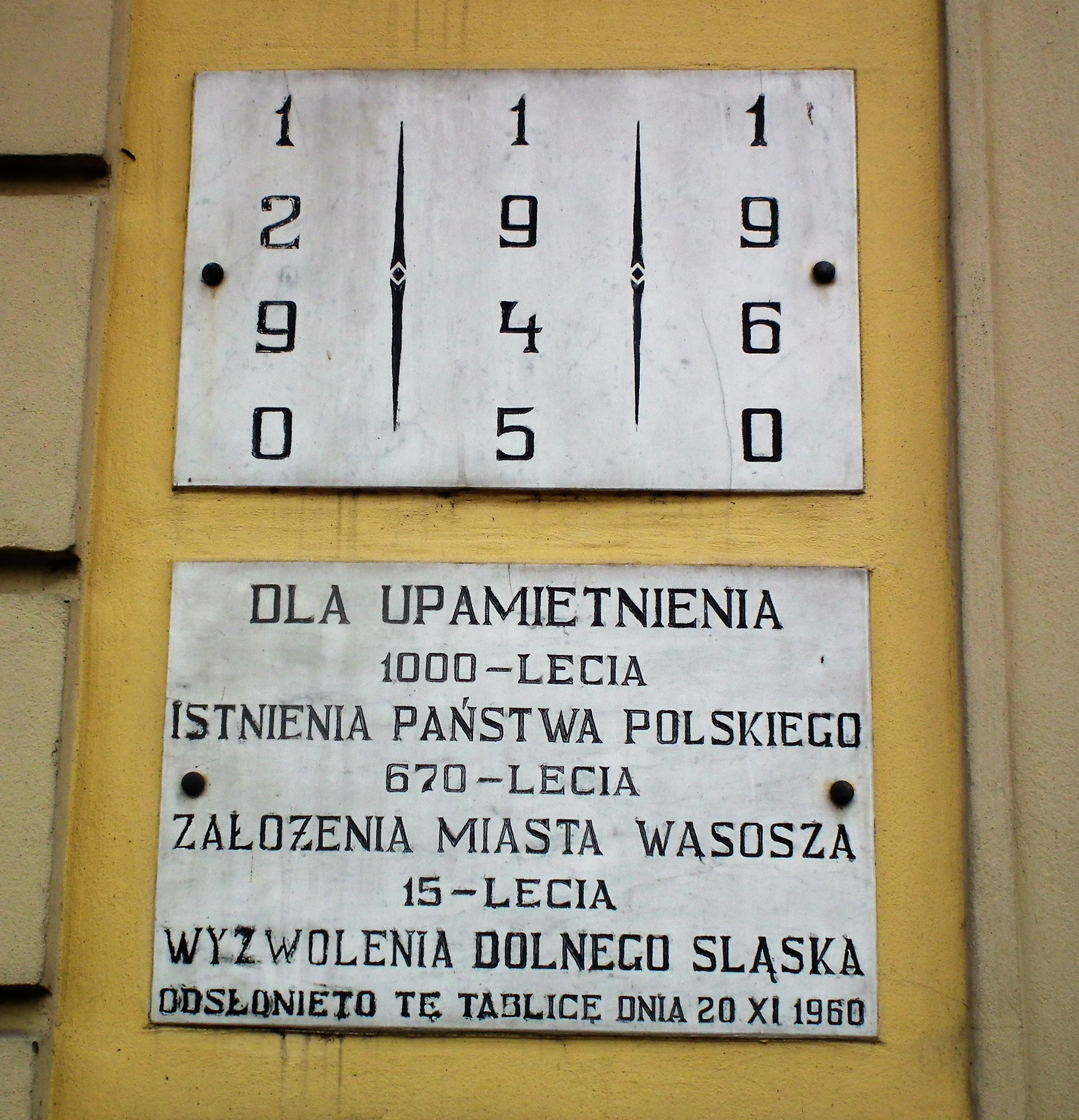
Plaque from 1960 commemorating the 1000th anniversary of Poland, 670th anniversary of Wąsosz and the 15th anniversary of Poland's recovery of Lower Silesia
