= Michael Friedländer =

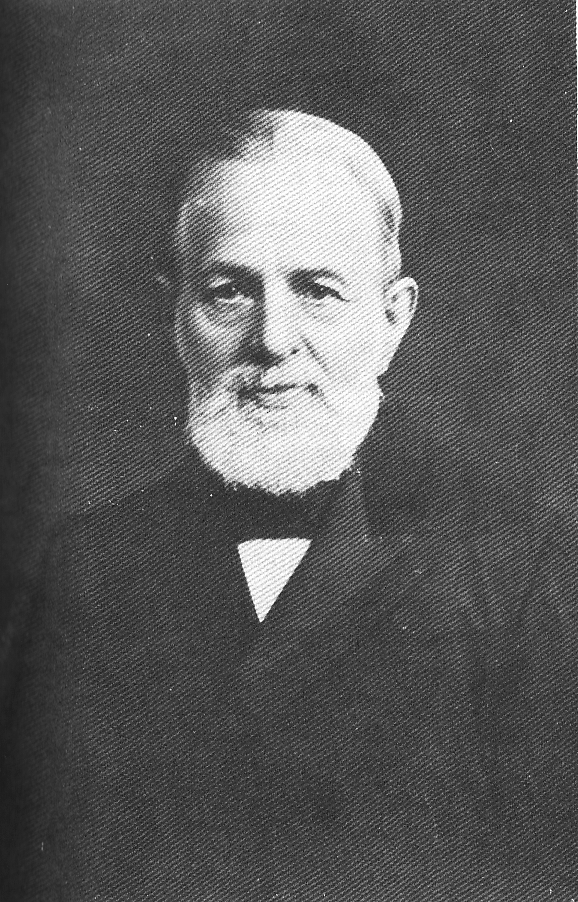
- Portrait of Michael Friedländer.
- Born: 29 April 1833; Jutroschin, Posen
- Died: 10 December 1910 (aged 77)

Michael Friedländer (29 April 1833 – 10 December 1910) was an Orientalist and principal of Jews' College, London. He is best known for his English translation of Maimonides' Guide to the Perplexed, which was the most popular such translation until the more recent work of Shlomo Pines, and still remains in print.

== Biography ==
Friedländer was born at Jutroschin, in the Grand Duchy of Posen. His early secular education was at a local Catholic school, and his Jewish education came from attendance of a Cheder, and from his father, who was a talmudist and Hebrew grammarian. He then attended the gymnasium, while continuing his Jewish studies under Rabbi Jacob Joseph Oettinger and Rabbi Elchanan Rosenstein.

In 1856, he began studies in classical languages and mathematics at the universities of Berlin and Halle/Saale (Ph.D. 1862), and concurrently with the university studies he pursued Talmudic learning. Settling in Berlin, he was appointed principal of the Talmud school, a position which he resigned in 1865 to accept that of the principal of Jews' College, London, in succession to Barnett Abrahams. There he taught theology, biblical and rabbinical exegesis, Talmud, Jewish history, mathematics, and Arabic.

He retired from this position in 1907, and died on 10 December 1910. His son-in-law was Moses Gaster (1856–1939), the Hakham of the Spanish and Portuguese congregation, London, and a Hebrew linguist.

== Works ==
Title page of The Guide for the Perplexed by Moses Maimonides, translated from the original Arabic text by M. Friedländer, Ph.D., Pardes Publishing House, 1946.

Friedländer displayed considerable literary activity. He authored a few dozen articles for the Jewish Encyclopedia. As a member of the Society of Hebrew Literature he published under its auspices:

- The Commentary of Abraham ibn Ezra on Isaiah, translated into English with extensive annotations (available on Google Books)
- An Essay on the Writings of Ibn Ezra
- A translation from the original Arabic, with notes, of Maimonides' Guide of the Perplexed (1881).
- The Jewish Religion (1890, American edition: 1946)
- German commentary upon the Song of Songs (1867).

He also edited a Jewish Family Bible in English and Hebrew, compiled a Handbook of the Jewish Religion, made calculations on the Hebrew calendar, and contributed articles to the Jewish Quarterly Review, the Dictionary of National Biography, and other publications. Numerous papers read by him at Jews' College and elsewhere have been published.
