= Sworowo =

- Village
- Location within Poland
- Coordinates: 51°34′N 17°2′E
- Country: Poland
- Voivodeship: Greater Poland
- County: Rawicz
- Gmina: Pakosław

Sworowo [sfɔˈrɔvɔ] is a village in the administrative district of Gmina Pakosław, within Rawicz County, Greater Poland Voivodeship, in west-central Poland.
