= Chojno, Rawicz County =

Chojno
- Village
- Location within Poland
- Coordinates: 51°38′N 17°0′E
- Country: Poland
- Voivodeship: Greater Poland
- County: Rawicz
- Gmina: Pakosław

Chojno (Polish pronunciation: [ˈxɔjnɔ]) is a village in the administrative district of Gmina Pakosław, within Rawicz County, Greater Poland Voivodeship, in west-central Poland.
