= Skrzyptowo =

- Settlement
- Location within Poland
- Coordinates: 51°34′08″N 17°00′32″E
- Country: Poland
- Voivodeship: Greater Poland
- County: Rawicz
- Gmina: Pakosław

Skrzyptowo [skʂɨpˈtɔvɔ] is a settlement in the administrative district of Gmina Pakosław, within Rawicz County, Greater Poland Voivodeship, in west-central Poland.
