= Halin, Poland =

Halin
- Settlement
- Location within Poland
- Coordinates: 51°34′39″N 17°03′06″E
- Country: Poland
- Voivodeship: Greater Poland
- County: Rawicz
- Gmina: Pakosław

Halin [ˈxalin] is a settlement in the administrative district of Gmina Pakosław, within Rawicz County, Greater Poland Voivodeship, in west-central Poland.
