= Zielony Dąb, Greater Poland Voivodeship =

Zielony Dąb
- Settlement
- Location within Poland
- Coordinates: 51°36′42″N 17°06′46″E
- Country: Poland
- Voivodeship: Greater Poland
- County: Rawicz
- Gmina: Pakosław

Zielony Dąb (Polish pronunciation: [ʑɛˈlɔnɨ ˈdɔmp]) is a settlement in the administrative district of Gmina Pakosław, within Rawicz County, Greater Poland Voivodeship, in west-central Poland.
