= Chicheboville =

Commune in Calvados, France

- Part of Moult-Chicheboville
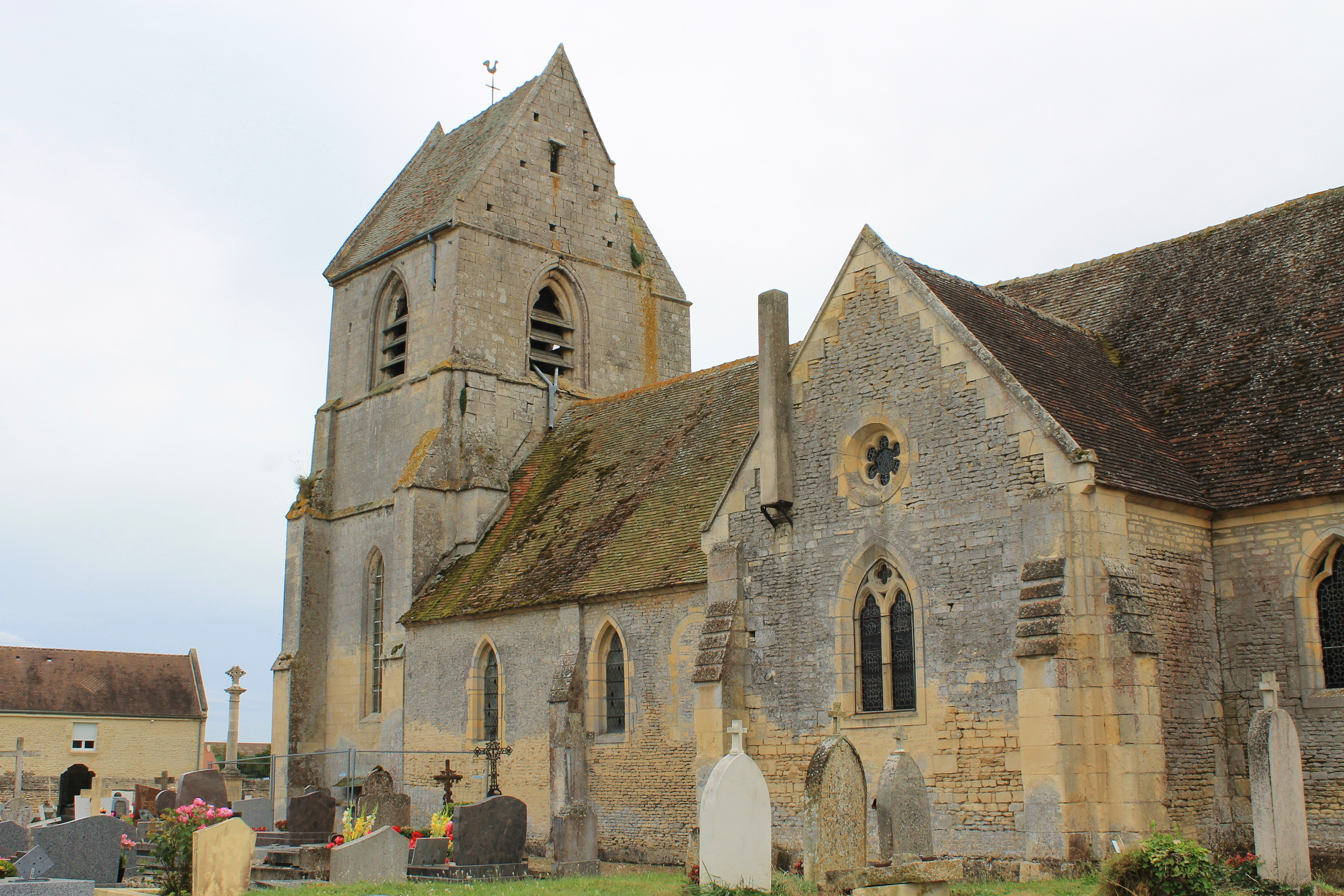
- Location of Chicheboville
- Location within France Location within Normandy
- Coordinates: 49°06′38″N 0°12′56″W
- Country: France
- Region: Normandy
- Department: Calvados
- Arrondissement: Caen
- Canton: Troarn
- Commune: Moult-Chicheboville
- Area^{1}: 7.54 km^{2} (2.91 sq mi)
- Elevation: 25 m (82 ft)
- Highest elevation: 72 m (236 ft)
- Lowest elevation: 17 m (56 ft)
- Population (2022): 583
  - Density: 77.3/km^{2} (200/sq mi)
- Time zone: UTC+01:00 (CET)
  - Summer (DST): UTC+02:00 (CEST)
- Postal code: 14370
- ^{1} French Land Register data, which excludes lakes, ponds, glaciers > 1 km^{2} (0.386 sq mi or 247 acres) and river estuaries.

Chicheboville (French pronunciation: [ʃiʃbɔvil]) is a former commune in the Calvados department in the Normandy region in northwestern France. On 1 January 2017, it was merged into the new commune Moult-Chicheboville.

== Population ==
Population of Chicheboville
Year	Pop.	±%
1962	430	—
1968	377	−12.3%
1975	395	+4.8%
1982	453	+14.7%
1990	463	+2.2%
1999	460	−0.6%
2008	507	+10.2%

In 1835 the former commune of Béneauville became part of Chicheboville.

Population of Béneauville
Year	Pop.	±% p.a.
1793	144	—
1800	149	+0.49%
1806	143	−0.68%
1821	171	+1.20%
1831	137	−2.19%
Source: EHESS

== See also ==
- Communes of the Calvados department
