= Barycz (river) =

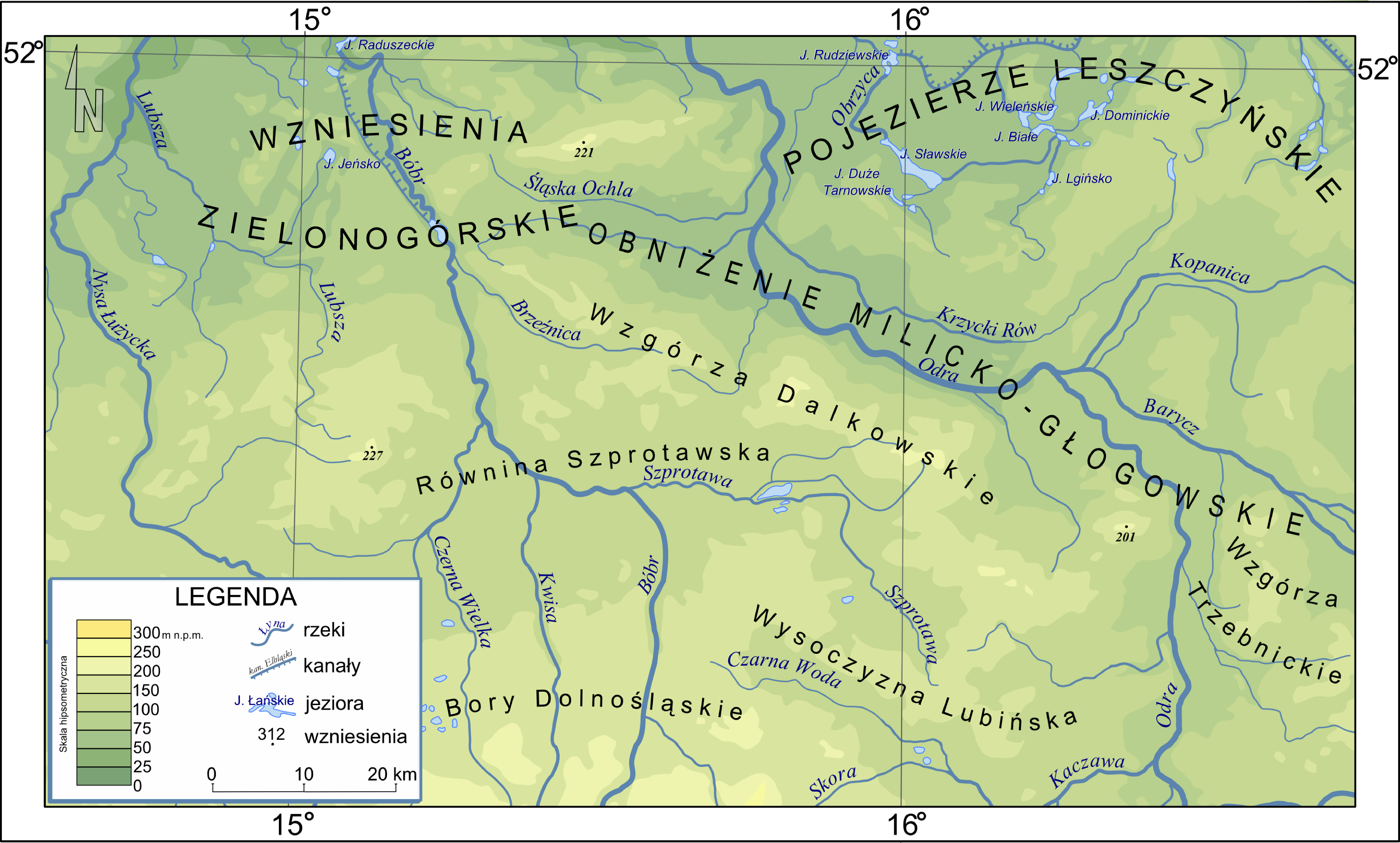
- Barycz River on a map of the Silesian-Lusatian Lowlands

Location
- Country: Poland

Physical characteristics
- Source
  - location: near Ostrów Wielkopolski
- Mouth
  - location: Oder at Wyszanów
  - coordinates: 51°41′11″N 16°15′9″E
  - elevation: 75.8 metres (249 ft)
- Length: 136 km (85 mi)
- Basin size: 5,547 km^{2} (2,142 sq mi)
- Discharge
  - average: 18.8 m^{3}/s (660 cu ft/s)

Basin features
- Progression: Oder→ Baltic Sea

The Barycz (Polish pronunciation: [ˈbarɨtʂ]; German: Bartsch) is a river in Greater Poland and Lower Silesian Voivodeships in western Poland. It is a right tributary of the Odra River. The river course roughly marked the northern border of the historic region of Lower Silesia with Greater Poland.

The 136 km long Barycz has a basin area of 5,547 km^{2}. The surrounding terrain of the Barycz Valley Landscape Park is an important wetland reserve. Settlements on the Barycz include Odolanów, Milicz, Sułów, Żmigród, and Wąsosz. The Orla is among its tributaries.

== See also ==
- Rivers of Poland
