= Moult, Calvados =

Moult
- Part of Moult-Chicheboville
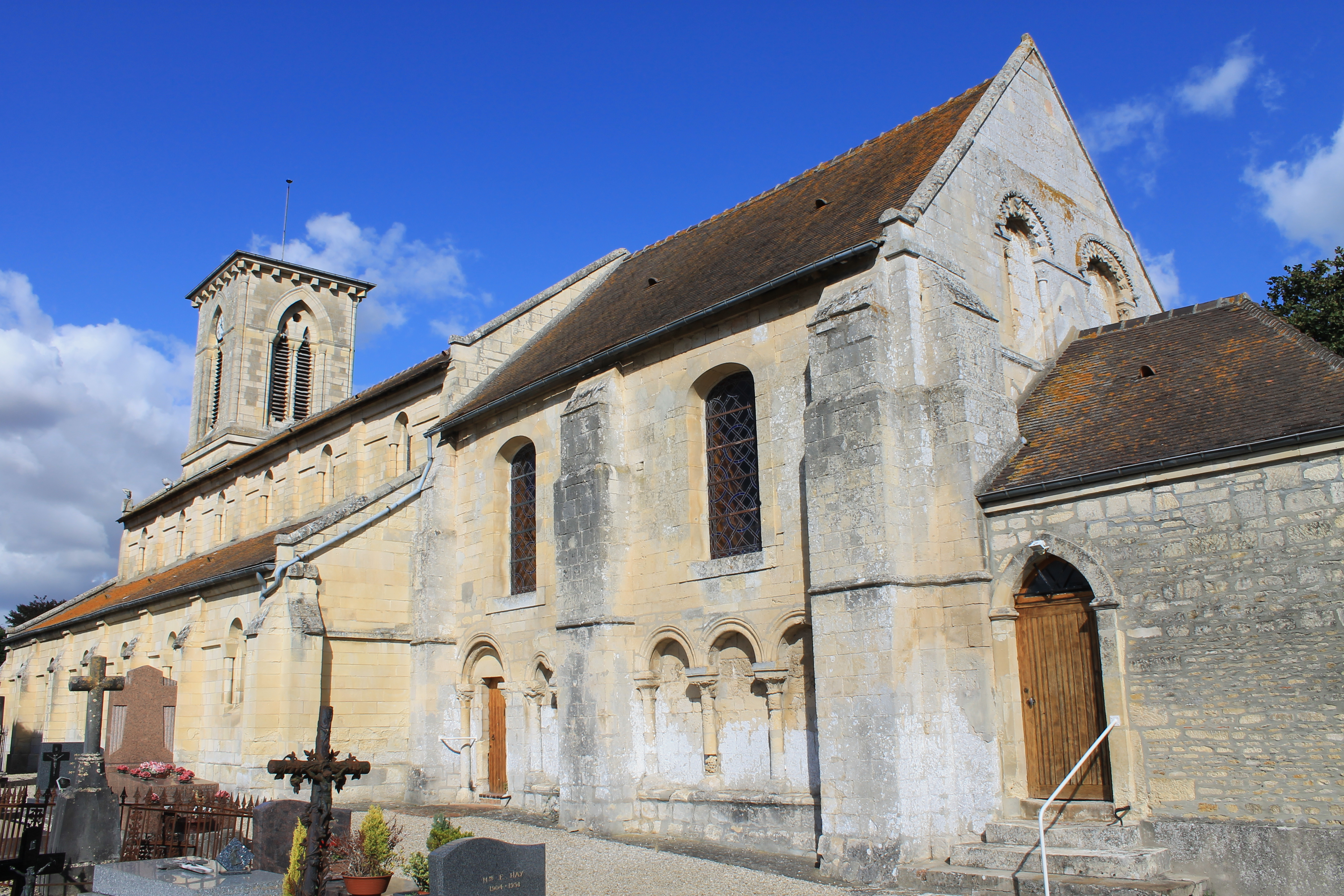
- Location of Moult
- Location within France Location within Normandy
- Coordinates: 49°06′58″N 0°09′50″W
- Country: France
- Region: Normandy
- Department: Calvados
- Arrondissement: Caen
- Canton: Troarn
- Commune: Moult-Chicheboville
- Area^{1}: 10.26 km^{2} (3.96 sq mi)
- Elevation: 60 m (200 ft)
- Highest elevation: 76 m (249 ft)
- Lowest elevation: 19 m (62 ft)
- Population (2022): 2,821
  - Density: 275.0/km^{2} (712.1/sq mi)
- Time zone: UTC+01:00 (CET)
  - Summer (DST): UTC+02:00 (CEST)
- Postal code: 14370
- ^{1} French Land Register data, which excludes lakes, ponds, glaciers > 1 km^{2} (0.386 sq mi or 247 acres) and river estuaries.

Moult (French pronunciation: [mult]) is a former commune in the Calvados department in the Normandy region in northwestern France. On 1 January 2017, it was merged into the new commune Moult-Chicheboville. The commune is situated about 16 kilometers southeast of Caen. It is in the valley of the Muance.

== History ==
The ancient ruins in and around the commune suggest that it was used as a fortified camp that controlled the area between Vieux and Lisieux.

== Population ==
Historical population
Year	Pop.	±% p.a.
1962	675	—
1968	670	−0.12%
1975	765	+1.91%
1982	827	+1.12%
1990	919	+1.33%
1999	1,130	+2.32%
2006	1,455	+3.68%
2022	2,821	+4.22%
Source: EHESS and INSEE

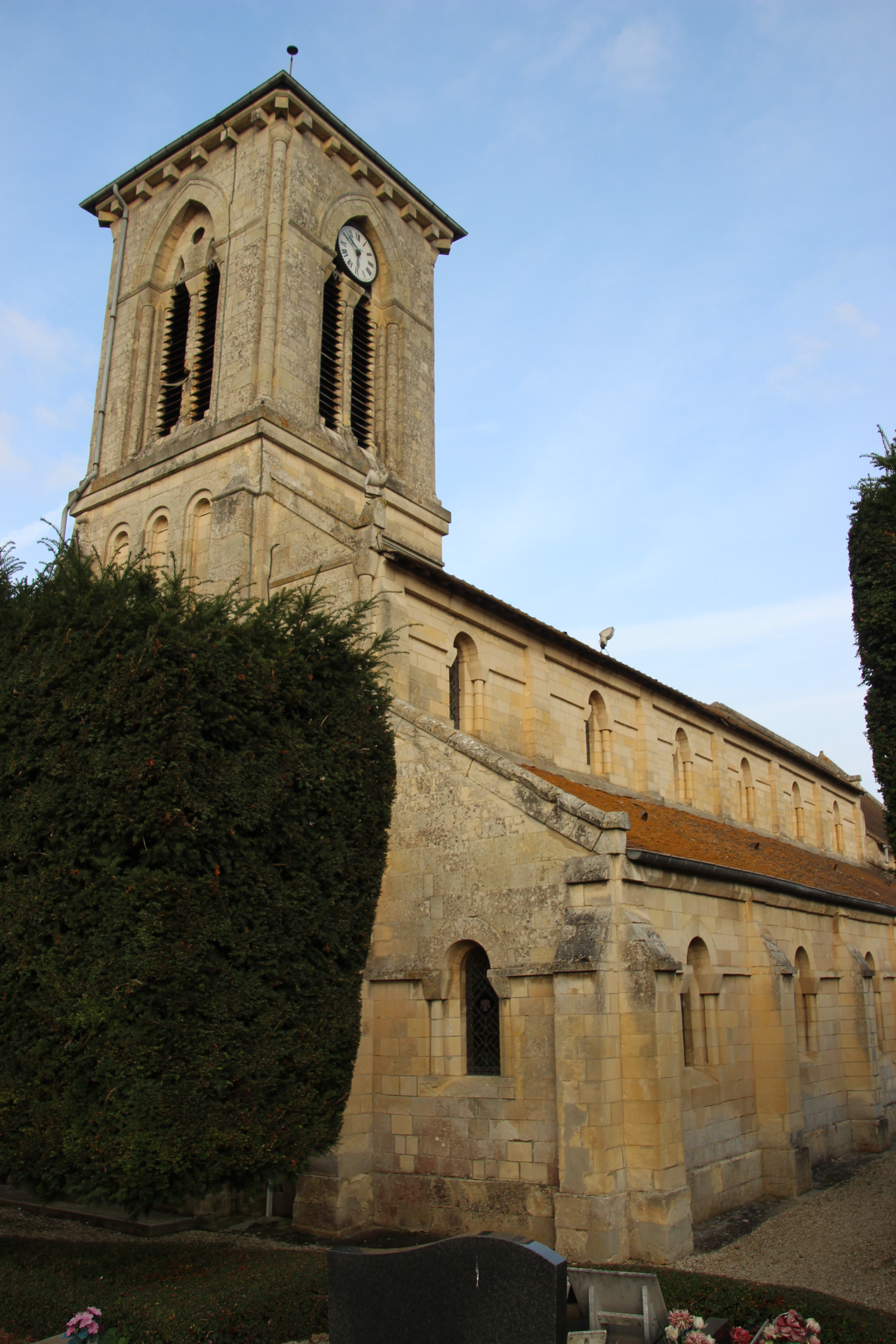
Saint Anne's Church

== Places and monuments ==
- Saint Anne's Church, whose choir dating from the 12th century has been listed as a historic monument since 4 October 1932.
- Washhouse on the Muance.
- Mill on the Muance.

== See also ==
- Communes of the Calvados department
