= Rauenberg (Berlin) =

Coordinates: 52.4519°N 13.3663°E

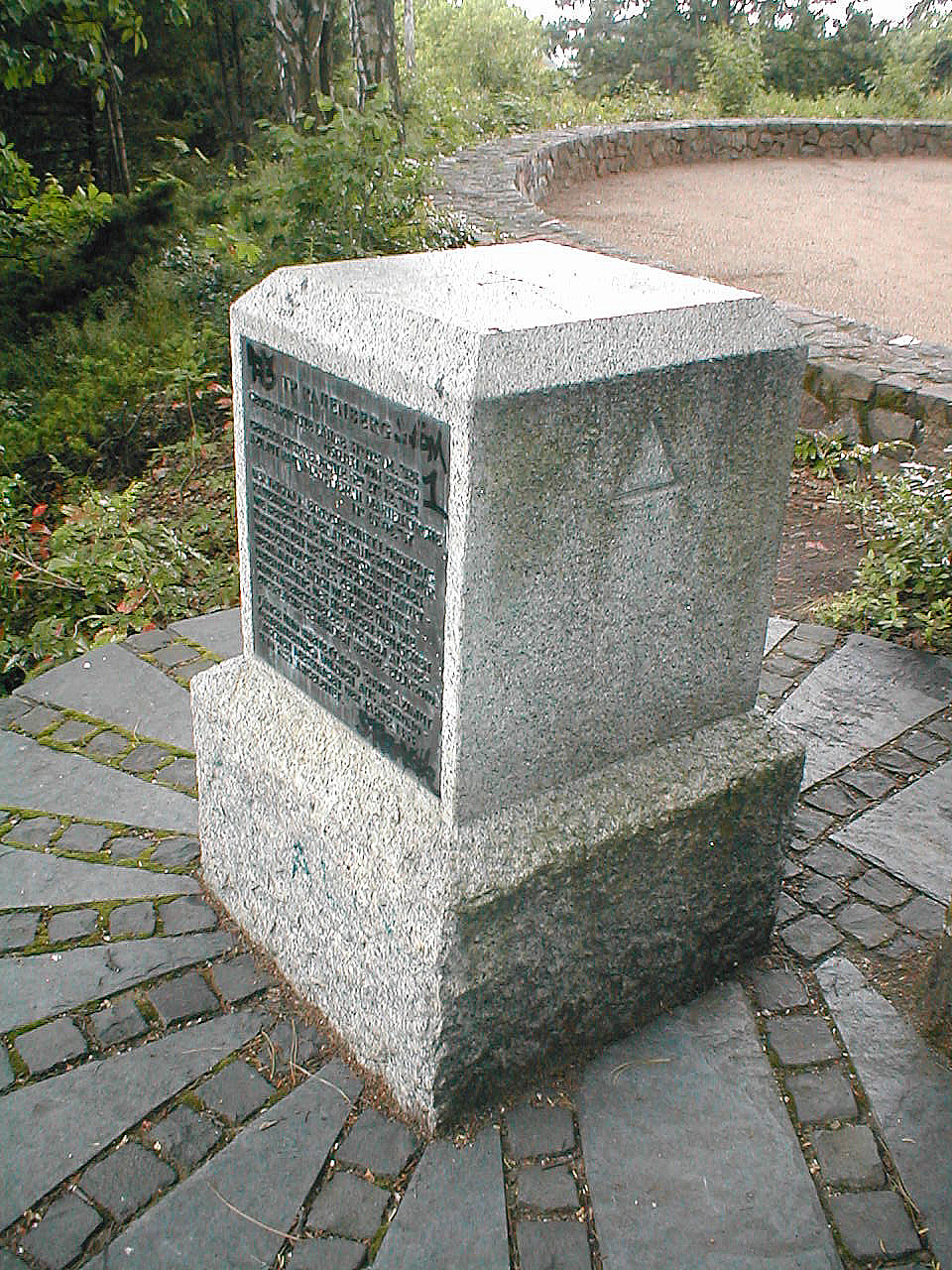

Rauenberg (German pronunciation: [ˈʁaʊənˌbɛʁk]) is a triangulation station located at Tempelhof, in the German city of Berlin. It was formerly used for mapping purposes and is now marked by a monument. It was first used in 1846.

== The monument ==
The inscription on the east side of the monument translates as follows:

TP Rauenberg

Longitude 31° 02′ 04″ 928 to the east of Ferro
Latitude 52° 27′ 12″ 021
Azimuth Rauenberg – Berlin Marienkirche 19° 46′ 04″ 87

The Rauenberg primary triangulation point is the starting point for the calculation of geographic coordinates of the Prussian main triangular mesh spatial reference system (Hauptdreiecksnetz). As the origin, it defines the location and orientation of the modern German triangular mesh spatial reference system in relation to the reference surface of a chosen Bessel ellipsoid.

Latitude and longitude (location) as well as the azimuth (orientation) are derived from astronomical measurements of the years 1853 and 1859.
