= Moult-Chicheboville =

- Commune
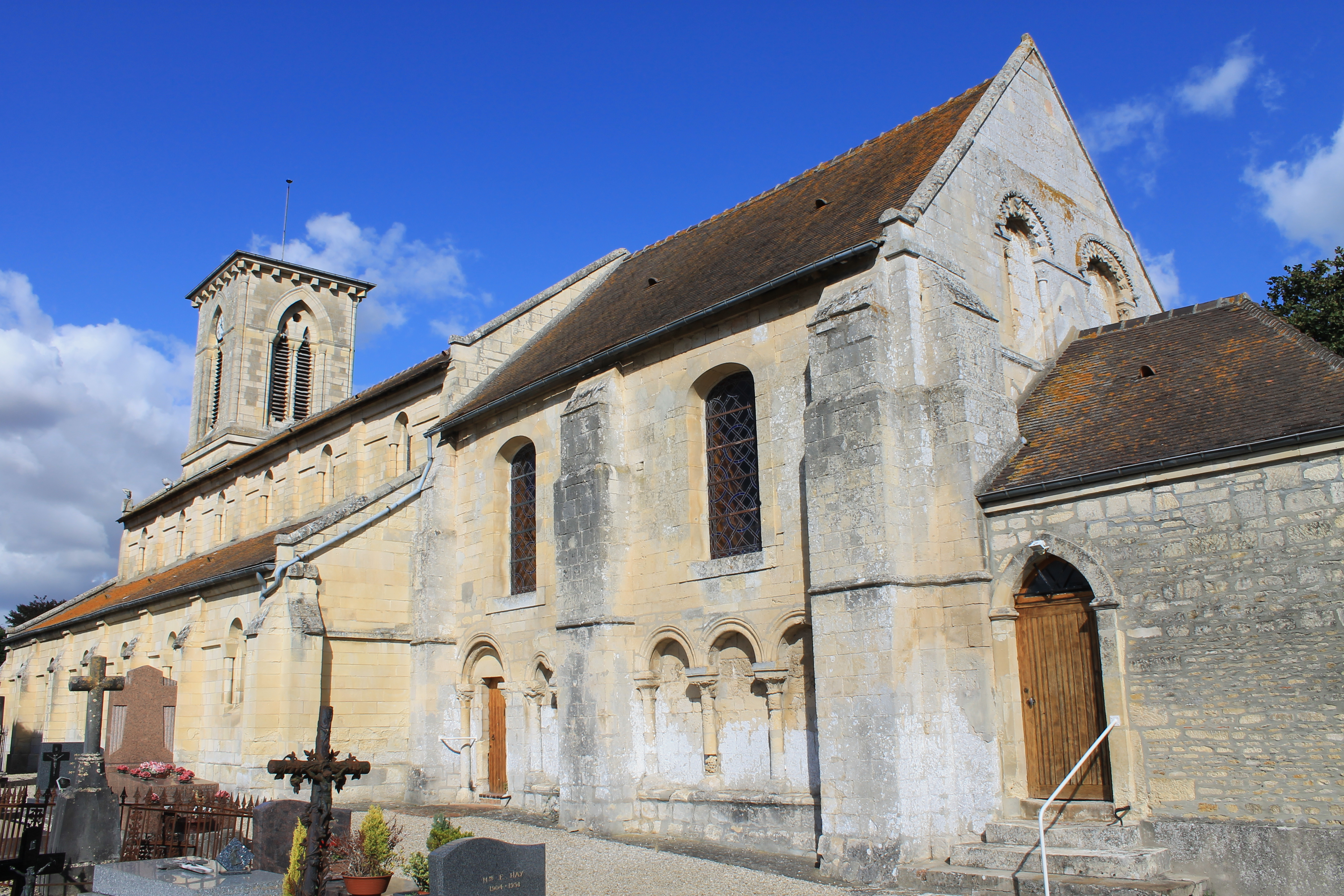
- The church in Moult
- Location of Moult-Chicheboville
- Location within France Location within Normandy
- Coordinates: 49°06′54″N 0°09′54″W
- Country: France
- Region: Normandy
- Department: Calvados
- Arrondissement: Caen
- Canton: Troarn
- Intercommunality: CC Val ès Dunes

Government
  - Mayor (2020–2026): Coralie Arruego
- Area^{1}: 17.80 km^{2} (6.87 sq mi)
- Population (2023): 3,441
  - Density: 193.3/km^{2} (500.7/sq mi)
- Time zone: UTC+01:00 (CET)
  - Summer (DST): UTC+02:00 (CEST)
- INSEE/Postal code: 14456 /14370
- ^{1} French Land Register data, which excludes lakes, ponds, glaciers > 1 km^{2} (0.386 sq mi or 247 acres) and river estuaries.

Moult-Chicheboville (French pronunciation: [mult ʃiʃbɔvil]) is a commune in the department of Calvados, northwestern France. The municipality was established on 1 January 2017 by merger of the former communes of Moult (the seat) and Chicheboville. Moult-Argences station has rail connections to Caen and Lisieux.

== Geography ==
The commune is made up of the following collection of villages and hamlets, Les Pédouzes, Moult, Ingouville and Chicheboville.

The Muance river and the Ruisseau des Petits Marais stream flow through the commune.

== Population ==
Historical population
| Year | Pop. | ±% p.a. |
|---|---|---|
| 1968 | 1,047 | — |
| 1975 | 1,160 | +1.47% |
| 1982 | 1,280 | +1.42% |
| 1990 | 1,382 | +0.96% |
| 1999 | 1,589 | +1.56% |
| 2007 | 2,203 | +4.17% |
| 2012 | 2,625 | +3.57% |
| 2017 | 3,095 | +3.35% |
| 2023 | 3,441 | +1.78% |
Source: INSEE

== Points of Interest ==
- Chicheboville-Bellengreville marsh is a 154 hectare Natura 2000 conservation site, shared with the neighbouring commune of Bellengreville. It is home to the Great raft spider a protected species that is officially listed as Vulnerable.

=== National Heritage sites ===
The Commune has three buildings and areas listed as a Monument historique

- Eglise Saint-Martin de Beneauville twelfth century church listed as a monument in 1932.
- Église Sainte Anne a twelfth century church listed as a monument in 1932.
- Château de Beneauville a seventeenth century chateau that was classed as a Monument historique in 1952.

== Twin towns – sister cities ==
Moult-Chicheboville is twinned with:

- Pakosław, Poland. Since 1991

== See also ==
- Communes of the Calvados department
