= Sowy, Greater Poland Voivodeship =

Sowy
- Village
- Location within Poland
- Coordinates: 51°35′N 17°3′E
- Country: Poland
- Voivodeship: Greater Poland
- County: Rawicz
- Gmina: Pakosław

Sowy [ˈsɔvɨ] is a village in the administrative district of Gmina Pakosław, within Rawicz County, Greater Poland Voivodeship, in west/central Poland.
