= January 1919 =

Month in 1919

<<	January 1919					>>
Su	Mo	Tu	We	Th	Fr	Sa
			1	2	3	4
5	6	7	8	9	10	11
12	13	14	15	16	17	18
19	20	21	22	23	24	25
26	27	28	29	30	31

The following events occurred in January 1919:

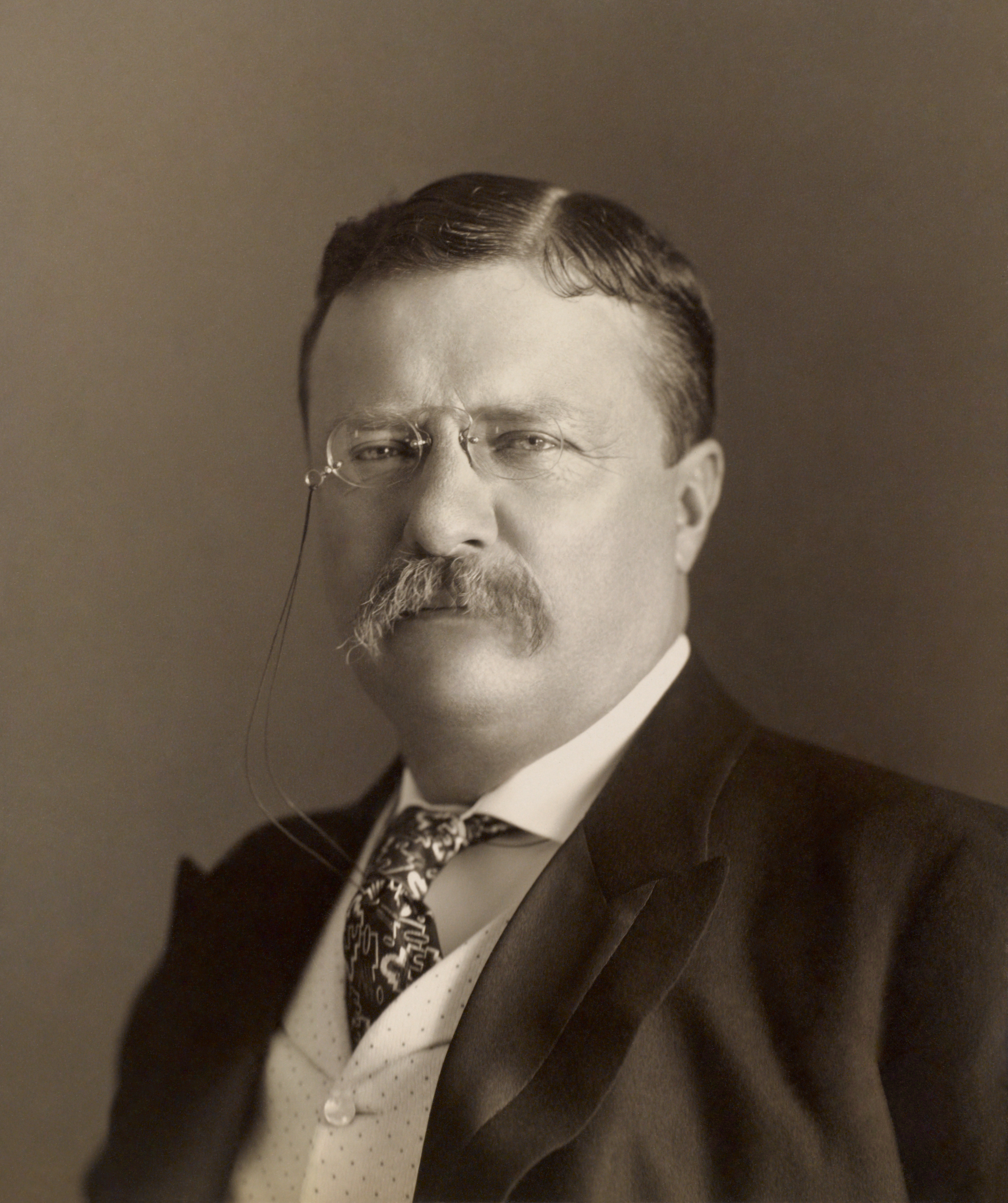
Former U.S. President Theodore Roosevelt dies at his home in Long Island, New York.

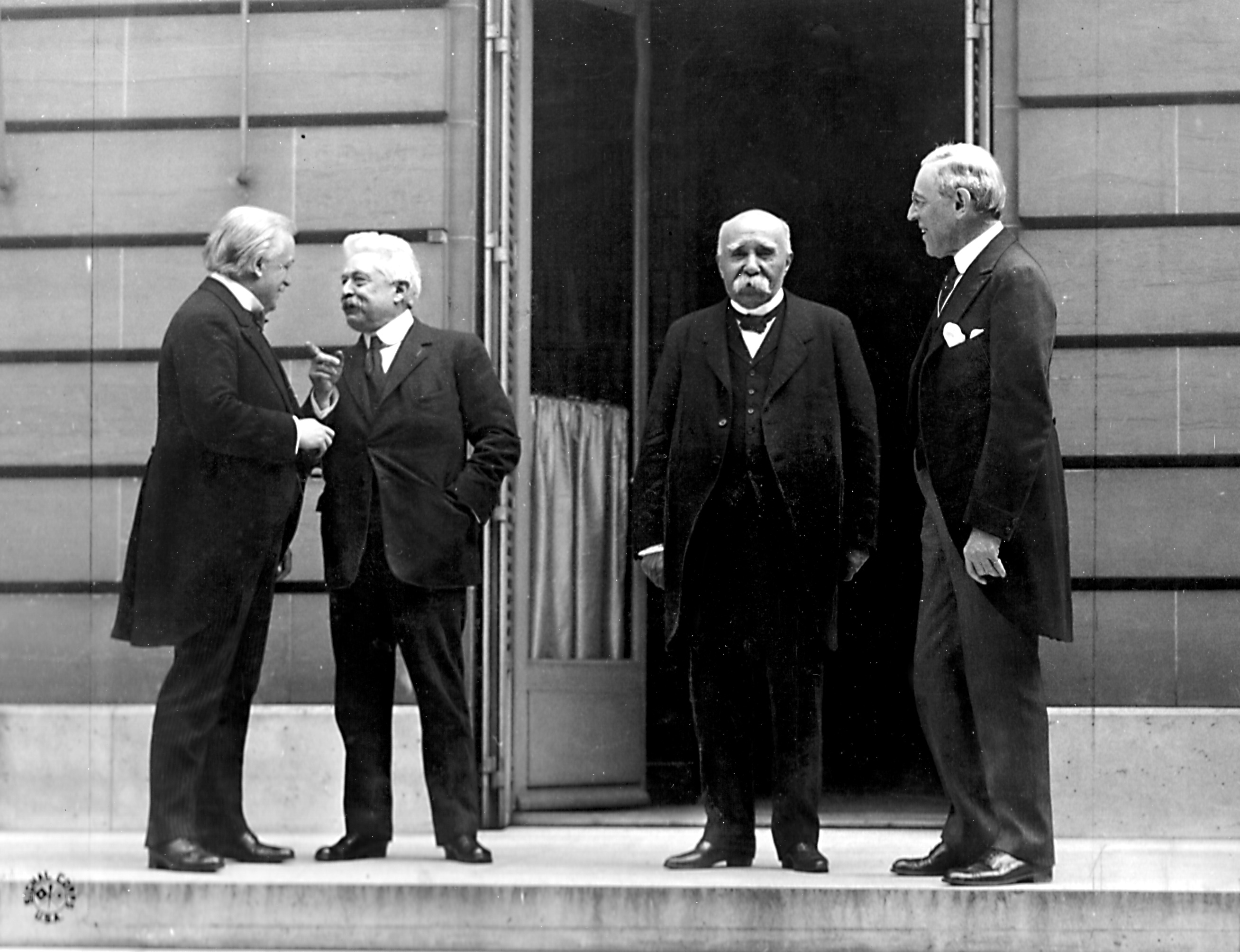
The "Big Four" at the Paris Peace Conference: (from left to right) David Lloyd George of the United Kingdom, Vittorio Emanuele Orlando of Italy, Georges Clemenceau of France and Woodrow Wilson of the United States.

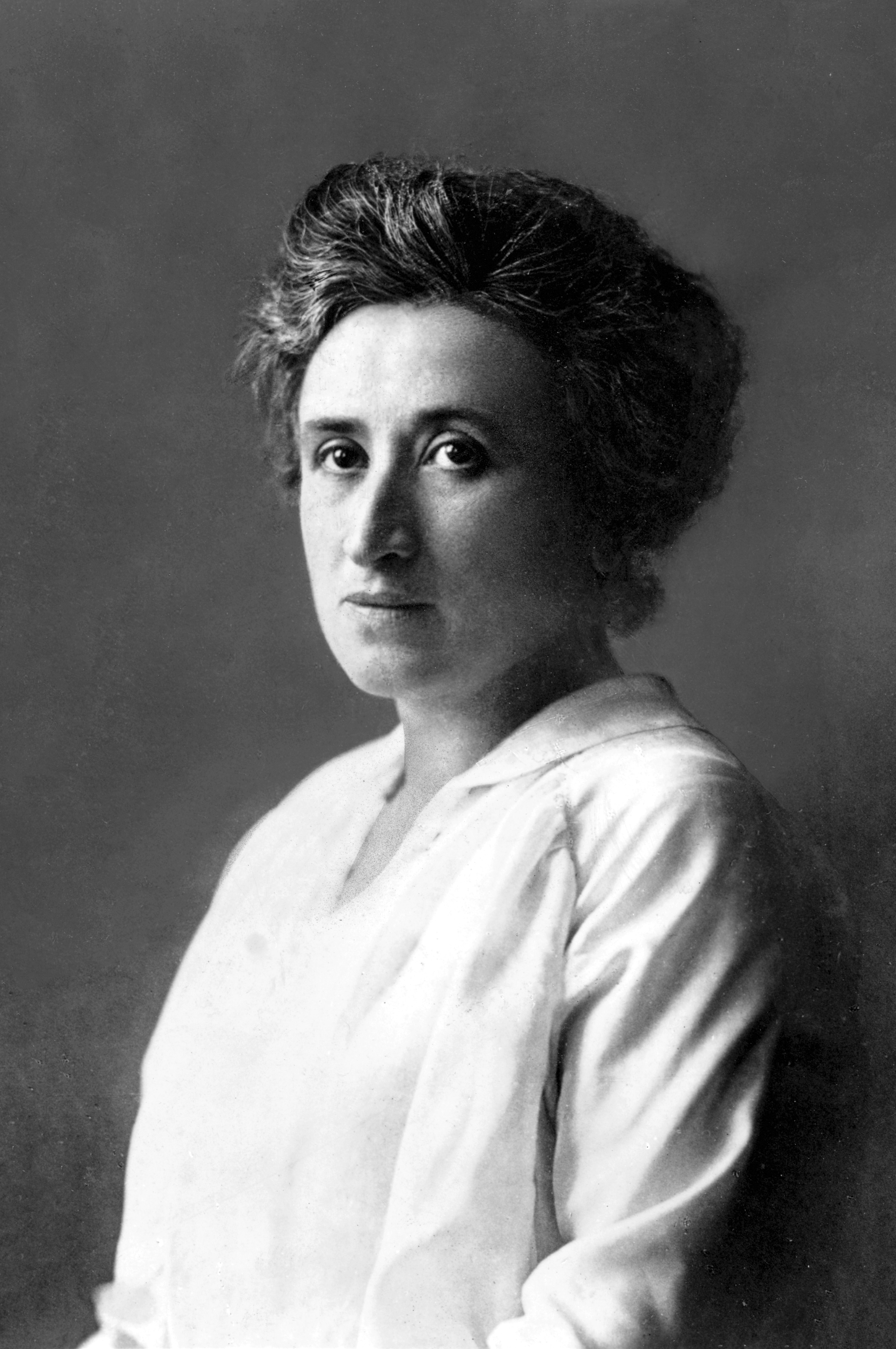
German socialist leader Rosa Luxemburg is assassinated during the Spartacist uprising.

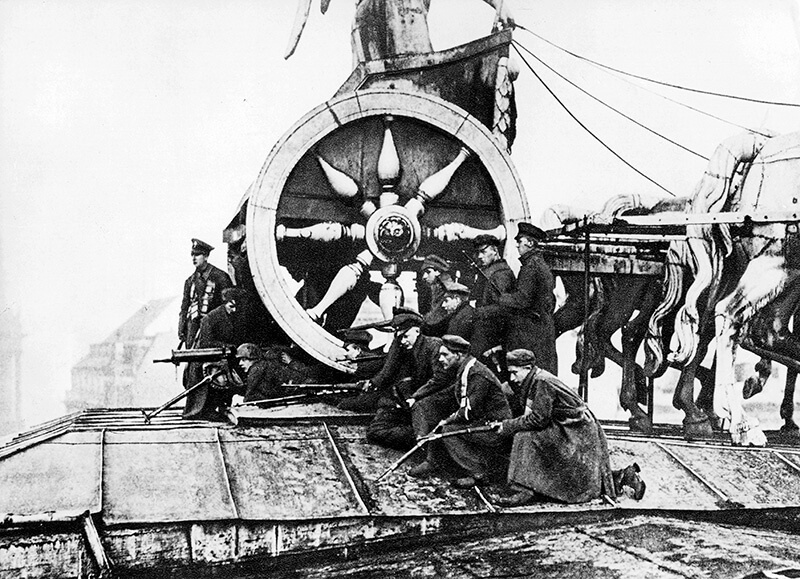
Soldiers on the Brandenburg Gate in Berlin during the Spartacist uprising.

== January 1, 1919 (Wednesday) ==
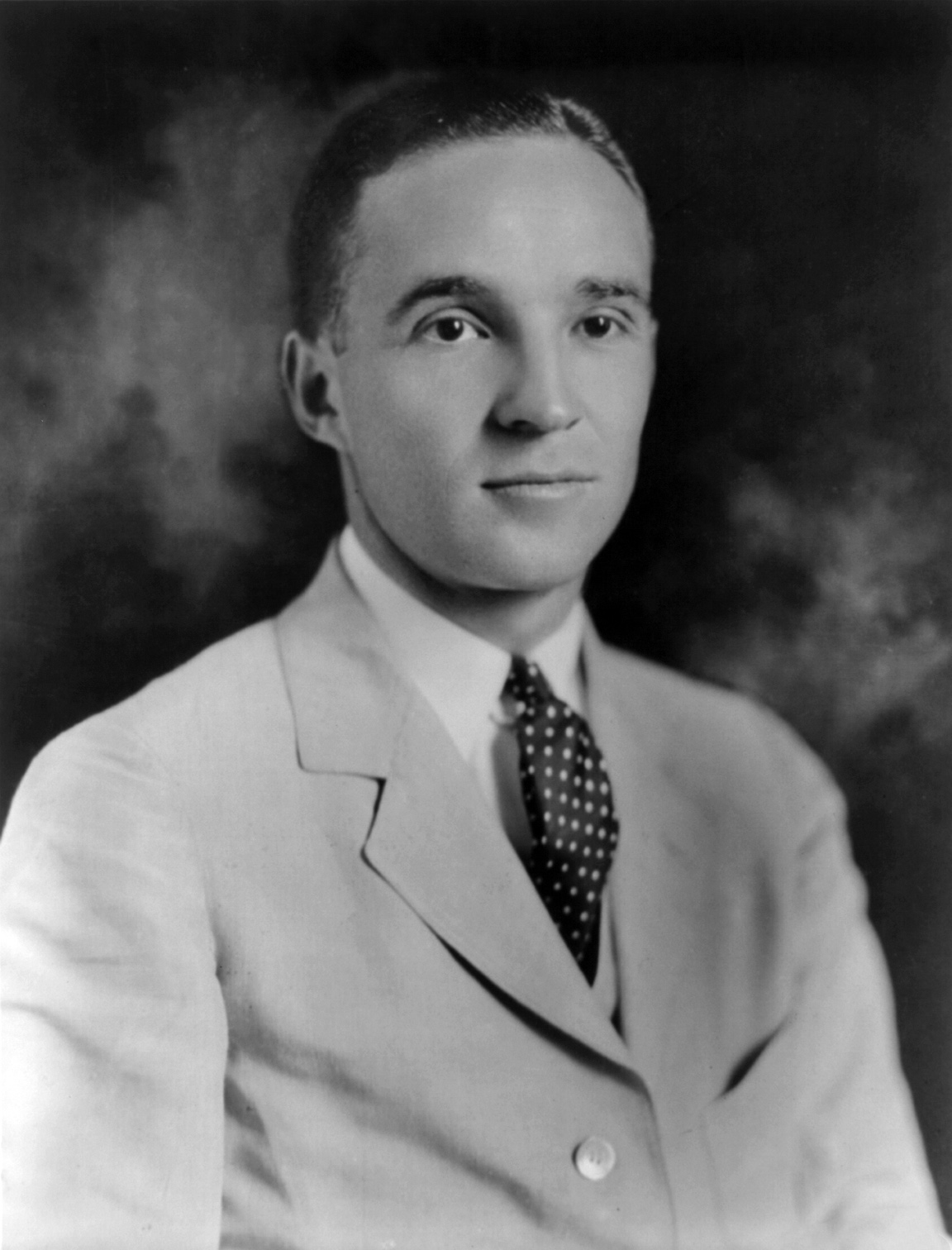
Edsel Ford, new president of the Ford Motor Company

- The Bolsheviks declared a Belarusian soviet republic in Smolensk, Belarus after the Red Army overthrew the Belarusian Democratic Republic the day before.
- Women were granted the right to be candidates in federal elections in Canada.
- Men and women in the Czech area of Czechoslovakia were granted equal voting rights in municipal elections.
- British ocean liner HMY Iolaire sank off the coast of Stornoway, Scotland, killing over 200 passengers and crew.
- Czechoslovak Legions occupied much of the self-proclaimed "free city" of Pressburg (now Bratislava), enforcing its incorporation into the new republic of Czechoslovakia.
- U.S. Navy troopship USAT Northern Pacific ran aground off Fire Island, New York, with about 2,500 soldiers on board. Men were transferred to other ships or onshore over the next three to four days.
- The Royal Yugoslav Army was established as the main land force for the Kingdom of Yugoslavia.
- Thomas Langton Church was elected for the fifth time as Mayor of Toronto in municipal elections.
- Edsel Ford succeeded his father Henry as head of the Ford Motor Company.
- An assembly of Andalusian nationalists in Córdoba, Spain advocated for the end of centralized power in the country and the creation of a Spanish federation in its place.
- The Great Lakes Navy Bluejackets football team of North Chicago, Illinois overthrew defending Rose Bowl champions Mare Island Marines of California 17–0 in the fifth Rose Bowl football game.
- American judge J. Harry Covington and attorney Edward B. Burling founded Covington & Burling in Washington, D.C.
- Bruce Fairchild Barton opened the Barton & Durstine Co. advertising agency in New York City. It would merge with the agency Batten Co. in 1928 to become BBDO.
- In the United Kingdom, the Postmen's Federation, Postal and Telegraph Clerks' Association and Fawcett Association merged to form the Union of Post Office Workers.
- The Franklin Springs Institute was established in Franklin Springs, Georgia as a secondary religious school. In 1939, it received a charter to provide post-secondary education and was remained Emmanuel College (with the high school portion renamed Emmanuel Academy).
- Several rail stations were reopened in the United Kingdom after being closed down during World War I, including stations Bridgend County Borough in Wales, and the Dorking, Reedham, St Leonards stations in England.
- The weekly news magazines Argia was first published, and remains the oldest publication in the Basque language.
- The short-lived Romanian literary magazine Florile Dalbe was published by the cultural society Academia Bârlădeană in Bârlad, Romania.
- The Buckingham Curling Club was established in Buckingham, Quebec.
- Born:
  - Sirr Al-Khatim Al-Khalifa, Sudanese state leader, 5th Prime Minister of Sudan; in Ed Dueim, Anglo-Egyptian Sudan (present-day Sudan) (d. 2006)
  - J. D. Salinger, American writer, author of The Catcher in the Rye and Nine Stories; as Jerome David Salinger, in New York City, United States (d. 2010)
  - Carole Landis, American actress, known for film roles in One Million B.C. and Moon Over Miami; as Frances Lillian Mary Ridste, in Fairchild, Wisconsin, United States (d. 1948, suicide)
  - Rocky Graziano, American boxer, World Middleweight Champion in 1947; as Thomas Rocco Barbella, in New York City, United States (d. 1990)

== January 2, 1919 (Thursday) ==
- Russian Civil War – The Red Army's Caspian-Caucasian Front attacked the White Army under command of Anton Denikin in the North Caucasus but failed to meet their initial objectives on the first day of battle.
- Estonian War of Independence – Finland sent 2,000 volunteer soldiers to assist Estonia against the Red Army.
- The 18th Army of the Imperial German Army was disbanded.
- The Third and Fourth Aero Squadrons of the United States Army Air Service were disbanded, only to be reformed months later to serve American territories in the Pacific Ocean.
- Born:
  - Charles Willeford, American writer, known for his crime novels Cockfighter, Miami Blues, and The Woman Chaser; in Little Rock, Arkansas, United States (d. 1988)
  - Beatrice Hicks, American engineer, first female engineer to work for Western Electric, co-founder and first president of the Society of Women Engineers; in Orange, New Jersey, United States (d. 1979)
- Died: Arthur Gould, 54, Welsh rugby player, fullback for Newport from 1882 to 1898, and the Wales national rugby union team from 1885 to 1897 (b. 1864)

== January 3, 1919 (Friday) ==
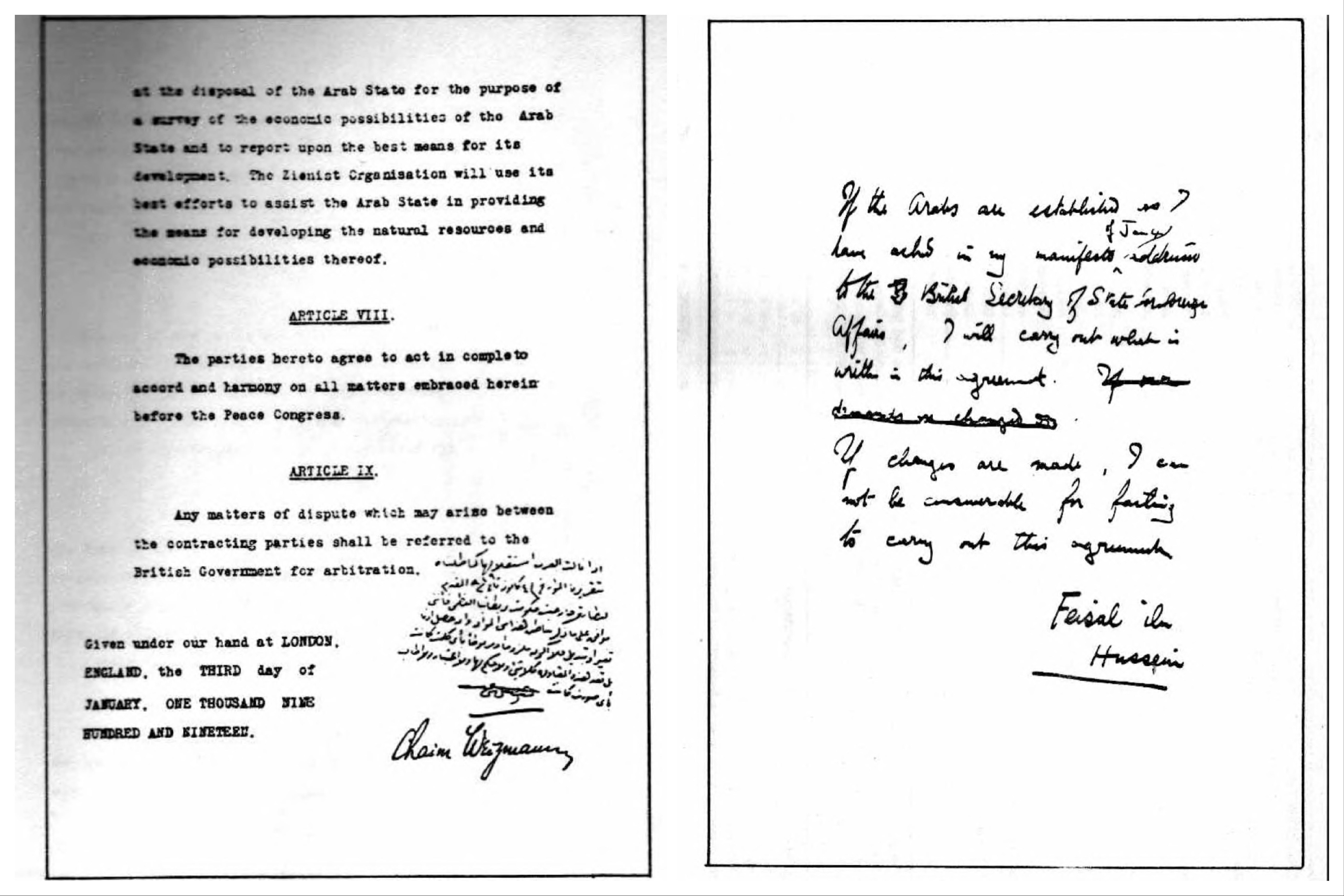
Signature page of the Faisal–Weizmann Agreement, showing Emir Faisal's caveat in Arabic with T. E. Lawrence's appended translation of the caveat (since Faisal could not read or write English).

- An agreement was signed by Emir Faisal (representing the Arab Kingdom of Hejaz) and Zionist leader Chaim Weizmann for Arab–Jewish cooperation in the development of a Jewish homeland in Palestine and an Arab nation in a large part of the Middle East.
- Soldiers threw up a blockade at Folkestone harbour in a successful protest against being returned to France. This leads to the start of mutiny that totaled 5,000 soldiers in Southampton, England. Eventually, it was put down after General Hugh Trenchard threatened lethal force against the mutineers.
- During a strike a metal works plant in Buenos Aires, armed workers fired on police conducting a metal shipment to the plant and fatally wounded one officer.
- Born: Robin Boyd, Australian architect, promoter of modernism in Australia, author of The Australian Ugliness (d. 1971)

== January 4, 1919 (Saturday) ==
- Russian Civil War – The Ukrainian Front army group was formed to fight the Ukrainian People's Republic and supporting White Russian and Allied troops in the region.
- The right-wing National Democracy of Poland allied with disaffected officers of the Polish Army to attempt a coup against the government of Prime Minister Jędrzej Moraczewski and President Józef Piłsudski.
- Wojciech Trąmpczyński became the new president of province of Poznań in Greater Poland as the uprising against Germany spread.
- The German interim government called for the dismissal of Emil Eichhorn, Police Chief of Berlin and a member of the Independent Social Democratic Party of Germany, for refusing to act against demonstrating workers during the Christmas Crisis ten days earlier, sparking the Spartacist uprising the following day.
- Born: Lester L. Wolff, American politician U.S. Representative from New York from 1965 to 1981; in New York City, United States (d. 2021)
- Died: Georg von Hertling, 75, German state leader, 7th Chancellor of Germany (b. 1843)

== January 5, 1919 (Sunday) ==
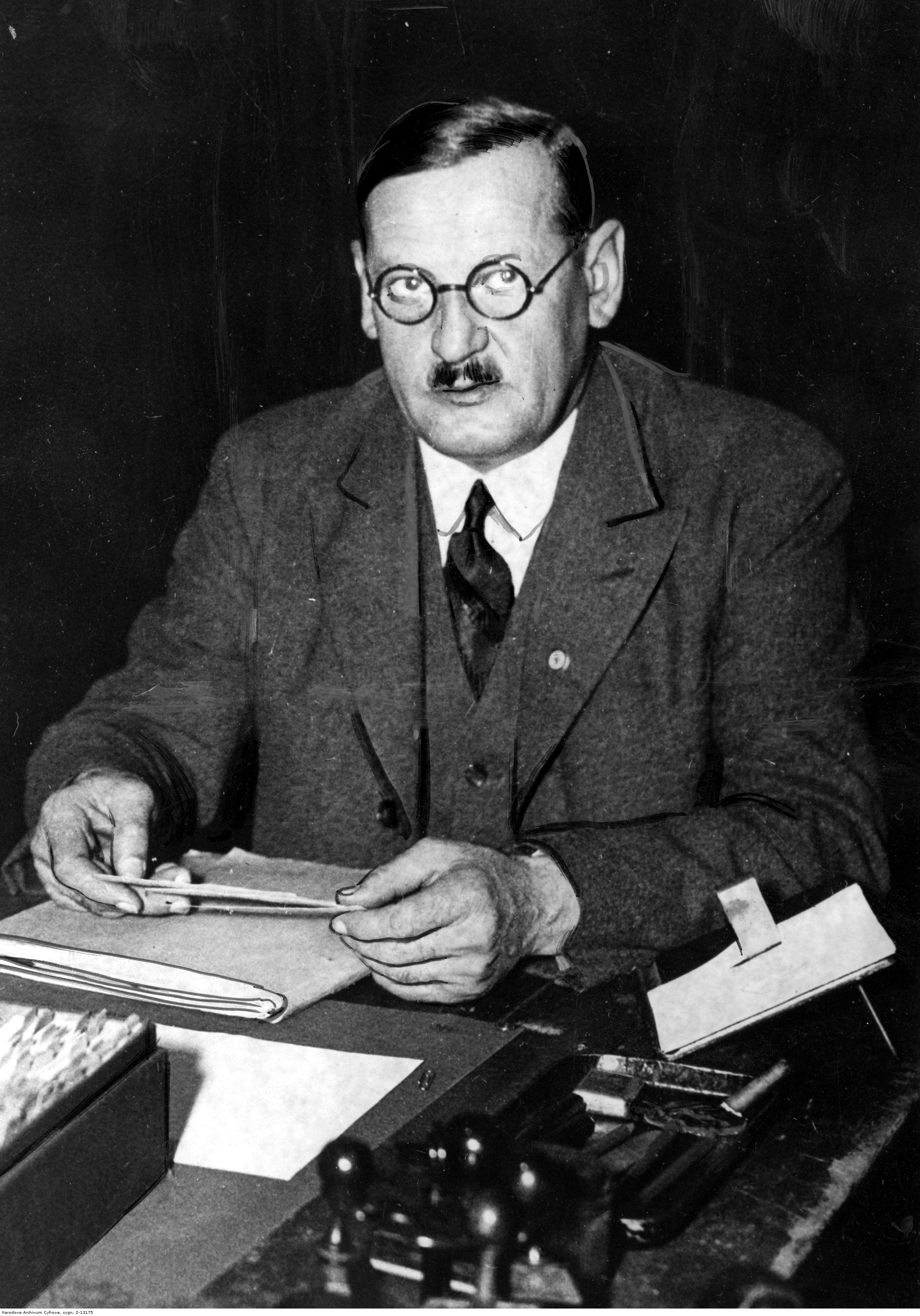
Anton Drexler, leader of the German Workers' Party

- Estonian War of Independence – Estonia increased its fighting force to 13,000 men, allowing it to halt the Red Army advance just 40 km from the Estonian capital of Tallinn.
- Spartacist uprising – The Communist Party of Germany and the Independent Social Democratic Party of Germany called for a demonstration supporting Emil Eichhorn to remain as head of the Berlin police force, but it swelled unexpectedly into a mass demonstration of 200,000 people. Eichhorn proclaimed before the massive crowd: "I got my job from the [German] Revolution, and I shall give it up only to the Revolution." Many demonstrators occupied rail stations and newspapers while party members took control of the main Berlin police station.
- An attempt to overthrow Polish President Józef Piłsudski ended in failure, with most of the participants arrested in Warsaw. Piłsudski forwent any trials against the conspirators in the interest of national unity, and proposed instead to dissolve the current administration under Prime Minister Jędrzej Moraczewski.
- Battle of Ławica – Polish forces in Greater Poland descended on the German-held airport near Ławica and demanded the German garrison stationed at the airfield to surrender.
- The German Workers' Party, predecessor of the Nazi Party, was formed by merging the Committee of Independent Workmen headed by Anton Drexler with the Political Worker's Circle headed by journalist Karl Harrer.
- Football clubs were formed in the following cities:
  - Eyüpspor in Istanbul
  - Quissamã in Quissamã, Brazil
- Born:
  - Frederick Hammersley, American painter, member of the abstract art movement in the United States; in Salt Lake City, United States (d. 2009)
  - Hector Abhayavardhana, Sri Lankan politician, founding member of the Bolshevik–Leninist Party of India, Ceylon and Burma; in Kandy, British Ceylon (present-day Sri Lanka) (d. 2012)
  - Herb Peterson, American food scientist, inventor of the Egg McMuffin for McDonald's; as Herbert Ralph Peterson, in Chicago, United States (d. 2008)

== January 6, 1919 (Monday) ==
- Christmas Uprising – Montenegrin nationalists known as the Greens launched a major assault on Cetinje, Montenegro where the governing Podgorica Assembly was based, resulting in the deaths of some of its members.
- Russian Civil War – Faced with casualties climbing towards 18,000 men lost, White Russian general Alexander Kolchak ordered the Siberian Army to hold their advance and defend the Perm region in Russia they now controlled.
- The Supreme People's Council of Greater Poland was formed to lead an uprising against Germany that still held territory in the western Polish states following World War I.
- Battle of Ławica – Polish forces attacked German troops at the airport near Ławica, Greater Poland after they refused to surrender, and captured the airfield within 20 minutes along with 300 planes and 20 machine guns.
- Spartacist uprising – The German interim government formally removed Emil Eichhorn from public office and ordered defense minister Gustav Noske to mobilize volunteer mercenary units known as Freikorps to curb the demonstrations. As a result, the Communist Party of Germany and the Independent Social Democratic Party of Germany formed an interim revolutionary committee in an attempt to topple the German government.
- The 10th Army of the Imperial German Army was disbanded.
- The world-famous dairy brand Danone was founded in Barcelona, Spain.
- Born: Roy Cochran, American athlete, two-time gold medalist at the 1948 Summer Olympics; as LeRoy Braxton Cochran, in Richton, Mississippi, United States (d. 1981)
- Died:
  - Theodore Roosevelt, 60, 26th President of the United States and posthumous Medal of Honor recipient; died of a pulmonary embolism (b. 1858)
  - Max Heindel, 53, American occultist, founder of the Rosicrucian Fellowship, author of The Rosicrucian Cosmo-Conception (b. 1865)

== January 7, 1919 (Tuesday) ==
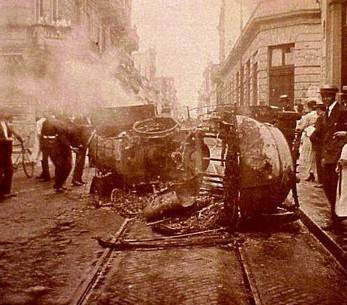
Rioting causes damage in Buenos Aires during Tragic Week.

- Christmas Uprising – Montenegrin unionists with support by the Serbian Army defeated the Greens at Cetinje, Montenegro and ended most of the organized rebellion against forming Yugoslavia, although guerrilla resistance continued for many years.
- Estonian War of Independence – Estonian forces launched a general counteroffensive against the Red Army.
- Spartacist uprising – The revolutionary committee called for a general strike in Berlin. Around 500,000 demonstrators surged into downtown Berlin but did not occupy public buildings as the committee had planned.
- Battle of Ławica – German planes bombed the airfield near Ławica, Greater Poland in retaliation for Polish troops capturing it the previous day.
- Maritime workers in Buenos Aires voted to strike while clashes between police and striking metal workers resulted in five people killed and another 20 wounded. The violent labor unrest marked the beginning of an anarchist uprising Argentina later described as Tragic Week.
- The capital of the soviet republic in Belarus was relocated to Minsk.
- The 11th Army of the Imperial German Army was disbanded.
- New subway stations were added to the IRT Pelham Line in New York City, including Brook Avenue, Cypress Avenue, East 143rd Street, East 149th Street, Hunts Point Avenue, and Longwood Avenue.
- The Norwegian Statistical Association was established.
- Born:
  - Robert Duncan, American poet, member of the San Francisco Renaissance; in Oakland, California, United States (d. 1988)
  - Dorothy Lavinia Brown, American surgeon and politician, first female African American surgeon in Southeastern United States and first to serve in the Tennessee General Assembly; in Philadelphia, United States (d. 2004)
  - George Stephen Morrison, American naval officer, commander of the United States Navy forces during the Gulf of Tonkin incident, recipient of the Navy Distinguished Service Medal, Legion of Merit, Air Medal and Bronze Star Medal; in Rome, Georgia, United States (d. 2008)
- Died:
  - Henry Ware Eliot, 75, American industrialist and philanthropist, lead construction for much of St. Louis and president of the St. Louis Academy of Science, father to poet T. S. Eliot (b. 1843)
  - Hiram Gill, 52, American politician, 27th Mayor of Seattle (b. 1866)

== January 8, 1919 (Wednesday) ==
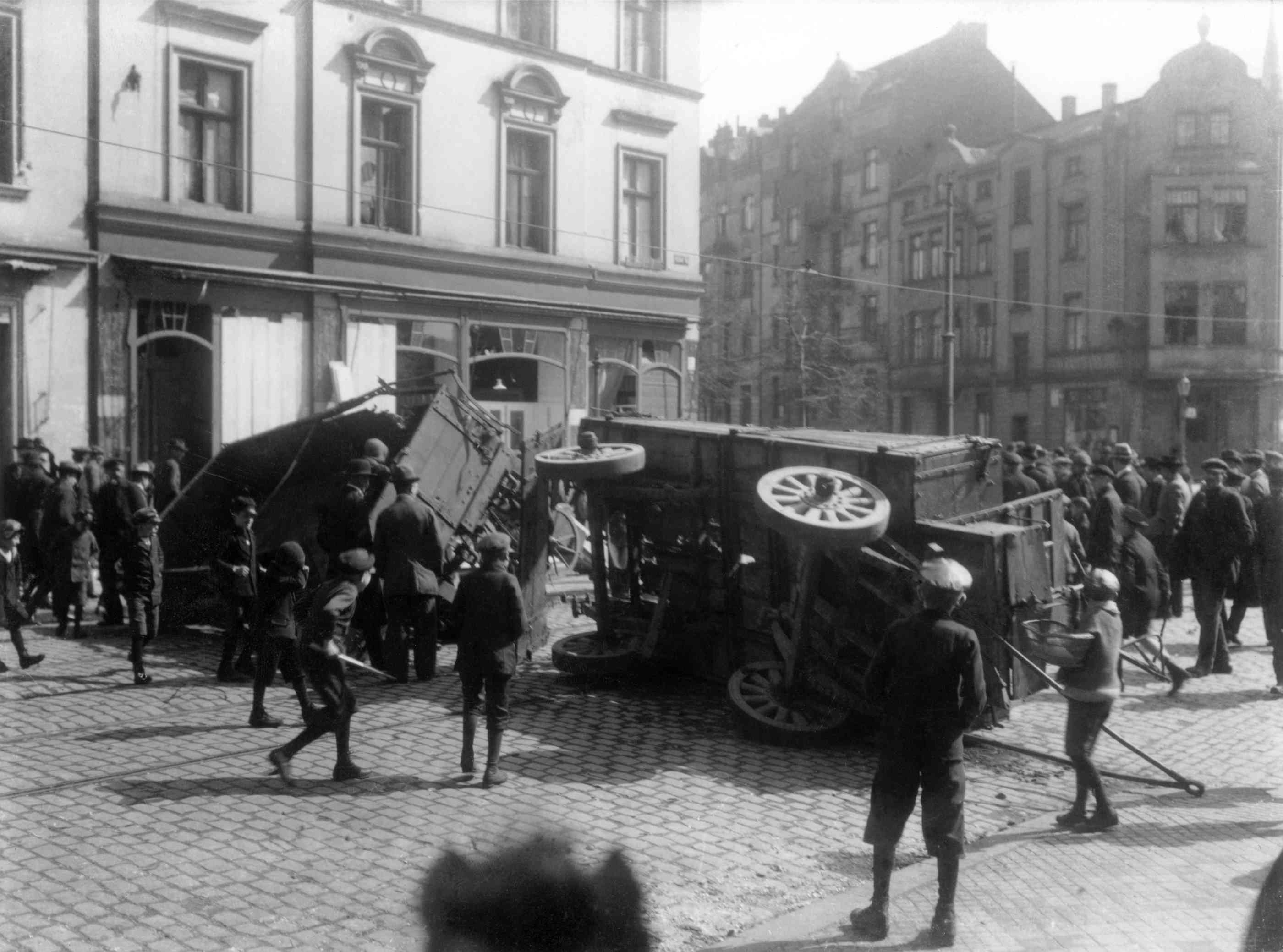
Partisans loyal to the Spartacist uprising set up barricades in Berlin

- Russian Civil War – The Red Army attacked the White Don Army under command of Pyotr Krasnov at Voronezh in south Russia, starting with the capture of Povorino and its railline.
- A national assembly was held in Mediaș, Transylvania where support was declared to unite with Romania.
- The Hutsul Republic was declared after a successful uprising against occupying Hungarian forces in Rakhiv (now part of the western Ukraine).
- Spartacist uprising – The revolutionary committee splintered when the socialist half invited German president Friedrich Ebert to talks. Material was found that the government was behind the mobilization of the Freikorps, causing the communist committee members that were also part of the Spartacus League to withdraw in protest and call on its members to engage in armed combat.
- Tragic Week – A general strike grounded the Buenos Aires waterfront and all ship movements in the harbor.
- The funeral of former U.S. President Theodore Roosevelt was held at Christ Church Oyster Bay in Long Island, New York.
- The Maeda Corporation was established in Japan.
- The American Society of Cinematographers was established in Hollywood.
- Born:
  - Harlan Lewis, American biologist, developed early theories quantum evolution; in Redlands, California, United States (d. 2008)
  - Norberto Yácono, Argentine football player, defender for the Club Atlético River Plate and Club América from 1938 to 1958; in Buenos Aires, Argentina (d. 1985)
- Died:
  - J. Franklin Bell, 62, American army officer, 4th Chief of Staff of the United States Army (b. 1856)
  - Jim O'Rourke, 68, American baseball player, left fielder for various major league teams including the Boston Red Stockings and New York Giants from 1873 to 1904 (b. 1850)

== January 9, 1919 (Thursday) ==
- Spartacist uprising – German president Friedrich Ebert ordered the Freikorps in Berlin to crack down on armed members of the Spartacus League.
- Battle of Ławica – The Polish Air Force launched their first aerial attack against a foreign power, when six planes bombed German military units at the airport near Frankfurt. While only two structures were lost, the destruction was enough to shock German civilians who escaped much of the fighting from World War I. Operations at the airport ceased due to its vulnerability.
- Tragic Week – A general strike grounded the Buenos Aires waterfront and all ship movements in the harbor.
- German battleship Baden arrived at Scapa Flow off the coast of Scotland, the last of the 74 vessels of the High Seas Fleet to be interned by the Royal Navy and wait for their fate to be decided at the upcoming Paris Peace Conference.
- The Guard Battalion was established to defend Tallinn, Estonia.
- A memorial committee was organized for the late U.S. President Theodore Roosevelt, eventually becoming the Theodore Roosevelt Association.
- In Luxembourg group of socialist and liberal deputies, tabled a motion to make Luxembourg a republic. A crowd gathered at the barracks of the Corps of Volunteers, close to the Chamber. Then Émile Servais, a left-wing politician, walked out, addressed the crowd and demanded a republic. The crowd then rushed the Chamber and the deputies called in the Corps of Volunteers but the soldiers refused the orders to disperse the crowd. Part of the deputies then fled the Chamber. The remaining deputies, mainly left-wing, Committee of Public Safety with Servais as its leader. The committee had no public support and the French Army under the command of General de La Tour soon quelled the turmoil.
- Born:
  - William Morris Meredith Jr., American poet, 25th United States Poet Laureate, recipient of the Pulitzer Prize for Poetry for Partial Accounts: New and Selected Poems; in New York City, United States (d. 2007)
  - Micky Axton, American air force officer, one of the first three members of the Women Airforce Service Pilots, first woman to fly a Boeing B-29 Superfortress bomber; in Coffeyville, Kansas, United States (d. 2010)
  - György Bulányi, Hungarian clergy, advocate of the conscientious objector; in Budapest (d. 2010)

== January 10, 1919 (Friday) ==
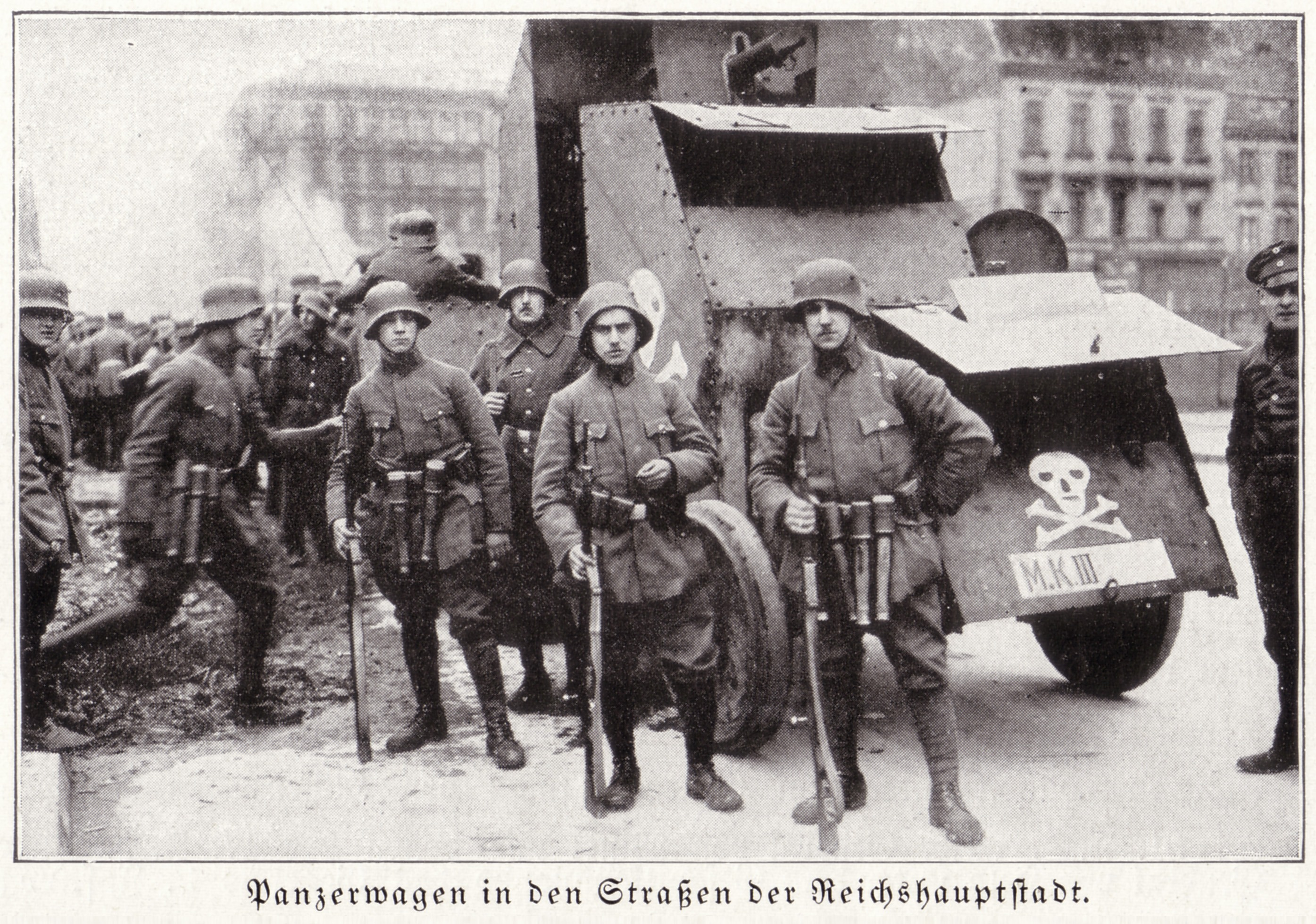
Soldiers with the Freikorps are established to suppress the Spartacist uprising in Berlin.

- Spartacist uprising – The Freikorps attacked Spartacus League supporters throughout in Berlin. As most of the units were composed of World War I veterans who retained most of their military equipment, they were able to successfully put down the uprising in five days. During the fighting, 156 insurgents were killed and hundreds more surrendered. The Freikorps lost 17 soldiers.
- Russian Civil War – The 8th Red Army captured Starobilsk from the White Don Army in south Russia.
- A German Free State was established in the former German Province of Hesse-Nassau during the occupation of the Rhineland by the Allies. It was named for its "bottleneck" appearance on maps as it occupied territory between circular areas controlled by American and French forces. It was abolished in 1923.
- Tragic Week – Riots and sympathy strikes paralyzed Buenos Aires, including rail stations, shipping ports, and food distribution centres. Many anti-anarchist mobs attacked neighborhoods with predominantly Russian Jewish citizens after rumors spread they were behind much of the anarchist violence.
- Winston Churchill was appointed Secretary of State for War and Secretary of State for Air, where he began to work on the Ten Year Rule, or assumption "there would be no great European war for the next five or ten years."
- The Airco aircraft of the Royal Air Force No. 2 Squadron were converted for transporting passengers and mail between London and Paris in support of the upcoming Paris Peace conference.
- The sports club Adelante was established in Reconquista, Santa Fe, Argentina. It is most known for its football team in Torneo Argentino B.
- Born: Janko Bobetko, Croatian army officer, second Chief of the General Staff for Croatia Armed Forces; in Sisak, Kingdom of Yugoslavia (present-day Croatia) (d. 2003)

== January 11, 1919 (Saturday) ==
- Russian Civil War – Heavy fighting around Alagir, Russia resulted in major civilian casualties with thousands more displaced, particularly ethnic Georgians. Vladimir Lenin attributed the civilian casualties to counterrevolutionaries but Georgians reported it to be regional soviet radicals who inflicted much of the violence.
- The first meeting of the Supreme Economic Council was held in Paris.
- Born: Denis Avey, British soldier, member of the 7th Armoured Division during World War II, prisoner of war at the Auschwitz concentration camp, recipient of the British Hero of the Holocaust; in Essex, England (d. 2015)

== January 12, 1919 (Sunday) ==
- Russian Civil War – The newly formed Armed Forces of South Russia launched a major offensive against the Don Army in the Donbas region of Ukraine, but were defeated in May.
- Kurt Eisner and his party, the Independent Social Democratic Party of Germany, were soundly defeated in elections by the conservative Bavarian People's Party. However, he refused to recognize the results and step down as leader of the People's State of Bavaria.
- Tragic Week – Argentine president Hipólito Yrigoyen declared martial law in Buenos Aires, with two cavalry regiments and 300 marines deployed to regain order in the capital city.
- The Republic of Baden elected a new national assembly with the Centre Party dominating the vote ahead of the Social Democratic Party of Germany.
- The Rotary Club of Manila was established during a business luncheon meeting with leading members of the Philippine business community.
- Born: Tom Boardman, British politician, cabinet minister for the Edward Heath administration; in Daventry, England (d. 2003)
- Died: Charles Wyndham, 81, English actor, known his collaborations with the Criterion Theatre in London (b. 1837)

== January 13, 1919 (Monday) ==
- Workers' councils in Berlin voted to end the general strike, ending the Spartacist uprising.
- Tragic Week – Argentine marines successfully thwarted an attempt by anarchists to obtain arms from local police stations in Buenos Aires.
- The Second Army of the Imperial German Army was disbanded.
- The 154th Infantry Regiment of the United States Army was disbanded at Camp Beauregard, Louisiana.
- The Washington National Opera debuted in Washington, D.C., with the performance of The Pirates of Penzance. The company operated until 1936.
- The Yiddish newspaper The Red Truth was first published in Riga, Latvia as the mouthpiece for the Communist Party of Latvia. It ceased publication five months later when the Red Army lost control of Riga.
- Born: Robert Stack, American actor, best known as Eliot Ness in the 1950s television series The Untouchables, nominated for the Academy Award for Best Supporting Actor in Written on the Wind; in Los Angeles, United States (d. 2003)

== January 14, 1919 (Tuesday) ==
- Estonian War of Independence – Estonian forces liberated Tartu from the Red Army.
- Tragic Week – Federal government troops successfully quelled the anarchist uprising in Buenos Aires, with some sources putting the death toll as high as 700 killed and 2,000 injured, while more conservative sources put the toll at 100 killed and 400 injured. The Buenos Aires police force had three officers killed and 78 injured. In the aftermath, an estimated 50,000 people were jailed.
- Jorge Meléndez was acclaimed as President of El Salvador after running as sole candidate in the presidential election.
- The No. 259 Squadron of the Royal Air Force was disbanded.
- The Tamil Evangelical Lutheran Church was established in Tamil Nadu, India.
- French composer Henry Février was granted leave from military service to premiere his opera Gismonda at the Lyric Opera of Chicago, with opera star Mary Garden in the title role. The opera was based on the French play Gismonda by Victorien Sardou.
- Born:
  - Giulio Andreotti, Italian state leader, 41st Prime Minister of Italy; in Rome, Kingdom of Italy (present-day Italy) (d. 2013)
  - Andy Rooney, American journalist, long-running opinion commentator for 60 Minutes; in Albany, New York, United States (d. 2011)
  - Rhena Schweitzer Miller, American activist, director of Hôpital Albert Schweitzer, daughter of Albert Schweitzer; in Strasbourg (d. 2009)
  - Kaifi Azmi, Indian poet, member of the Progressive Writers' Movement; as Athar Husain Rizvi, in Azamgarh district, British India (present-day India) (d. 2002)

== January 15, 1919 (Wednesday) ==
- The French passenger ship Chaouia struck a naval mine and sank in the Strait of Messina with the loss of 476 lives.
- Russian Civil War – The 9th Red Army captured Novokhopyorsk in south Russia from the White Don Army, completing the successful Voronezh–Povorino Operation
- Spartacist uprising – A Freikorps unit under command of Waldemar Pabst arrested Spartacus League leaders Rosa Luxemburg and Karl Liebknecht in Berlin. After questioning, both were beaten and then executed. Luxemburg's body was thrown into the Landwehr Canal and was not discovered until June 1, while Liebknecht's body was delivered anonymously to a morgue.

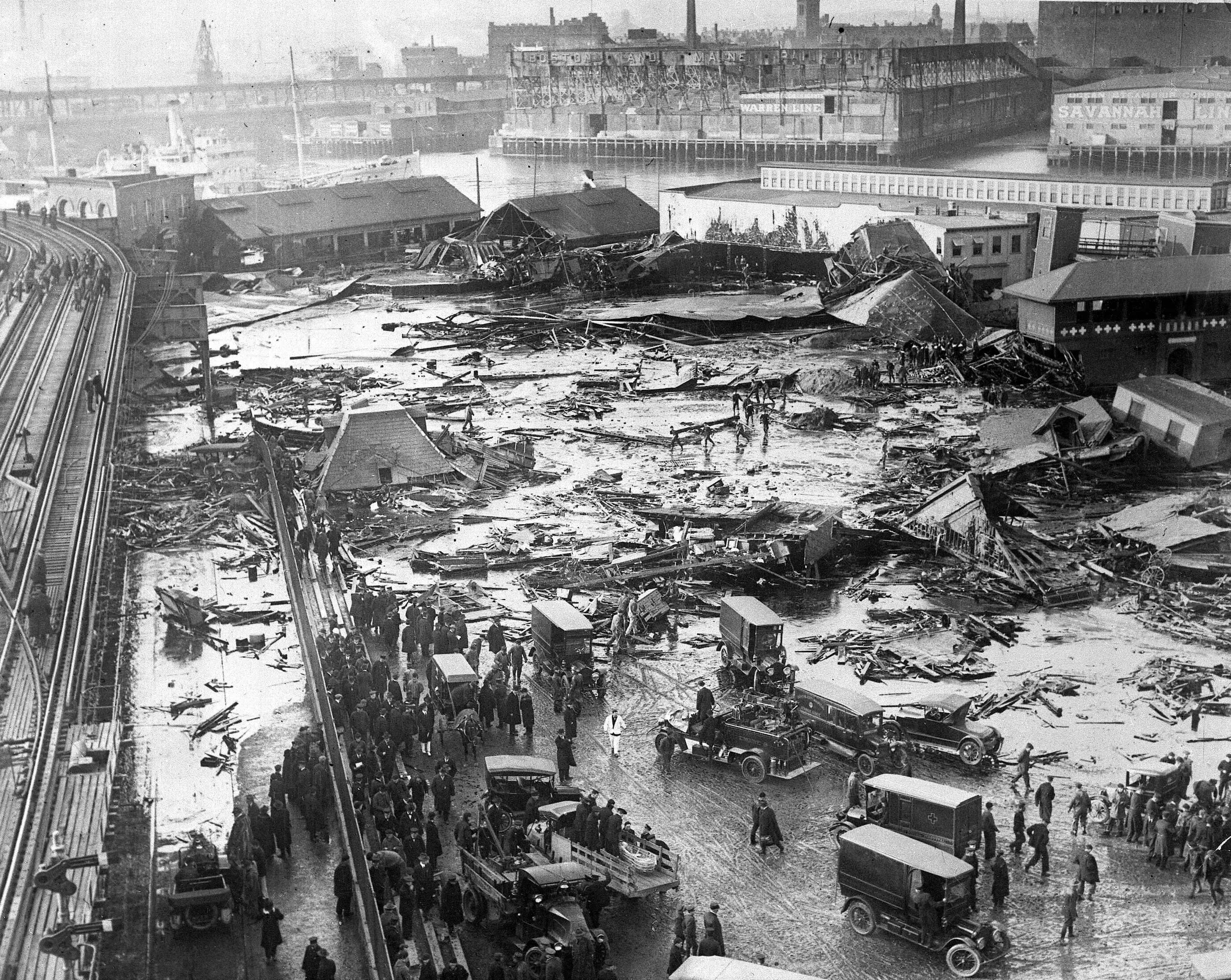
Wreckage in Boston after a large storage tank filled with molasses ruptured.

- A wave of molasses released from an exploding storage tank swept through Boston, killing 21 and injuring 150.
- Brigadier General Norman MacEwen with pilots Major A.C.S. Maclaren and Captain Robert Halley landed in Karachi to completed the first "through-flight" from England to India using a Handley Page aircraft.
- The Islamic school Sumatera Thawalib was established in West Sumatra, Indonesia, and became one of the major promoters of Islamic modernism.
- Boris Karloff made his film debut in the Pearl White action film The Lightning Raider.
- The sports club Tunis was established and became noted for its champion football, handball and volleyball teams. Their home stadium is Stade El Menzah in El Menzah, Tunis.
- Born:
  - George Cadle Price, Belizean state leader, first Prime Minister of Belize; in Belize City, British Honduras (present-day Belize) (d. 2011)
  - Robert Harold Davidson, American marine officer, commander of the 2nd Battalion, 23rd Marines during World War II, recipient of the Silver Star and Bronze Star Medal; in Springfield, Massachusetts, United States (d. 1982)
  - Åke Seyffarth, Swedish speed skater, gold and silver medalist in the 1948 Winter Olympics; as Karl Åke Seyffarth, in Stockholm, Sweden (d. 1998)

== January 16, 1919 (Thursday) ==
- The Eighteenth Amendment to the United States Constitution was ratified to authorize prohibition of alcohol throughout the country. It remained in effect until 1933.
- The nationalist paramilitary Argentine Patriotic League was formed in Buenos Aires after fallout from the Tragic Week. It eventually merged with the Argentine Civic Legion in 1931.
- The Australian municipalities of Shire of Daintree and Shire of Hann merged to form the Shire of Cook in Far North Queensland, Australia.
- Died: Rodrigues Alves, 70, Brazilian state leader, 5th President of Brazil (b. 1848)

== January 17, 1919 (Friday) ==
- Estonian War of Independence – Estonian forces landed at Udria beach in northeastern Estonia in an attempt to force the Red Army out of Narva.
- Forces with the small Hutsul Republic in what is now the western Ukraine clashed with Romanian troops. The Hutsul force was defeated with a loss of 18 to 41 soldiers killed, 39 to 150 wounded and 400 taken prisoner.
- The German air squadron Jagdstaffel 50 of the Luftstreitkräfte was disbanded.
- Born: Wah Kau Kong, American air force officer, first Chinese-American fighter to serve in the United States Air Force, member of the 354th Fighter Group during World War II; in Honolulu, United States (d. 1944, killed in action)
- Died: Arichi Shinanojō, 75, Japanese naval officer, second Chief of the Imperial Japanese Navy General Staff (b. 1843)

== January 18, 1919 (Saturday) ==
- The Paris Peace Conference opened in France, with delegates from 27 nations attending for meetings at the Palace of Versailles.
- Estonian War of Independence – Estonian forces liberated Laagna and Narva, expelling the Red Army from northern Estonia.
- Battle of Kiev – The Red Army launched an offensive to capture Kiev.
- Polish Prime Minister Jędrzej Moraczewski resigned and was replaced by Ignacy Jan Paderewski in the state seat.
- Luigi Sturzo, a priest backed by Pope Benedict, established the Italian People's Party to oppose the Italian Socialist Party, with support from political groups including the Conservative Catholics. The socialist party supported various social reforms, including the foundations for a welfare state, women's suffrage and proportional representation in elections.
- Prince John, the youngest son of King George and Queen Mary, died in his sleep following a severe epileptic seizure at Wood Farm at 5:30 p.m. John, 13, had suffered from epilepsy for many years, which may have contributed to a learning disorder and by modern standards a form of autism. Queen Mary expressed relief as well as sorrow for her son's death in a letter to a close friend: "For him it is a great relief, as his malady was becoming worse as he grew older, & he has thus been spared much suffering. I cannot say how grateful we feel to God for having taken him in such a peaceful way, he just slept quietly into his heavenly home, no pain no struggle, just peace for the poor little troubled spirit which had been a great anxiety to us for many years, ever since he was four years old."
- W. O. Bentley and his brother began to manufacture their own brand of automobile at Cricklewood, London, England. They registered Bentley Motors Ltd. as the name of their company in August.
- The Polish Red Cross was established during a meeting of all the Polish charities that followed the principles of the International Red Cross.

== January 19, 1919 (Sunday) ==
- Russian Civil War – The Red Army launched a counteroffensive to recapture the cities of Kungur and Perm lost to the Siberian Army in Russia.
- The first elections of the Weimar Republic in Germany resulted in the Social Democratic Party of Germany capturing more seats (38%) than any other party in the Weimar National Assembly. It was also the first German election held using proportional representation, with a voting age of 20 (lowered from 25) and allowing women's suffrage, resulting in an 82% voter turnout.
- Portuguese counter-revolutionary Henrique Mitchell de Paiva Cabral Couceiro proclaimed the Monarchy of the North in northern Portugal in an attempt to restore the monarchy, despite having no official sanction from deposed King Manuel.
- Battle of Shenkursk – An Allied force of 1,100 American, British and Canadian and White Russian soldiers fought a Red Army force of 3,000 near Shenkursk, Russia. Shelling followed by a bayonet charge of 1,000 Red Army soldiers was enough to force a post of 50 American and White Russian soldiers to retreat in disorder out of one villages near the city.
- French aviator Jules Védrines claimed a 25,000 franc prize by landing a Caudron aircraft on the roof of a department store in Paris, though he was injured and his aircraft was damaged beyond repair.
- The 17th Army of the Imperial German Army was disbanded.
- The Indian Institute of Technology (ITT BHU) was established as the technical arm of Banaras Hindu University in Varanasi, India.
- The Komfarband of Bielorussia and Lithuania, a short-lived Jewish communist political organization, was formed as an independent of the Communist Party of Byelorussia. However, it was dissolved six months later.
- The Cathedral of Our Lady of Perpetual Help was established in Oklahoma City.
- Ravished Armenia, the first film to depict the Armenian genocide of 1915, was released by First National Pictures. It was adapted from the autobiography by Aurora Mardiganian, a survivor of the genocide who also starred in the film. One portion of the film has survived, with a 24-minute sequence restored in 2009.
- Two football clubs were formed in Germany: Glückauf Brieske-Senftenberg in Senftenberg, and Prueßen Speldorf in Mülheim, before it merged later that year with another club to become Speldorf.
- Born: Simone Melchior, French explorer, first woman to become a scuba diver, wife and business partner of undersea explorer Jacques Cousteau; as Simone Melchior, in Toulon, France (d. 1990)

== January 20, 1919 (Monday) ==
- Estonian War of Independence – Estonian forces defeated Russian forces at Udria, Estonia. In all, Estonian forces advanced 200 km in 11 days, and set up a new front along the Narva River.
- Battle of Shenkursk – Members of the Royal Regiment of Canadian Artillery kept the Red Army at bay near Shenkursk, Russia while much of the retreating American force regrouped.
- The American Expeditionary Forces closed down their military hospitals in Châtel-Guyon, France, when Hospital No. 20 discharged its last patient.
- The Drummoyne Rowing Club was established in Iron Cove, Sydney, Australia.
- The fraternity Rho Pi Phi was established at the Massachusetts College of Pharmacy and Health Sciences.
- Born:
  - Silva Kaputikyan, Armenian poet and activist, known for poems including "A word to my son", advocate for awareness of the Armenian genocide and member of the Karabakh movement; as Sirvard Kaputikyan, in Yerevan, Armenia (d. 2006)
  - Lucille Dumont, Canadian singer, best known for promoting Quebec popular music from the 1930s to the 1960s, recipient of the Order of Canada; in Montreal, Canada (d. 2016)

== January 21, 1919 (Tuesday) ==
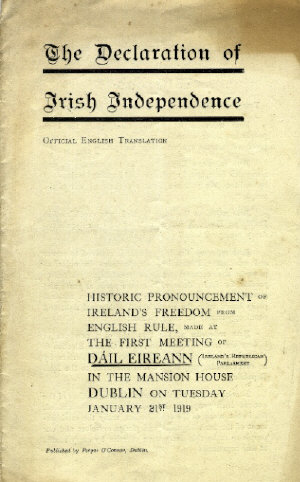
Cover page of the Irish Declaration of Independence

- The Dáil Éireann met for the first time in Mansion House, Dublin. It was composed of Sinn Féin members elected in the United Kingdom 1918 general election who, in accordance with their manifesto, had not taken their seats in the Parliament of the United Kingdom but chose instead to draft a new constitution and declare an independent Irish Republic.
- Two Royal Irish Constabulary officers were killed in an ambush at Soloheadbeg in County Tipperary, Ireland, igniting the Irish War of Independence.
- Russian Civil War – The 9th Red Army captured Uryupinsk in south Russia from the White Don Army, completing the successful Voronezh–Povorino Operation
- Seattle shipyard workers went on strike, leading to a citywide general strike two weeks later.
- The Eighth Army of the Imperial German Army was disbanded.
- German submarine SM UC-40 foundered in the North Sea while en route for formal surrender with the loss of a crew member.
- Born:
  - Eric Brown, British air naval officer, flew the most test flights of all pilots in the Royal Navy, recipient of the Distinguished Service Cross and Air Force Cross; in Leith, Scotland (d. 2016)
  - Jinx Falkenburg, model and actress, known for her radio and television collaborations with husband Tex McCrary and film roles such as Cover Girl; as Eugenia Lincoln Falkenburg, in Barcelona, Spain (d. 2003)
- Died:
  - Gojong, 66, Korean noble, first Emperor of Korea (b. 1852)
  - Ahmed Muhtar Pasha, 79, Turkish state leader, Grand Vizier of the Ottoman Empire under Mehmed V (b. 1839)

== January 22, 1919 (Wednesday) ==
- An agreement was signed between the Ukrainian People's Republic and West Ukrainian People's Republic in Kiev, symbolically uniting them as one Ukraine even though both nations retained separate governments and armed forces.
- Battle of Kiev – The Red Army occupied Nizhyn, Ukraine.
- Battle of Shenkursk – Canadian, American and Russian soldiers retreated a second time out of a village towards Shenkursk, Russia.
- The Romanian Army controlled most of the territory in Transylvania up to the Maros River, which had been declared the demarcation line between Hungary and the Allies.
- The first meeting of the Palestine Arab Congress was held in Jerusalem with Aref al-Dajani presiding as chairman.
- The Turkestan Army was established to defend the Transcaspian region from Russia.
- The No. 244 Squadron of the Royal Air Force disbanded.
- The Irish Republic established the Department of Defence with Richard Mulcahy as minister, Department of Finance with Eoin MacNeill as minister, Department of Foreign Affairs and Trade with George Noble Plunkett as minister, and Department of Justice with Michael Collins as minister.
- The last cartoon of Baron Bean was published by the King Features Syndicate, allowing creator George Herriman to focus on Krazy Kat.
- Born:
  - James Failla, American gangster, member of the Gambino crime family; in New York City, United States (d. 1999)
  - Friedrich Geisshardt, German air force pilot, commander of Jagdgeschwader 26 for the Luftwaffe during World War II, recipient of the Knight's Cross of the Iron Cross; in Sonnefeld, Weimar Republic (present-day Germany) (d. 1943, killed in action)
- Died: Carl Larsson, 65, Swedish painter, member of the Arts and Crafts movement, known for works such as Midvinterblot (b. 1853)

== January 23, 1919 (Thursday) ==
- Polish–Czechoslovak War – A small war broke out between Czechoslovakia and Poland in the disputed region of Cieszyn Silesia (now part of Poland) after Poland refused to withdraw its forces from the region. On the first day of fighting, Czech forces attacked and captured the border cities of Bohumín and Karviná.
- Khotyn Uprising – An uprising broke out in Ukraine city of Khotyn, Bessarabia that was under occupation of Romania, with the rebel force growing to the size of 30,000 armed militia.
- The British government declared County Tipperary a Special Military Area under the Defence of the Realm Act following violence at Soloheadbeg, Ireland.
- Battle of Shenkursk – Russian shelling forced Allies soldiers to retreat a third time into Shenkursk, Russia.
- The "Harbour Riot" broke out in Glasgow between sailors along racial lines.
- The independent Finnish state of North Ingria was established on the Karelian Isthmus where the borders of Finland and Russia meet. It was integrated into Russia in 1920.
- Born:
  - Hans Hass, Austrian biologist, known for pioneering underwater diving to study coral reefs, stingrays and sharks; in Vienna, Republic of German-Austria (present-day Austria) (d. 2013)
  - Ernie Kovacs, American comedian, known for his collaborations with wife Edie Adams in creating the television concept of sketch comedy; in Trenton, New Jersey, United States (d. 1962, killed in a car accident)
  - Bob Paisley, English football player, defender for Liverpool from 1939 and 1954, and manager from 1974 to 1983; in Hetton-le-Hole, England (d. 1996)

== January 24, 1919 (Friday) ==
- Battle of Skoczów – Czech forces forced the Polish Army back to the town of Drogomyśl, Poland.
- Battle of Kiev – The Red Army captured Brovary, Ukraine.
- Battle of Shenkursk – With the Red Army surrounding most of Shenkursk, Russia, Allied Commander General Edmund Ironside ordered the remaining American, Canadian and British force to break out and escape towards Arkhangelsk, Russia.
- The First and 19th Armies of the Imperial German Army were disbanded.
- The Komancza Republic was formally dissolved after Poland repressed attempts for it to unite with the West Ukrainian People's Republic.
- The Unionist Anti-Partition League was established in opposition to the Irish Unionist Alliance due to disagreements overs the partition of Ireland.
- Born:
  - Leon Kirchner, American composer, recipient of the Pulitzer Prize for Music for his composition String Quartet No. 3; in New York City, United States (d. 2009)
  - William Copley, American artist, member of the Surrealism movement in the United States; in New York City, United States (d. 1996)
  - Coleman Francis, American film-maker, known for his low- budget films The Beast of Yucca Flats, The Skydivers and Red Zone Cuba; in Greer County, Oklahoma, United States (d. 1973)

== January 25, 1919 (Saturday) ==
- Paris Peace Conference – A draft proposal to create the League of Nations, produced by British British Foreign Under-Secretary Robert Cecil and South African dignitary Jan Smuts, was approved in Paris. The same day, the Commission of Responsibilities was set up to investigate the background causes of World War I and recommend persecution of individuals for war crimes.
- Battle of Shenkursk – The Allies were able to escape Shenkursk, Russia, despite having transported 100 wounded and losing another 39 men. Despite the Red Army losing 206 men, they had successfully destroyed the offensive capability of the Allies to assist the White Russians in the Russian Civil War.
- The Hotel Pennsylvania opened in Manhattan, New York City and became the world's most popular hotel.
- Born: Edwin Newman, American journalist, best known for his collaborations with NBC on the news shows Meet the Press and Today; in New York City, United States (d. 2010)

== January 26, 1919 (Sunday) ==
- Poland held the first elections since gaining independence, with voter turnout between 70% and 90% allowing a balanced parliament of right, center and left-wing parties despite boycotts from the Communist Party of Poland and the General Jewish Labour Bund in Poland. Five women — Gabriela Balicka-Iwanowska, Jadwiga Dziubińska, Irena Kosmowska, Maria Moczydłowska, and Zofia Moraczewska — were elected to the Polish Parliament.
- The Free State of Prussia elected a new constituent assembly to replace the older Prussian assembly in place since 1849.
- Czech soldiers murdered 20 Polish prisoners of war in the village of Stonava, Czechoslovakia.
- The Catholic National Conservative parties of Moravia and Bohemia merged to form the Czechoslovak People's Party.
- Two pilots with the French Air Force flew a Bréguet airplane across the Mediterranean Sea for the first time, covering 1,609 km (1,000 mi) in a round trip.
- The American Expeditionary Forces closed down their military Hospital No. 238 in Rimaucourt, France, discharging its last patient following the end of World War I.
- Limerick beat Wexford 9-5 and 1–3 at the league final match in Dublin to win the All-Ireland Senior Hurling Championship.
- The Finnish Workers' Sports Federation was established as the governing body for all amateur sports programs in Finland.
- Born:
  - Valentino Mazzola, Italian football player, forward for Venezia and Torino from 1939 to 1949; in Cassano d'Adda, Kingdom of Italy (present-day Italy) (d. 1949, killed in a plane crash)
  - Tom Aherne, Irish football player, member of the Ireland national football team from 1946 to 1953 and Belfast and Luton clubs from 1946 to 1957; in Limerick, Ireland (d. 1999)
  - Bill Nicholson, English football player, midfielder for Tottenham from 1938 to 1955 and the England national football team in 1951; in Scarborough, North Yorkshire, England (d. 2004)
  - Igor Gouzenko, Russian spy, known for defecting to Canada in 1945 with 109 Soviet documents; in Dmitrov, Russian SFSR (present-day Russia) (d. 1982)
- Died: Ismail Qemali, 75, Albanian state leader, first Prime Minister and President of Albania (b. 1844)

== January 27, 1919 (Monday) ==
- Battle of Skoczów – Czech forces occupied Cieszyn Silesia without resistance while Polish forces retreated over the Vistula River.
- Allied forces began to hold off an extended siege by the Red Army at the village of Vystavka, Russia but eventually fell back to Kitsa, Russia by April.
- Serbian soldiers under command of Rudolf Maister fired into a crowd of protesters of German ethnicity in Marburg, Slovenia, killing between 9 and 13 people and wounding another 60 persons. Marburg had formally been part of Austria-Hungary until it dissolved at the end of World War I.
- A general strike was called during a meeting of 3,000 workers at St. Andrew's Halls in Glasgow. The strikers demanded that the working week be reduced to 40 hours to allow more employment for soldiers returning to civilian life after the end of World War I.
- The Waverley Amateur Radio Society was established in Sydney the oldest continuously licensed amateur radio club in Australia.
- Born: Ross Bagdasarian, American musician and actor, creator of Alvin and the Chipmunks; in Fresno, California, United States (d. 1972)
- Died:
  - Endre Ady, 41, Hungarian poet, noted editor and writer for the Hungarian literary journal Nyugat (b. 1877)
  - Nikolai Ivanov, 67, Russian army officer, noted commander of the artillery units during the Battle of Galicia in World War I, recipient of the Order of St. George, Order of Saint Vladimir, Order of Saint Stanislaus, and Order of Saint Anna; died of typhus (b. 1851)

== January 28, 1919 (Tuesday) ==
- Russian Civil War – Despite advances of 20 km to 40 km into White Russian held territory, the Red Army was forced to call off Perm Operation in eastern Russia.
- The Council of People's Commissars of Ukraine was established as the governing body of the Ukrainian Soviet Socialist Republic.
- The Fourth Army of the Imperial German Army was disbanded.
- A firing squad executed Russian Grand Dukes Paul Alexandrovich, Dmitry Konstantinovich, George Mikhailovich, and Nicholas Mikhailovich in Petrograd under orders by the Cheka secret police.
- Masaryk University was established in Brno (then part of Czechoslovakia) and is now the second largest university in the Czech Republic.
- The weekly newspaper Liepāja Trade Unionist was published in Liepāja, Latvia to replace the banned newspaper Darba.
- Born: Gabby Gabreski, American air force officer, commander of the 56th Fighter Group during World War II and the 51st Fighter Wing during the Korean War, recipient of 13 Distinguished Flying Crosses, seven Air Medals, two Silver Stars, and the Distinguished Service Cross; as Franciszek Stanisław Gabryszewski, in Oil City, Pennsylvania, United States (d. 2002)
- Died:
  - Henry Pittock, 82–83, American journalist, publisher of the state newspaper The Oregonian (b. 1835)
  - Eddie Santry, 42, American boxer, World Featherweight Champion from 1899 to 1900 (b. 1876)
  - Franz Mehring, 72, German communist and revolutionary socialist politician (b. 1846)

== January 29, 1919 (Wednesday) ==
- Paris Peace Conference – Polish diplomat Roman Dmowski met with the Supreme War Council of the Allies, asserting Polish rights to the German-occupied territories, including Greater Poland which was embroiled in an uprising against Germany.
- The Sixth Army of the Imperial German Army was disbanded.
- The United States Navy closed its air naval base at Whiddy Island, Ireland following the end of World War I.
- The American Expeditionary Forces closed down their military hospital Bazoilles-sur-Meuse, France, with Hospital No. 116 discharging its last patient following the end of World War I.
- Born:
  - Young-Oak Kim, American army officer, commander of the 31st Infantry Regiment during the Korean War, first American of racial minority to command army units, recipient of the Presidential Medal of Freedom, Distinguished Service Cross, Legion of Honour, Croix de Guerre, two Silver Stars, and the Order of Military Merit; in Los Angeles, United States (d. 2005)
  - Aurelia Browder, American activist, participant in the Montgomery bus boycott; in Montgomery, Alabama, United States (d. 1971)
- Died: Aram Manukian, 39, Armenian revolutionary leader, credited as one of the founders of the First Republic of Armenia; died of typhus (b. 1879)

== January 30, 1919 (Thursday) ==
- Battle of Skoczów – Czech forces broke through the Polish line and forced enemy units back to Skoczów, Poland.
- The strike in Glasgow spread when 40,000 workers from the shipyards around the River Clyde and thousands more from the nearby Lanarkshire and Stirlingshire coal mines joined in the protest, making it the largest strike for Scotland since 1820. The widespread labor dispute forced the British War Cabinet to enact military intervention in Glasgow.
- The soviet council in Minsk declared they were independent from Russia and named the country the Socialist Soviet Republic of Byelorussia.
- The Third, Fifth, and Seventh Armies of the Imperial German Army were disbanded.
- The church and parish of Inmaculado Corazón de María was established in Montevideo.
- The Chinchilla Digger Statue was unveiled by Hamilton Goold-Adams, Governor of Queensland, in Chinchilla, Queensland, Australia as a memorial for the fallen Australian soldiers from World War I.
- Born:
  - Orton Chirwa, Malawian lawyer and activist, major critic of the Hastings Banda regime, husband to Vera Chirwa (d. 1992)
  - Fred Korematsu, American activist, opponent of the internment of Japanese Americans during World War II, recipient of the Presidential Medal of Freedom; in Oakland, California, United States (d. 2005)
  - Arthur MacDonald, Australian army officer, Chief of Army from 1975 to 1977 and Chief of the Defence Force from 1977 to 1979, recipient of the Order of the British Empire and Order of the Bath; in Rockhampton, Australia (d. 1995)
- Died: Sam Steele, 71, Canadian law enforcer and army officer, commander of the North-West Mounted Police Yukon detachment during the Klondike Gold Rush, commander of the Lord Strathcona's Horse Regiment during the Second Boer War, recipient of the Order of the Bath and Order of St Michael and St George; died of influenza (b. 1849)

== January 31, 1919 (Friday) ==
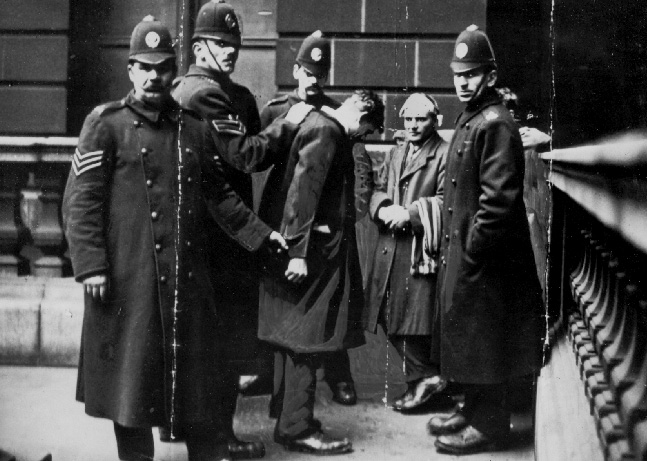
Scottish labour leaders David Kirkwood and Willie Gallacher under arrest by police following a riot in Glasgow.

- Estonian War of Independence – A combined force of 683 Estonian and Finnish soldiers defeated 1,200 Soviet-backed Latvian Riflemen at Paju, Estonia. The Riflemen lost 300 casualties while the Estonian-Finnish force lost 156 including their own commanding officer Julius Kuperjanov, who died from wounds sustained in the battle two days later.
- Polish–Czechoslovak War – Czechoslovakia called off attacking Skoczów, Poland after the Allies pressured them to agree to a cease fire with Poland, ending the conflict.
- The British Army was called in to deal with riots during a mass gathering of 20,000 to 60,000 strikers in George Square, Glasgow. The troops did not arrive until the riot was over. Following the riot, labor leaders William Gallacher, David Kirkwood, and Manny Shinwell were arrested.
- The famed Antarctic exploration ship Nimrod ran aground during a storm off the coast of Norfolk, England, and broke apart, killing 10 of the 12 crew on board.
- The 168th Infantry Brigade of the British Army was disbanded.
- The 12th Infantry Division of the United States Army was disbanded.
- Born:
  - Morteza Motahhari, Iranian religious leader, first head of the Council of the Islamic Revolution; in Fariman, Sublime State of Persia (present-day Iran) (d. 1979, assassinated)
  - Jackie Robinson, American baseball player, first African American major league baseball player, second baseman for the Brooklyn Dodgers from 1947 to 1956, 1955 World Series champion; in Cairo, Georgia, United States (d. 1972)
