= Kitsa =

Kitsa may refer to:

== Places ==
- Kitsa, Estonia, a village in Hiiumaa County in Estonia
- Kitsa, Russia, a railway station classified as a rural locality in Kolsky District of Murmansk Oblast, Russia

== People ==
- Kitsa Escobar, Puerto Rican handball player participating in 2011 Pan American Games
- Kitsa, nickname of Katherine Schuyler Crosby, a sibling of Harry Crosby, American poet and publisher

== See also ==
- Mokraya Kitsa, a rural locality in Kolsky District of Murmansk Oblast, Russia
- Evgenios Kitsas (b. 1982), association football player from Greece
