= Battle of Vystavka =

- Part of the Allied North Russia Intervention during the Russian Civil War
Date	January 27–early March 1919
Location	Vystavka, Arkhangelsk Governorate, Russian SFSR
Result	Bolshevik victory

Belligerents
United States; Canada (Russia) White Army	Bolshevik Russia

The Battle of Vystavka was the defense of the village of Vystavka and several neighboring villages by Allied forces against a series of attacks from the Red Army during the Allied intervention in the Russian Civil War in late January-early March, 1919.

After the defeat in the Battle of Shenkursk, the Allied garrison at Shenkursk first fell back to Shegovary some 25 miles (40 km) downriver and then 25 more miles (40 km) to Vystavka, reaching it on January 27. They prepared defenses and withstood several Red Army attacks over the course of the next several weeks. In early March, after heavy bombardment by Bolsheviks, the Allies fell back 5 more miles (8.0 km) downstream to Kitsa. At this moment the Red Army stopped their offensive on the Vaga River front. It was the final engagement of the Russian Civil War to involve Canadian forces, though clashes continued with other allied countries.

== See also ==
- Siberian Intervention
