= Robert Harold Davidson =

- Born: January 15, 1919; Springfield, Massachusetts, U.S.
- Died: October 10, 1982 (aged 63); Litchfield, Connecticut, U.S.
- Military career
- Allegiance: United States of America
- Branch: United States Marine Corps
- Service years: 1940–1946 (Active Duty); 1946–1958 (Reserve)
- Rank: Colonel
- Commands: Bravo Company OCS; Weapons Company, 2nd Battalion, 23rd Marines, 4th Marine Division; 2nd Battalion, 23rd Marines, 4th Marine Division
- Conflicts: World War II: Battle of Kwajalein; Battle of Saipan; Battle of Tinian; Battle of Iwo Jima
- Awards: Silver Star; Bronze Star; Purple Heart

Robert Harold Davidson (January 15, 1919 – October 10, 1982) was an officer in the United States Marine Corps who was decorated with the Silver Star for his actions as the commanding Officer of a battalion in the Battle of Iwo Jima. At age 24, Davidson was one of the youngest officers in Marine Corps history to be assigned command of a Combat Infantry Battalion. After World War II he was a successful businessman.

== Early years ==
Davidson was born in Springfield, Massachusetts, to Ellis W. Davidson and Mildred F. (née Burgess) Davidson. Ellis Davidson was a newspaperman before World War II. He was the editor of the Springfield, Massachusetts, "Republican." During the war he was a colonel in the Army of the United States (A.U.S.) and served as deputy chief, Review Branch, Bureau of Public Relations in the War Department and subsequently was deputy assistant chief of staff in the Tenth Army on Okinawa. After the war he was an editor of Sales Management Magazine.

Davidson was a graduate of the Milton School, Rye, New York, (1932) and Rye High School (1936). He was the winner of the Lord Jeffery Amherst Scholarship for New York, which paid for four years tuition at Amherst College. Davidson was awarded a Bachelor of Arts degree (cum laude) from Amherst (1940) with majors in biology, chemistry and political science. He was president of the Amherst chapter of Delta Upsilon fraternity.

== Marine Corps service ==
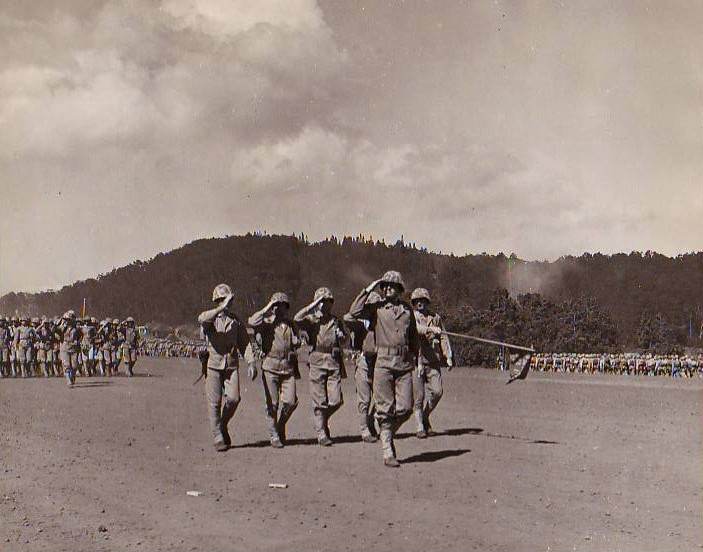
On Maui, Territory of Hawaii January 1945

=== Military education ===
On November 12, 1940, Davidson enlisted in the U.S Marine Corps Reserve as a private. He graduated from Officer Candidates Class, Marine Corps Schools, Quantico, Virginia, and was commissioned as a second lieutenant on February 20, 1941. On May 29, 1941, he graduated from the Reserve Officer's Class, Marine Corps Schools, Quantico. In April 1944, Davidson attended Transport Quartermaster School in Pearl Harbor, Territory of Hawaii, where he received training in commercial and combat ship loading and dock management.

=== Military training assignments ===
Immediately following graduation from the Reserve Officer's Class, Davidson was assigned as a staff officer and instructor at the Marine Corps Schools, Quantico. He instructed and supervised instruction in basic military training and tactics at Officer Candidates Class for approximately 2 1/2 years. He commanded training companies of 150 officer candidates during his last year of duty at Marine Corps Schools. During his assignment Davidson taught basic military tactics and techniques to classes of 50 to 200 officer candidates.

=== Staff and command assignments in the field ===
In July 1943, Davidson was detached as a captain from Marine Corps Schools and assigned to the 4th Marine Division, commanded by Major General (later General) Harry Schmidt, being formed at Camp Pendleton, California. Davidson performed several staff and command roles in 2nd Battalion, 23rd Marines, and served with this unit throughout combat operations against Roi-Namur in the Battle of Kwajalein in the Marshall Islands (January 31 – February 3, 1944).

Davidson was promoted to major and assigned as Plans and Training Officer of the 2nd Battalion, 23rd Marines, and participated in the training phase prior to and during initial combat operations at the Battle of Saipan in the Marianas Islands (June 15 – July, 1944). On the fifth day of Saipan operations, Davidson was appointed battalion executive officer for the remainder of the Saipan battle and served in this capacity during the Battle of Tinian (July 24 – August 1, 1944).

In October 1944, at the age of 25 and as a major, Davidson assumed permanent command of 2nd Battalion, 23rd Marines. He continued in this capacity until the end of the war. As the battalion commander, Davidson was responsible for training, supply, discipline and welfare of a unit of approximately 1,000 men in garrison. As a Landing Force commander, Davidson was responsible for embarking his command abroad 6 naval attack transports. On February 19, 1945, Davidson commanded one of seven battalion landing teams in the initial assault at the Battle of Iwo Jima. Davidson's command was composed of an infantry battalion plus attachments totaling approximately 1,800 men. He continued as battalion commander throughout the Iwo Jima operation.

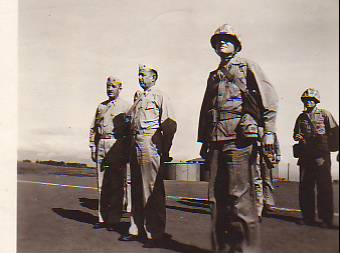
Preparing to inspect the troops of the 2nd Battalion, 23rd Marines

In October and November, 1945, Davidson returned with and deactivated the 2nd Battalion, 23rd Marines, at Camp Pendleton. On November 10, 1945, after 60 months of active military services, Davidson was assigned to terminal leave and returned to his home of record in Washington D.C.

=== Marine Corps career appraisal ===
According to July 30, 1944, edition of The Sunday Star, "Candidate for "ironman" of the outfit is Maj. Robert H. Davidson of 1825 Nineteenth Street, N.W., Washington, D.C.

In charge of troop deployment during the first days on Saipan when furious Jap resistance was met, the 25-year-old major went 84 hours without sleep, eating only cans [sic] of C rations, spooned out to him while he telephoned.

Nerve center of a specialized landing team, he kept its scattered parts united into one fighting force. If any one man was indispensable in those days when victory hung in the balance, Maj. Davidson was."

In a letter to the commandant of the Marine Corps dated August 26, 1945, Colonel L.B. Cresswell CO of the 23rd Marine Regiment notes:

1. "Forwarded. It is regretted that this officer does not desire to transfer to the regular Marine Corps since he is considered preeminently qualified by experience, mentality and temperament for a career in the military service. I consider him to be one of the outstanding officers in the Marine Corps and believe him to be capable at present, of performing the duties of any rank up to and including Lieutenant Colonel.

2. In an official assessment, Major Davidson's experience was described as extensive for an officer of his rank and age, including command of a battalion for ten months and a battalion landing team throughout the Battle of Iwo Jima campaign. The assessment characterized his performance in both combat and training duties as exemplary.

3. Should this officer ever in the future apply for transfer to the regular Marine Corps or for active duty as a reserve officer, it is strongly recommended that such application be approved."

Colonel T. A. Holdahl USMC, CO Marine Garrison Forces in a letter to Colonel E. W. Davidson, A.U.S. dated September 20, 1945 wrote:

"I am sorry that your son is not staying in the service. His is considered to be the outstanding battalion commander in his division. His late regimental commander, Colonel L.B. Cresswell, spoke of him to me in the highest terms on his way through here. As you probably know, his division is coming home as a unit."

=== Volunteer Reserve ===
Davidson was not recalled to active duty during the Korean War. However, he was promoted to lieutenant colonel on January 1, 1951, in the Marine Corps Reserve. Subsequently, he was promoted to colonel on March 1, 1958, and transferred to the Retired List.

=== Dates of rank ===
Insignia	Rank	Dates
	Second Lieutenant	February 20, 1941
	First Lieutenant	February 28, 1942
	Captain	August 7, 1942
	Major	May 12, 1943
	Lieutenant Colonel	January 1, 1951
	Colonel	March 1, 1958

=== Decorations, medals and awards ===
Davidson was awarded the following:

1st Row		Silver Star	Bronze Star
2nd Row	Purple Heart	Navy Presidential Unit Citation w/ 1 star	American Defense Service Medal
3rd Row	American Campaign Medal	Asiatic-Pacific Campaign Medal w/ 3 stars	World War II Victory Medal

== Business career ==
In 1976, Davidson retired as president and chief operating officer of PVO International of Boonton, New Jersey, and San Francisco, California; soybean processors and marketers. He was previously an executive of the General Foods Corporation, administrative vice president of the Economics Laboratory and was president of Fanny Farmer Candy Shops and Anderson-Clayton Foods Inc.

== Personal ==
On August 30, 1947, in New York, New York, Davidson married Anne Breeding Davidson (July 22, 1918 – September 30, 2010), a native of Boston, Massachusetts, and daughter of Edwin Charles Breeding and Flora (née MacLean) Breeding. Robert and Anne Davidson have one daughter, Anne Stowell "Missy" Davidson (February 24, 1949 – ) of Florham Park, New Jersey.

Robert Davidson died suddenly on October 10, 1982, of a coronary occlusion in Charlotte Hungerford Hospital in Torrington, Connecticut. He was interred in East Cemetery in Litchfield, Connecticut. On September 30, 2010, Anne Davidson died at home in Litchfield and following a funeral service in the First Congregational Church; United Church of Christ was also interred in East Cemetery.
