= Liepājas Arodnieks =

Latvian newspaper

- Type: Weekly
- Editor: E. Tomsona
- Founded: 28 January 1919
- Ceased publication: 24 September 1919
- Political alignment: Communist
- Language: Latvian language
- Headquarters: Liepāja

Liepājas Arodnieks ('Liepāja Trade Unionist') was a weekly newspaper published from Liepāja, Latvia in 1919. It was founded as a replacement for Darba, a publication that had been banned. Politically the newspaper opposed the Kārlis Ulmanis government. E. Tomsona served as editor of the newspaper. However, albeit different editors were named in the newspaper the editorial control over the newspaper was managed by the Liepāja City Committee of the Communist Party of Latvia; Jānis Jurjāns, Anna Pērle and Janis Vītols ('Pakalnītis'). The first issue of the newspaper was published on 28 January 1919.

The publication of Liepājas Arodnieks was irregular. The government closed it down after its third issue (published on 4 February 1919). A fourth issue was published on 17 March 1919. Publication was again resumed on 15 June 1919. It did not appear during the Liepāja typesetters' strike of 15–24 July 1919. It was again shut down by the government on 24 September 1919.
