= Mokraya Kitsa =

Mokraya Kitsa Пулозеро
- Inhabited locality
- Interactive map of Mokraya Kitsa
- Location of Mokraya Kitsa Mokraya Kitsa (Murmansk Oblast)
- Coordinates: 68°37′48″N 33°16′20″E
- Country: Russia
- Federal subject: Murmansk Oblast
- Administrative district: Kolsky District
- Territorial okrugSelsoviet: Pushnovsky Territorial Okrug

Population (2010 Census)
  - Total: 40
  - Estimate (2021): 61 (+52.5%)

Municipal status
  - Municipal district: Kolsky Municipal District
  - Urban settlement: Pushnoy Rural Settlement
- Time zone: UTC+3 (MSK)
- Postal code: 184340
- Dialing code: +7 81553
- OKTMO ID: 47605404116

Mokraya Kitsa (Russian: Мокрая Кица) is a rural locality (an inhabited locality) in Pushnovsky Territorial Okrug of Kolsky District of Murmansk Oblast, Russia, located on the Kola Peninsula beyond the Arctic Circle. Population: 40 (2010 Census).
