= Shegovary =

Shegovary Шеговары
- Selo
- Location within Arkhangelsk Oblast Location within Russia
- Coordinates: 62°22′N 42°57′E
- Country: Russia
- Region: Arkhangelsk Oblast
- District: Shenkursky District
- Time zone: UTC+3:00

Shegovary (Russian: Шеговары) is a rural locality (a selo) in Shenkursky District, Arkhangelsk Oblast, Russia. The population was 524 as of 2012. There is 14 streets.

== Geography ==
Shegovary is located on the Vaga River, 45 km north of Shenkursk (the district's administrative centre) by road. Krasnaya Gorka is the nearest rural locality.
