= Battle of Skoczów =

- Part of the Polish–Czechoslovak War
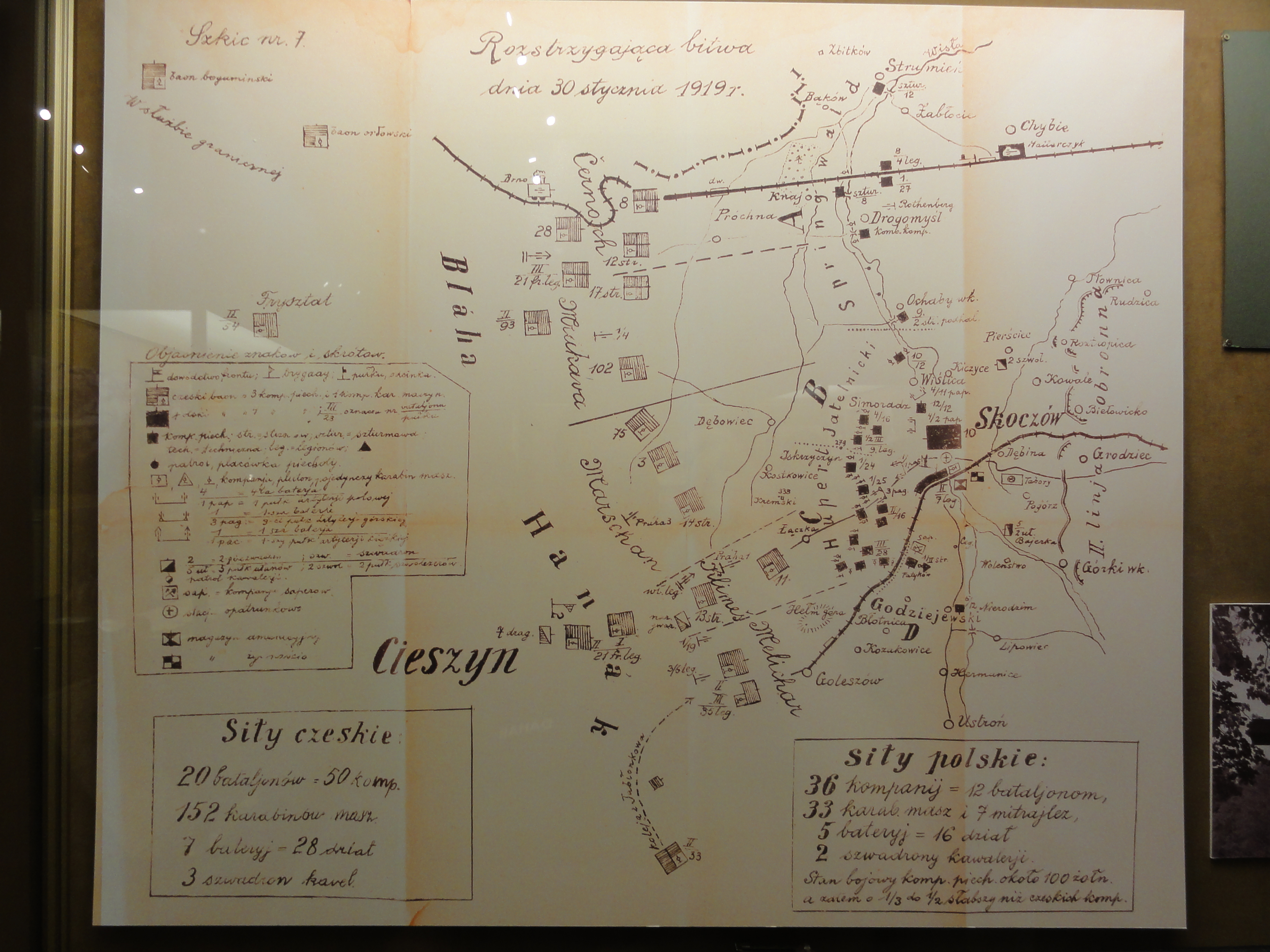
- Map of the battle
Date	January 28–30, 1919
Location	Near Skoczów, Poland
Result	Indecisive: Czechoslovak forces withdrew following pressure from Entente

Belligerents
Czechoslovakia	Poland

Commanders and leaders
Josef Šnejdárek	Franciszek Latinik

Strength
More than 10,000 soldiers (including 20 battalions of infantry and 3 squadrons of cavalry); 28 machine guns 1 armoured train	3,000–4,000 soldiers (including 6 battalions of infantry and 2 squadrons of cavalry); 1 piece of artillery 1 armoured train

Casualties and losses
Unknown	18 killed

The Battle of Skoczów took place in late January 1919, during the Polish–Czechoslovak War. Czechoslovak units were halted only under pressure from the Entente. The result of the war was to set a new demarcation line, which extended the territory controlled by Czechoslovakia. The battle was stopped by the Czechoslovak Minister of Defense near the town of Skoczów, Poland and a ceasefire was signed.

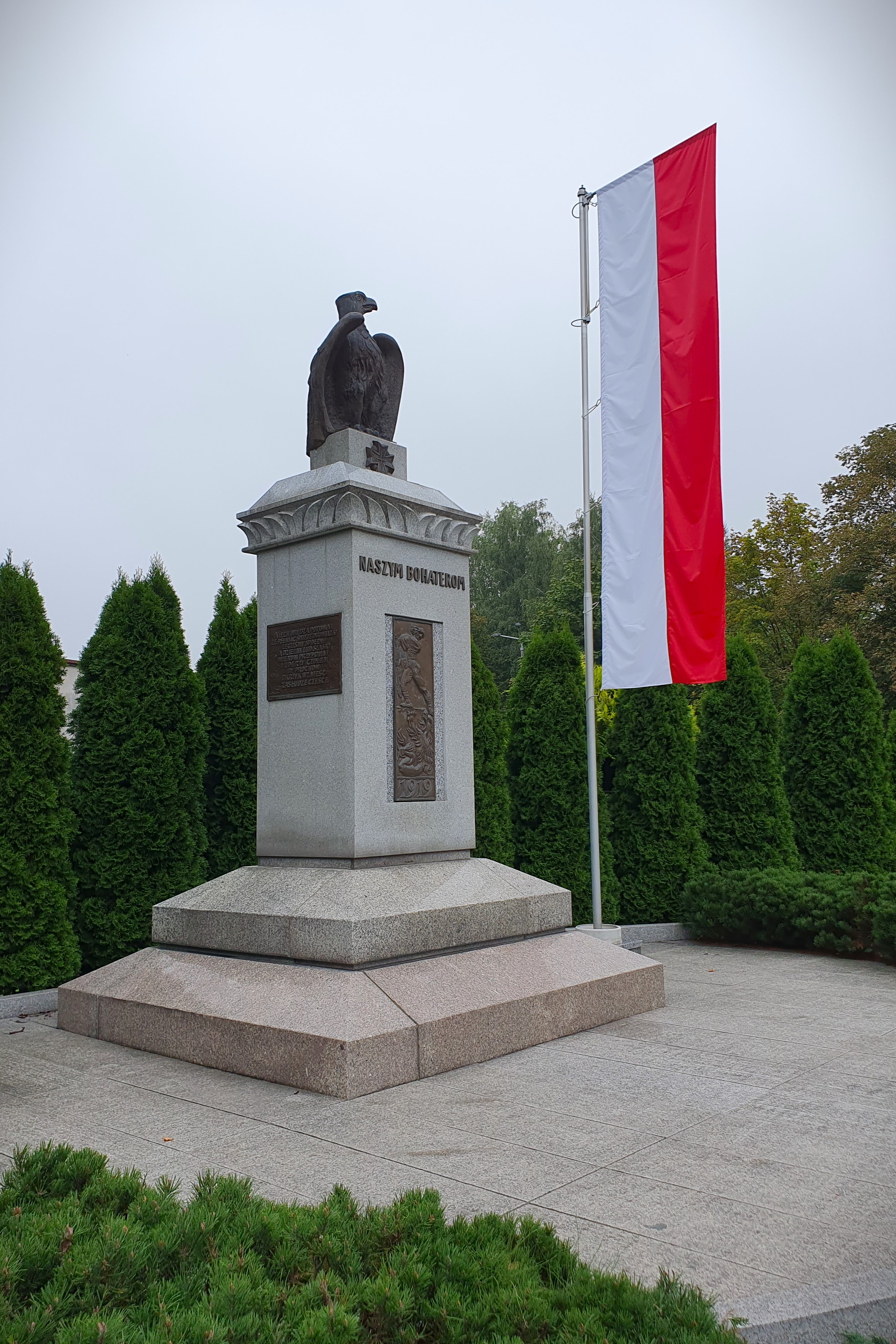
Monument «To Our Heroes» in Skoczów

The Czechoslovak offensive in the Duchy of Teschen began on January 23. Due to the ongoing Polish–Ukrainian War and Greater Poland Uprising, and the budding Polish–Soviet War (which erupted in February 1919), the bulk of the Polish Armed Forces was located in other provinces of the country. As a result of the Czechoslovak offensive, weak Polish forces near Cieszyn were forced to retreat east- and northwards. To avoid encirclement, on 26 January, the Polish forces evacuated Cieszyn. Colonel Franciszek Latinik, who commanded Polish forces in the area, created a defensive line along the Vistula, from Strumień in the north to Ustroń in the south. Above all, Latinik wanted to prevent the enemy from breaking through to Bielsko-Biała and Żywiec.

On 23 January 1919 at 11:00 in Cieszyn Silesia, at the request of the Czechoslovak party, Latinik and Czechoslovak officer Josef Šnejdárek met with a group of officers, consisting of English, French, Italian and U.S. representatives. The Polish side was given an ultimatum to evacuate the area to the Biała River in less than two hours. After the expiry of this period the Czechoslovak army started its operations at 13:00 following its operational guidelines to seize Bohumín and Karviná. The Czechoslovak army moved forward, and took Bohumín (at 16:00), Orlová and Karviná. Polish troops retreated to the river Vistula. On the next day, first clashes took place near Skoczów. After a fierce defense, the Poles withdrew to Ustroń and Drogomyśl. On January 30, the Czechoslovaks broke through Polish lines near Strumień. Czechoslovak officer Josef Šnejdárek received the order to cross the Vistula and secure the railway line between Bohumín and Jablunkov. They crossed the river and the Polish troops retreated to Skoczów, where the front line was stalled. Further Czechoslovak reinforcements arrived, which gave Šnejdárek an advantage over the Polish units. The Czechoslovak army prepared for an attack on Skoczów on the assumption that there had been a collapse of the Polish defenses.

On 31 January 1919, because of pressure from the Triple Entente representatives, the attack on Skoczów was cancelled, and the Czechoslovak army ceased fighting. The Czechoslovak army withdrew to the new Green Line, established by the International Commission Agreement on the basis of the Czechoslovak–Polish Treaty, concluded on 3 February 1919 in Paris.

The Battle of Skoczów is commemorated on the Tomb of the Unknown Soldier, Warsaw, with the inscription "CIESZYN - SKOCZÓW 23 - 26 I 1919".

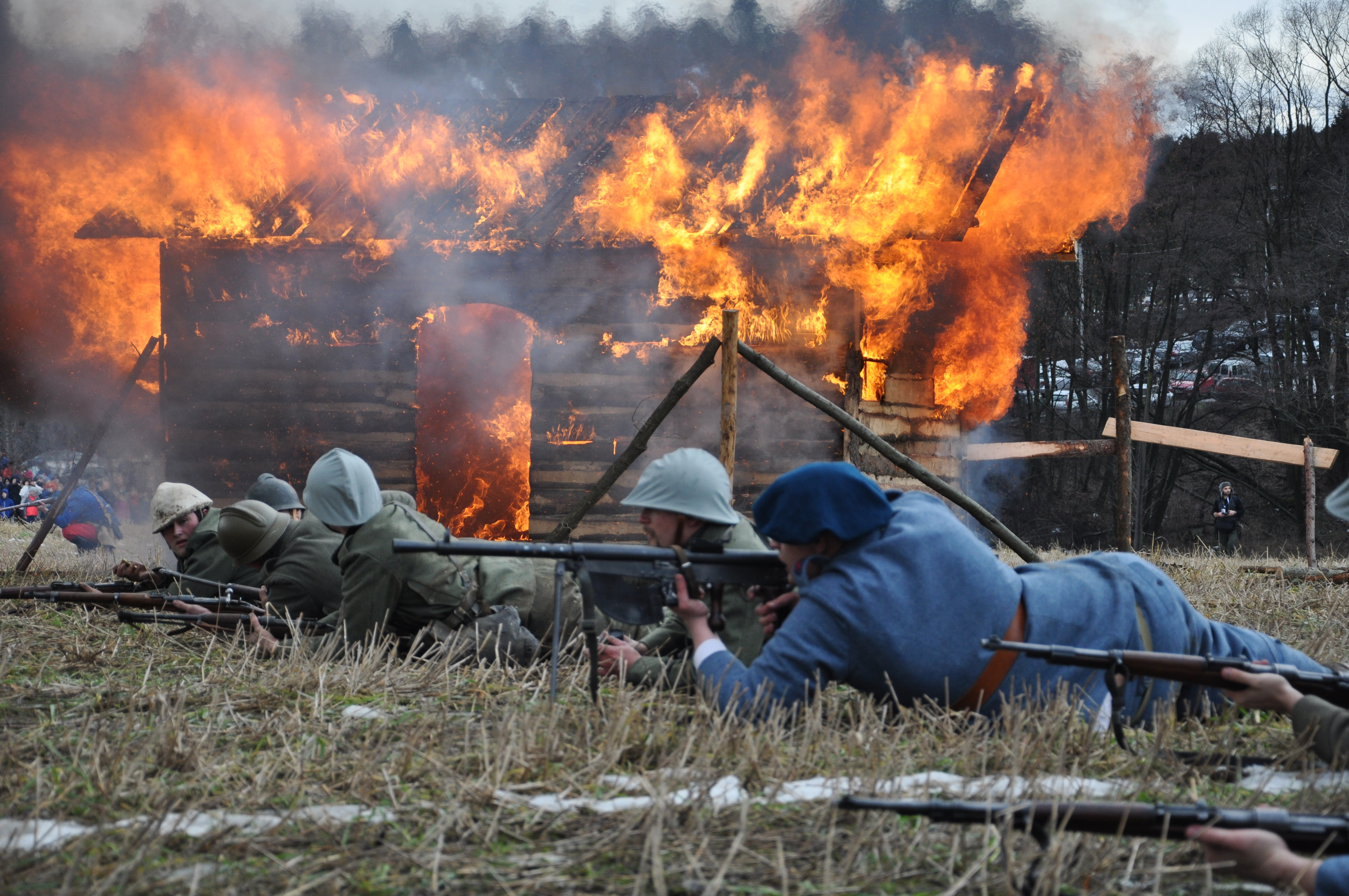
Reconstruction of the battle of Skoczów 2.02.2019

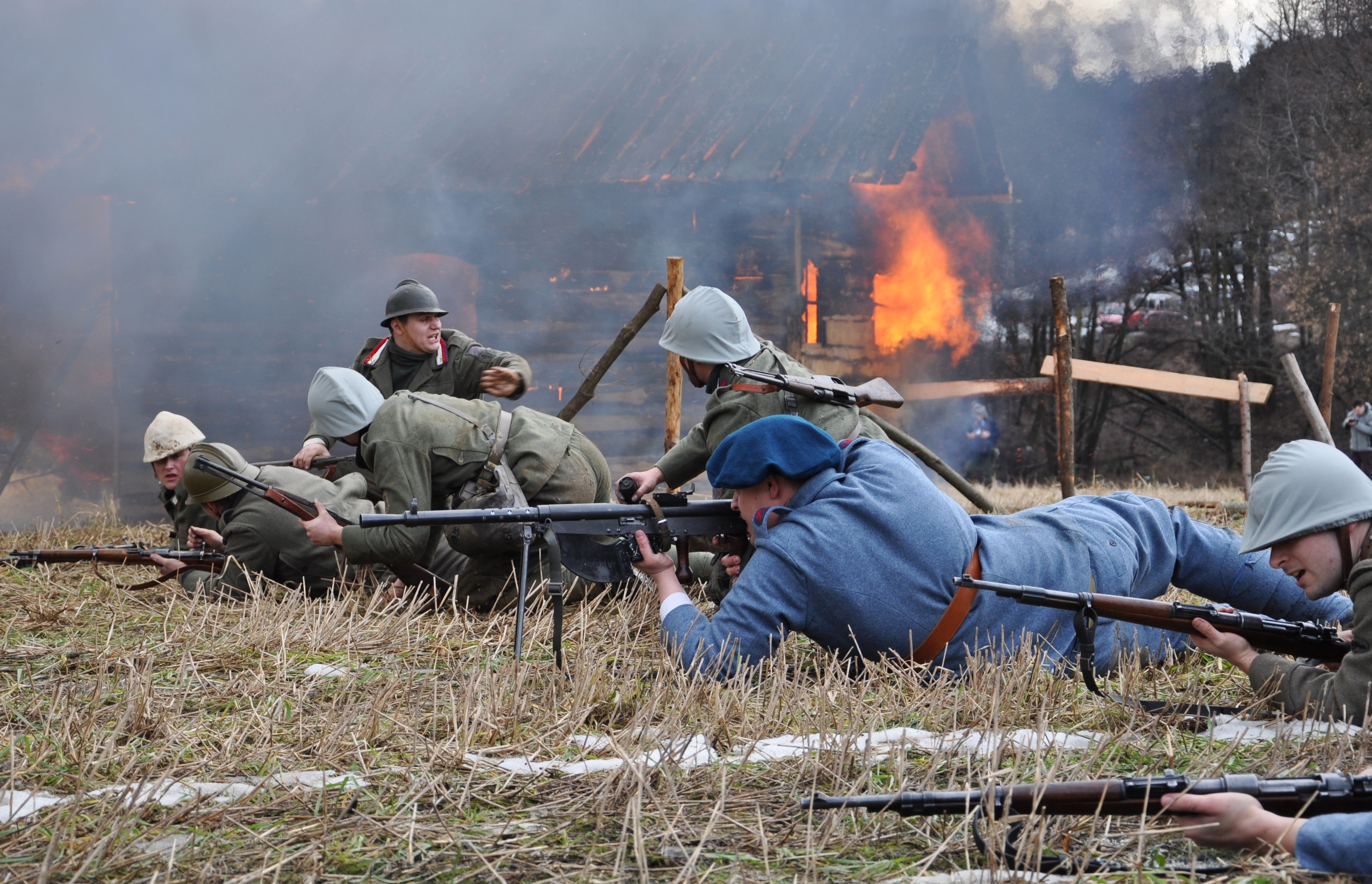
Reconstruction of the battle of Skoczów 2.02.2019

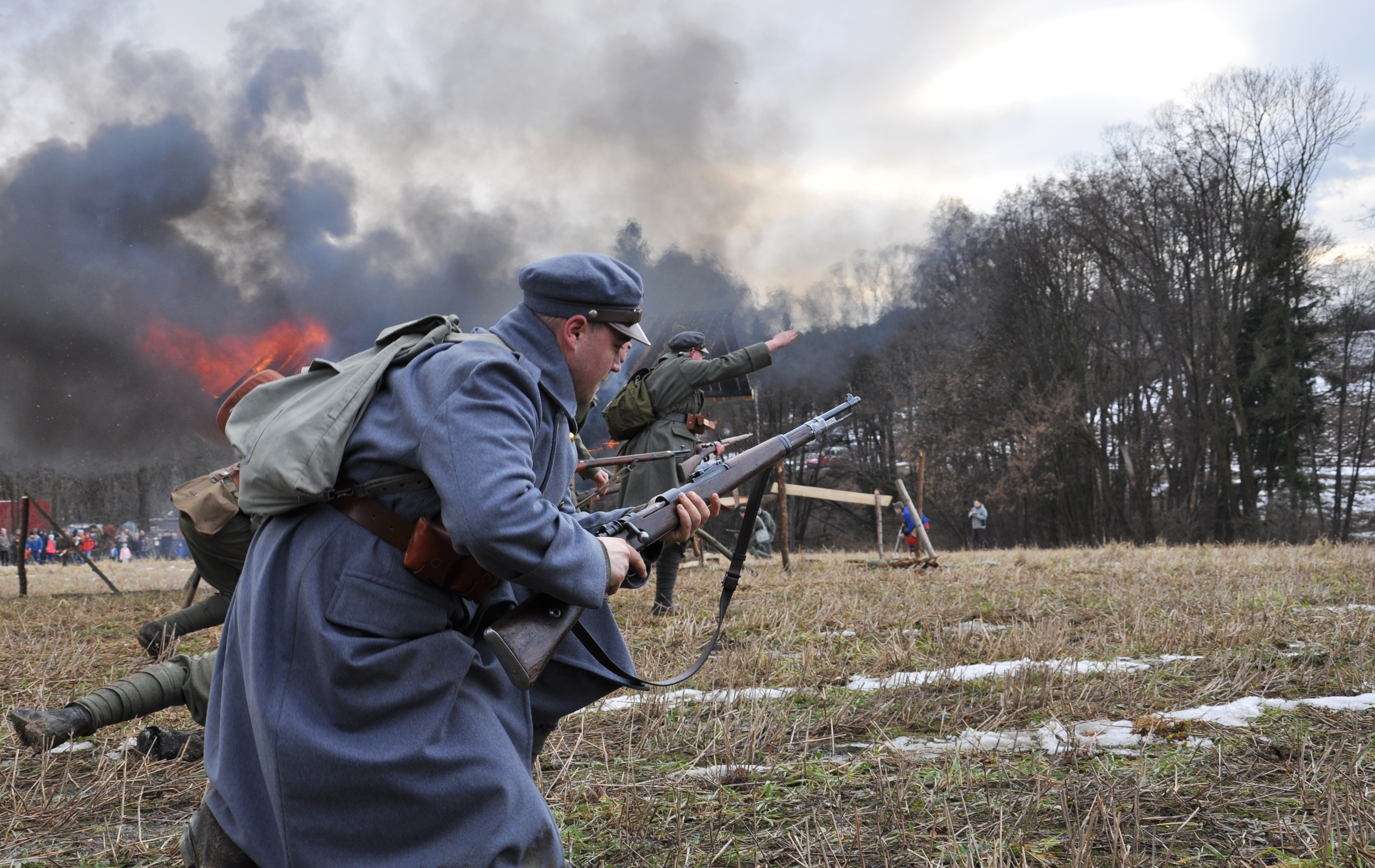
Reconstruction of the battle of Skoczów 2.02.2019

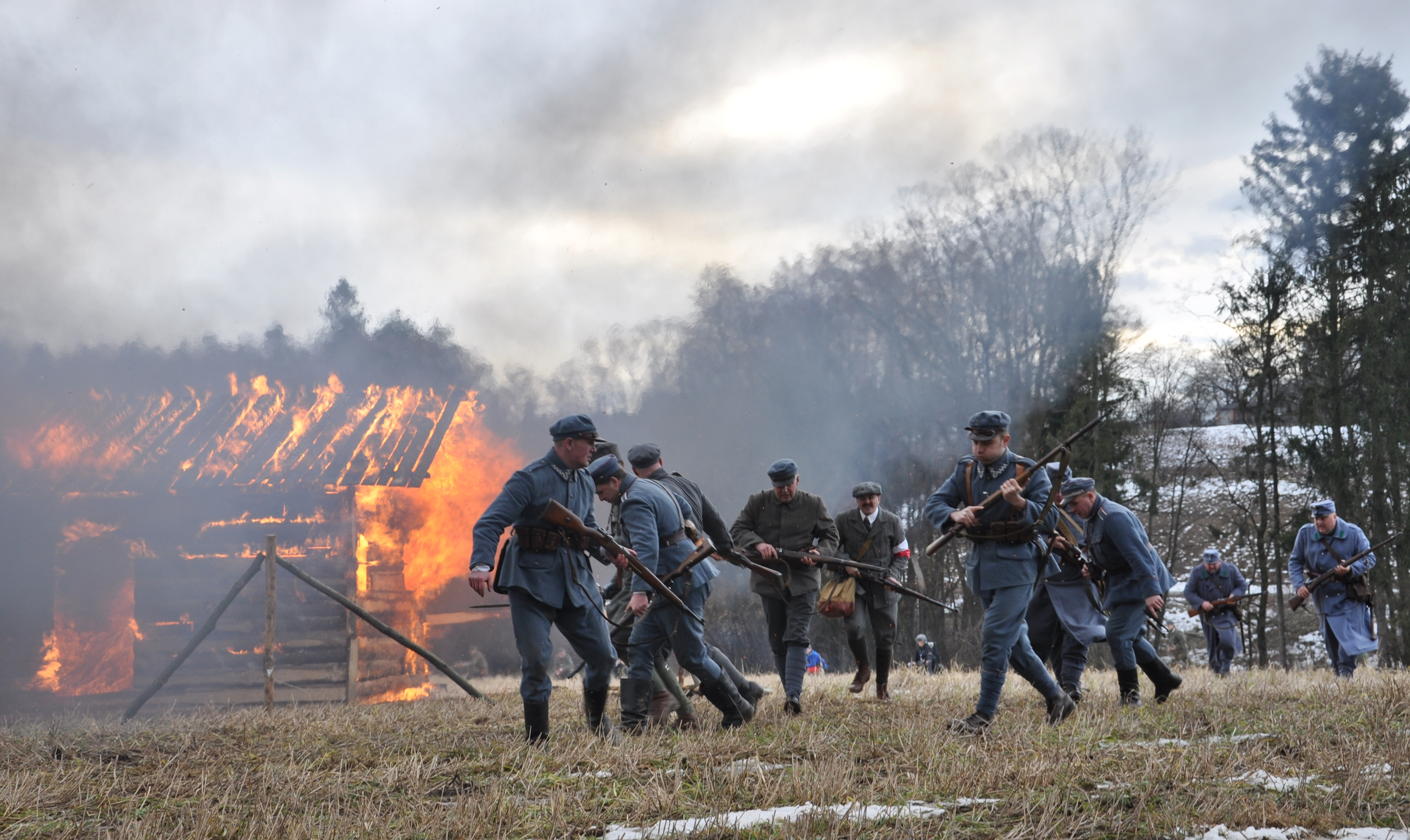
Reconstruction of the battle of Skoczów 2.02.2019

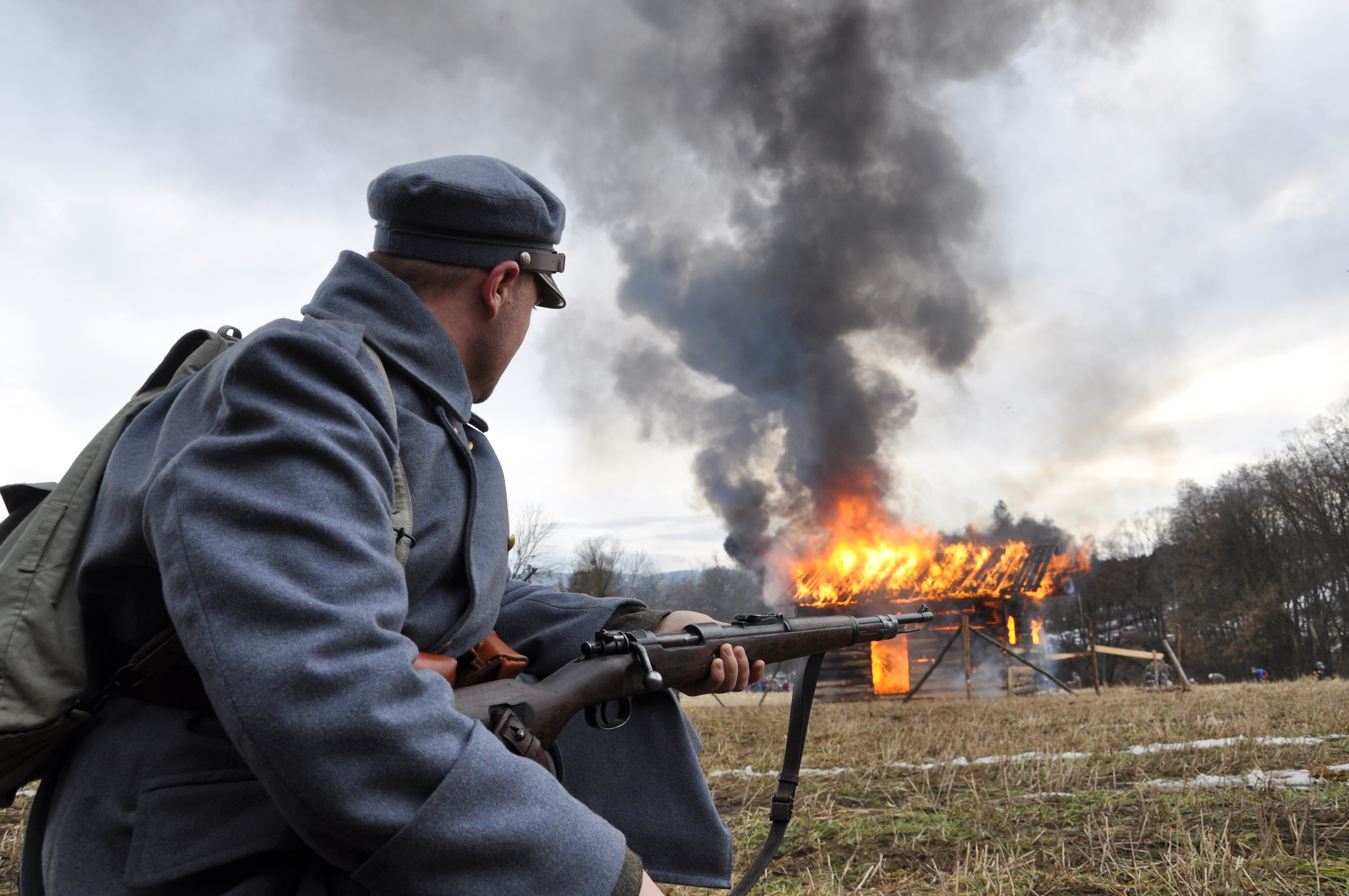
Reconstruction of the battle of Skoczów 2.02.2019

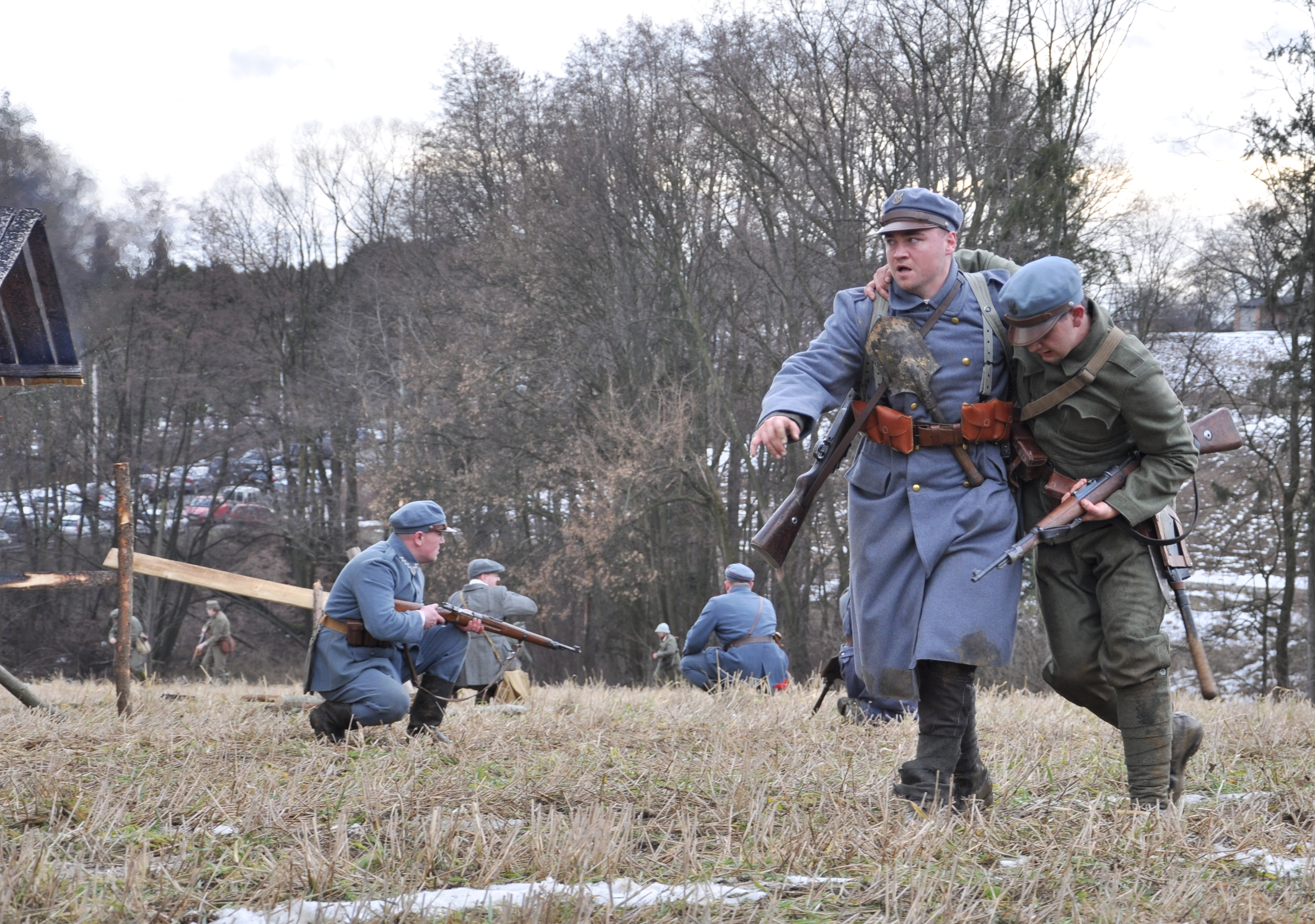
Reconstruction of the battle of Skoczów 2.02.2019

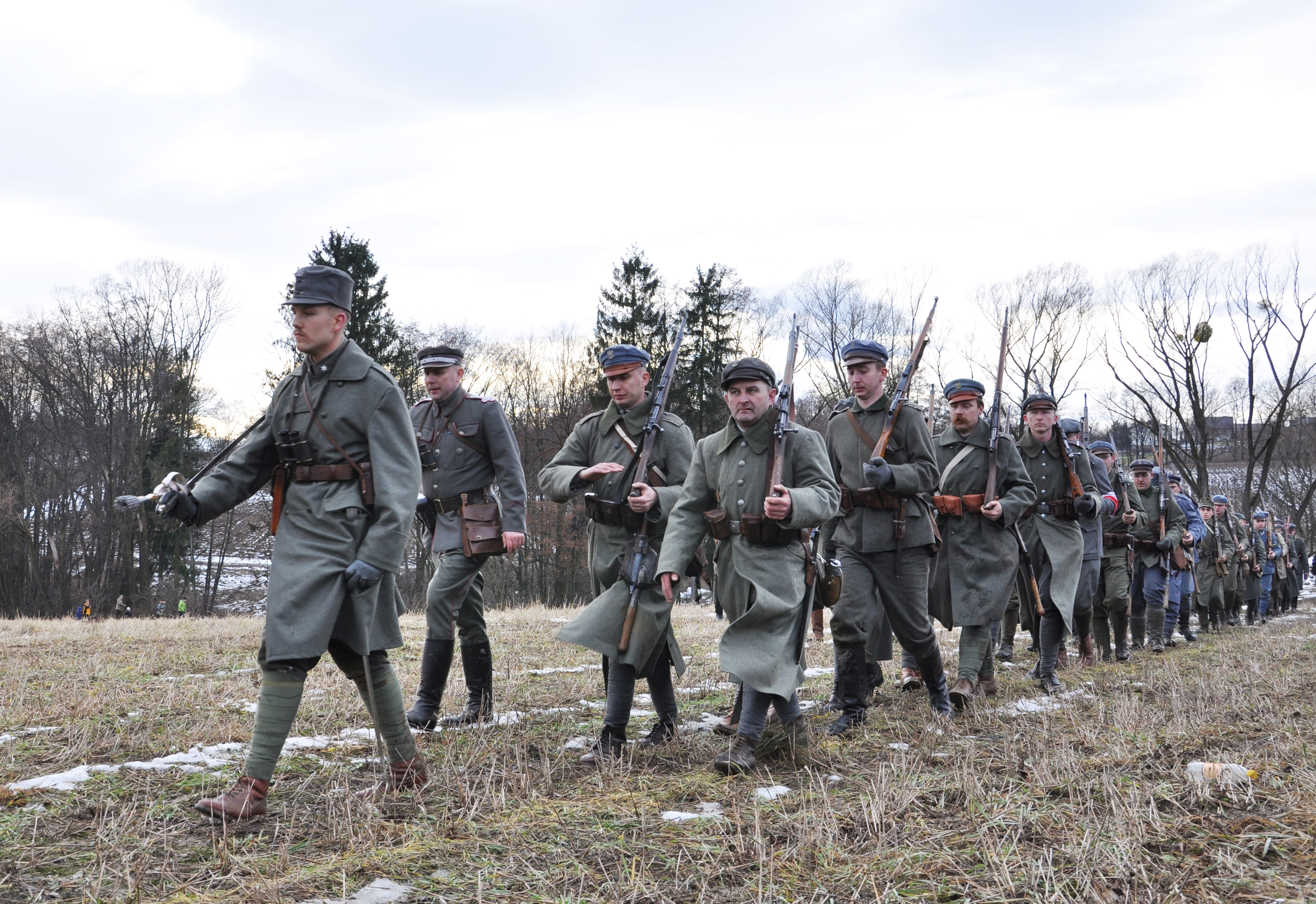
Reconstruction of the battle of Skoczów 2.02.2019

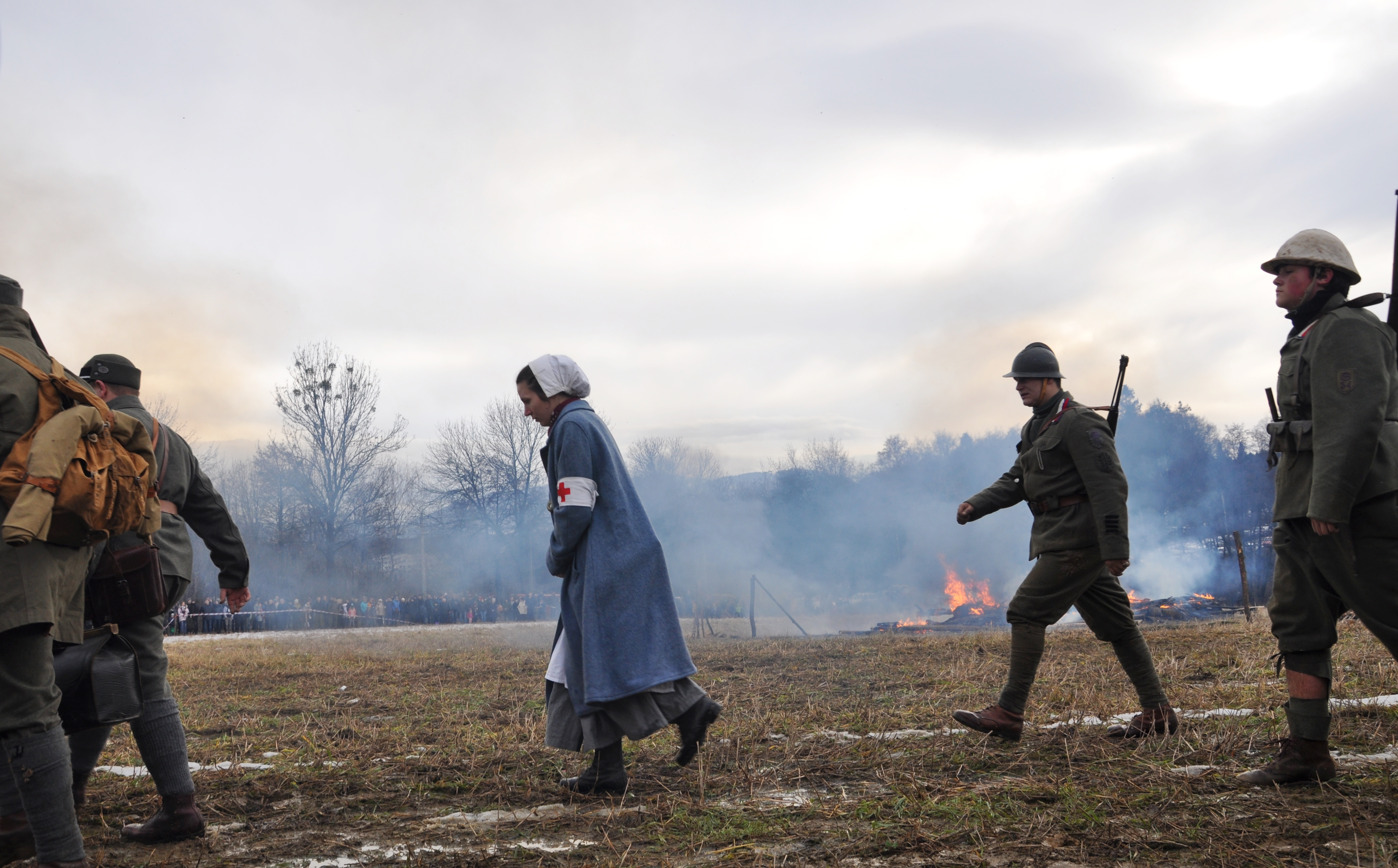
Reconstruction of the battle of Skoczów 2.02.2019

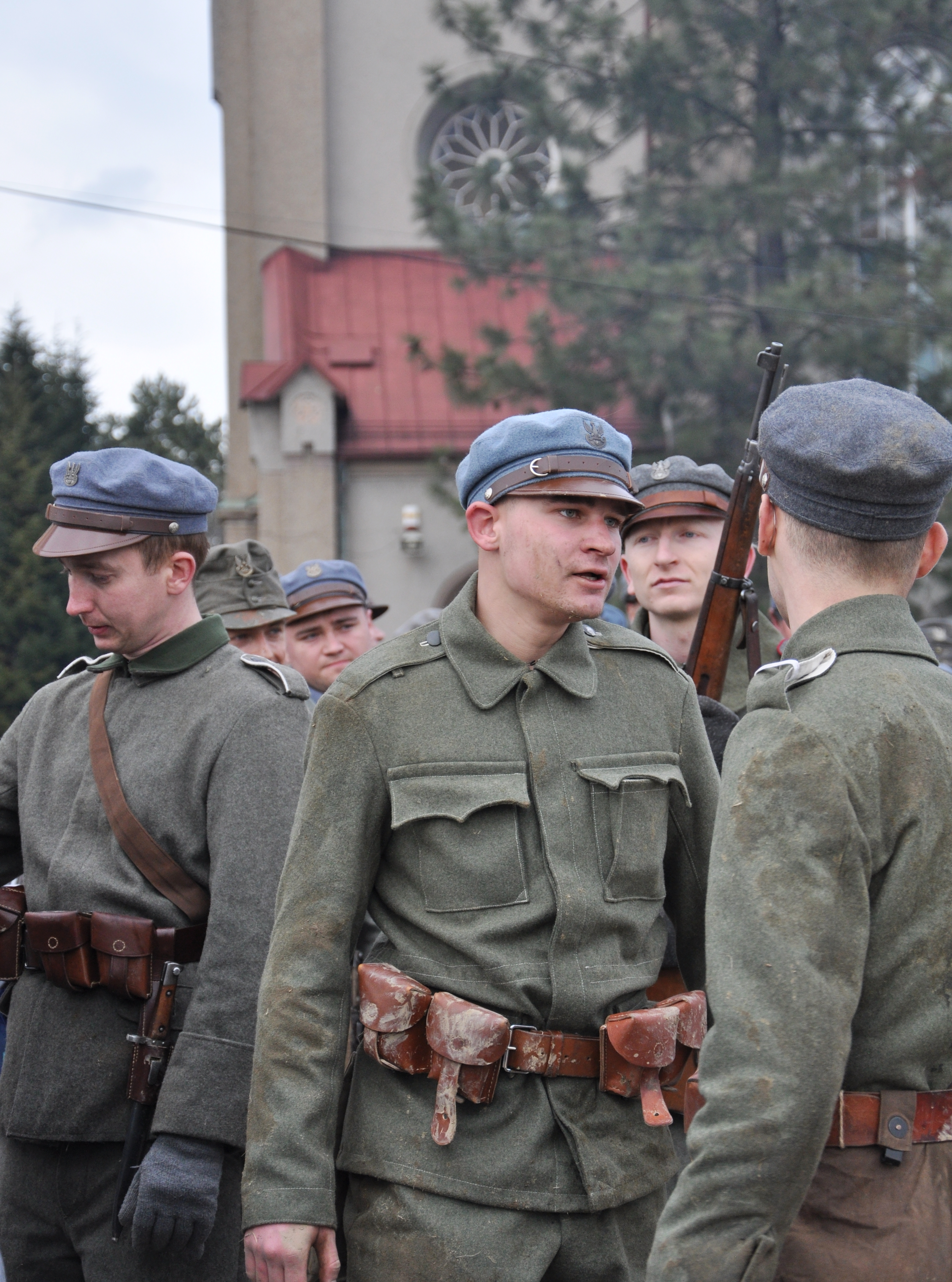
Reconstruction of the battle of Skoczów 2.02.2019

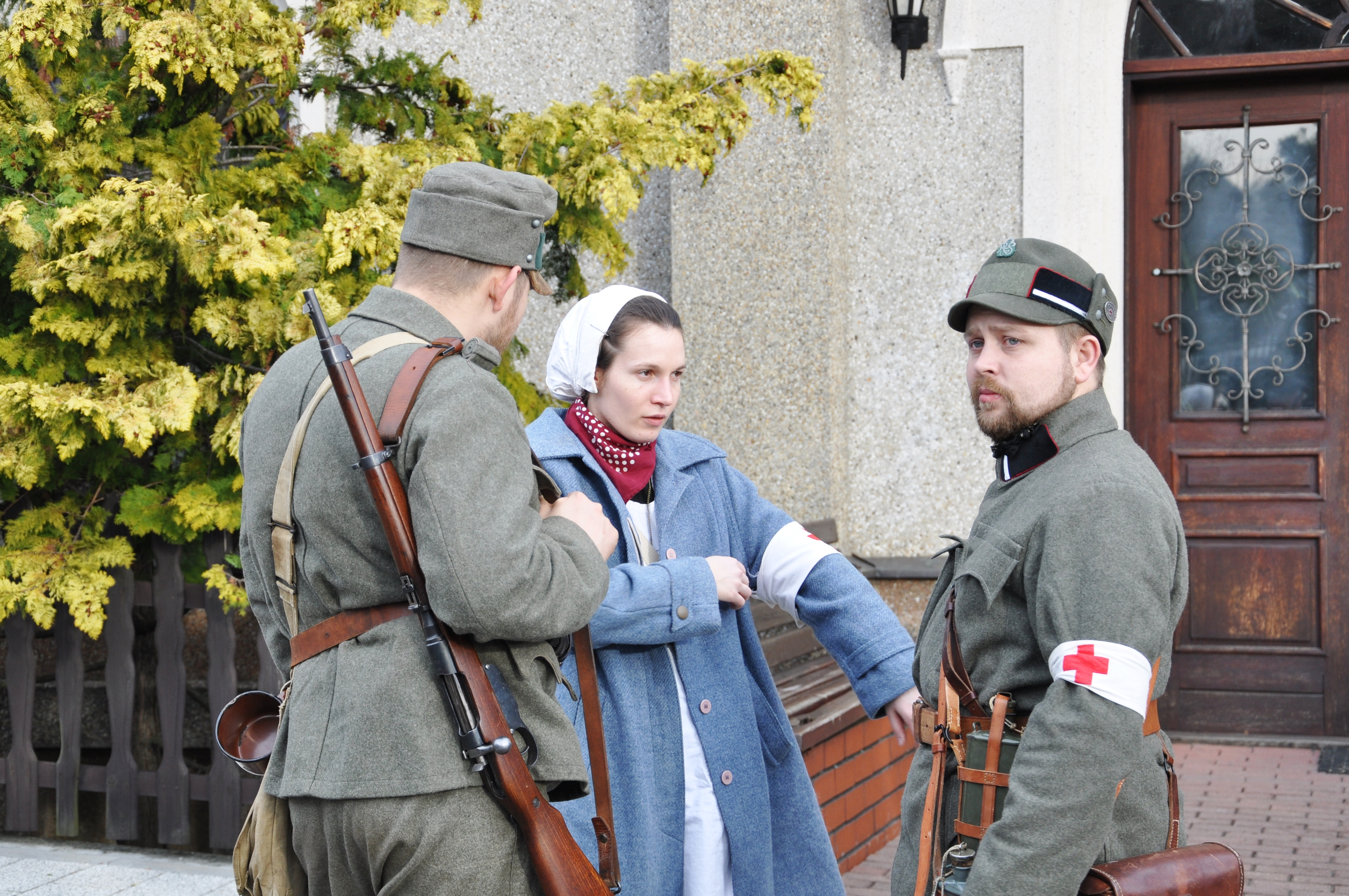
Reconstruction of the battle of Skoczów 2.02.2019
