= Der Roiter Emes =

Yiddish-language newspaper published in Riga, Latvia

- Founded: January 13, 1919
- Ceased publication: May 22, 1919
- Political alignment: Communist
- Language: Yiddish language
- Headquarters: Riga

Der Roiter Emes (Yiddish: דער רויטער אמת, 'The Red Truth') was a Yiddish-language newspaper published from Riga, Latvia. The first issue was published on January 13, 1919. It was an organ of the Communist Party of Latvia. It was published three times per week. The newspaper featured frequent attacks on the bourgeoisie and the Jewish religious establishment. It ceased publication when the Bolshevik forces lost control of Riga on May 22, 1919.
