= Kitsa, Russia =

Kitsa Кица
- Railway station
- Interactive map of Kitsa
- Location of Kitsa Kitsa (Murmansk Oblast)
- Coordinates: 68°31′N 33°11′E
- Country: Russia
- Federal subject: Murmansk Oblast
- Administrative district: Kolsky District
- Territorial okrugSelsoviet: Pushnovsky Territorial Okrug

Population (2010 Census)
  - Total: 45
  - Estimate (2021): 18 (−60%)

Municipal status
  - Municipal district: Kolsky Municipal District
  - Urban settlement: Pushnoy Rural Settlement
- Time zone: UTC+3 (MSK)
- Postal code: 184331
- Dialing code: +7 81553
- OKTMO ID: 47605404126

Kitsa (Russian: Кица) is a rural locality (a railway station) in Pushnovsky Territorial Okrug of Kolsky District in Murmansk Oblast, Russia, located on the Kola Peninsula beyond the Arctic Circle at a height of 180 meters (590 ft) above sea level. Population: 45 (2010 Census).
