= Edmund Taczanowski =

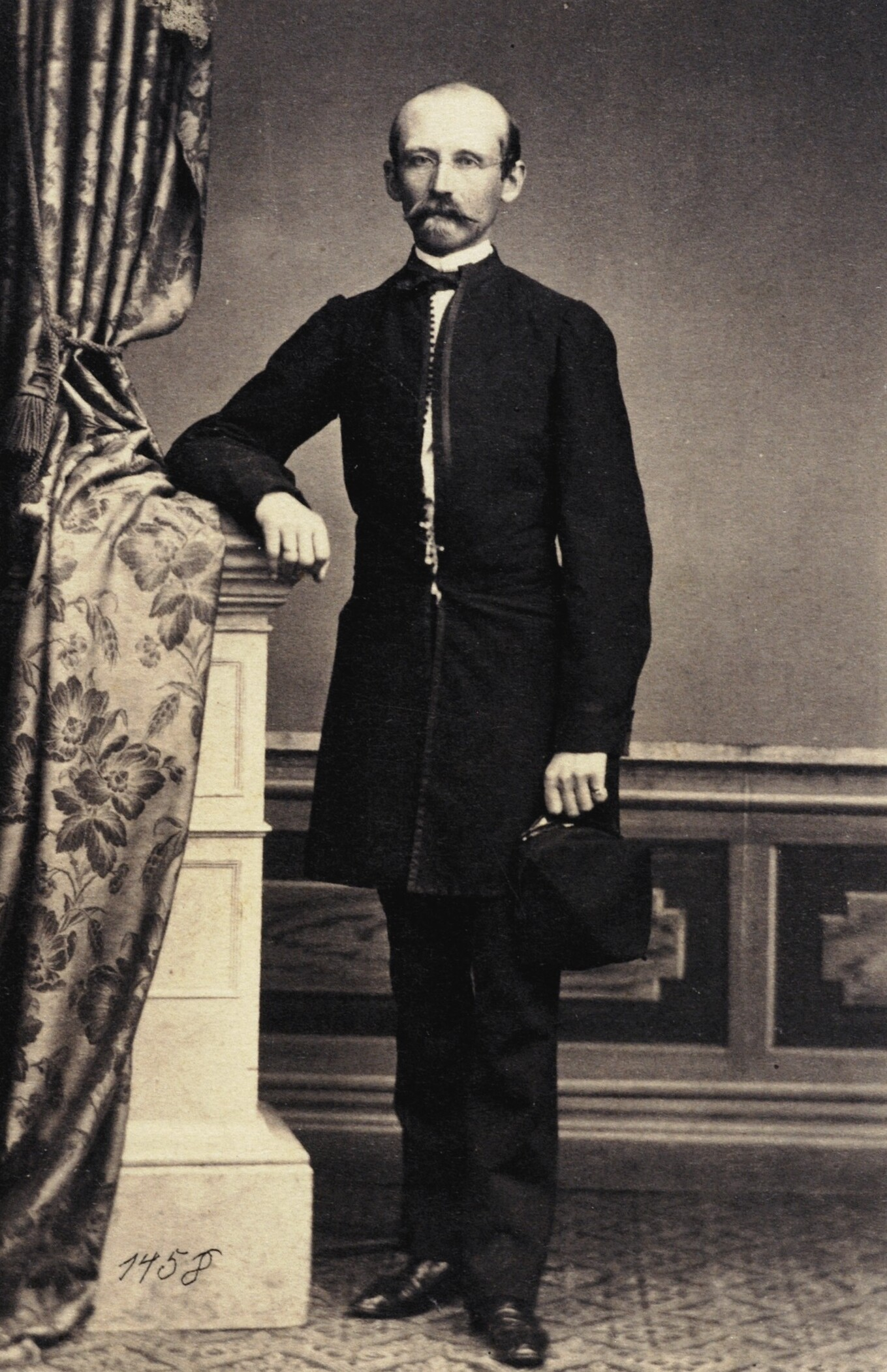
- Born: November 23, 1822; Wieczyn
- Died: September 14, 1879 (aged 56) Choryń
- Buried: Powązki Military Cemetery, Warsaw

Edmund Taczanowski (1822, Wieczyn – 1879, Choryń) was a Polish general, insurrectionist, member of the Taczanowski magnate dynasty (he was grandson of the famous privateer Maksymilian Taczanowski), and Lord of the estate of Choryń in the province of Poznań.

== Early years and military career ==
The son of Jozef Grzegorz Mikolaj Piotr Taczanowski and Franciszka Drweska, as a youth Taczanowski was influenced by Polish poet and national hero Adam Mickiewicz, who lived at Choryń in 1831 while Prussian authorities prevented him from returning to Russian-Poland to support the insurrection there. Originally a Prussian officer, Taczanowski resigned to participate in the Greater Poland Uprisings of 1846 and 1848. After the latter, he was detained by the Prussians in Krotoszyn. After his release he left partitioned Poland for Italy. He served with Giuseppe Garibaldi in the Italian Risorgimento. Wounded, he was placed in French captivity, but he was later released and served as a General in the 1863 Polish revolt against Russian rule. With the collapse of this action and Czarist suppression of the revolution, Taczanowski fled to France and then to Turkey, where he unsuccessfully attempted to find support for the creation of a Polish liberation army and the establishment of an independent Polish state. Under an amnesty, the Prussian government allowed his return to Choryń in 1870 where he remained with his family until his death nine years later. Today, his grave is considered a site of Polish national honour. The manor of Choryń is now a historic landmark bearing plaques in remembrance of both Taczanowski and Mickiewicz.

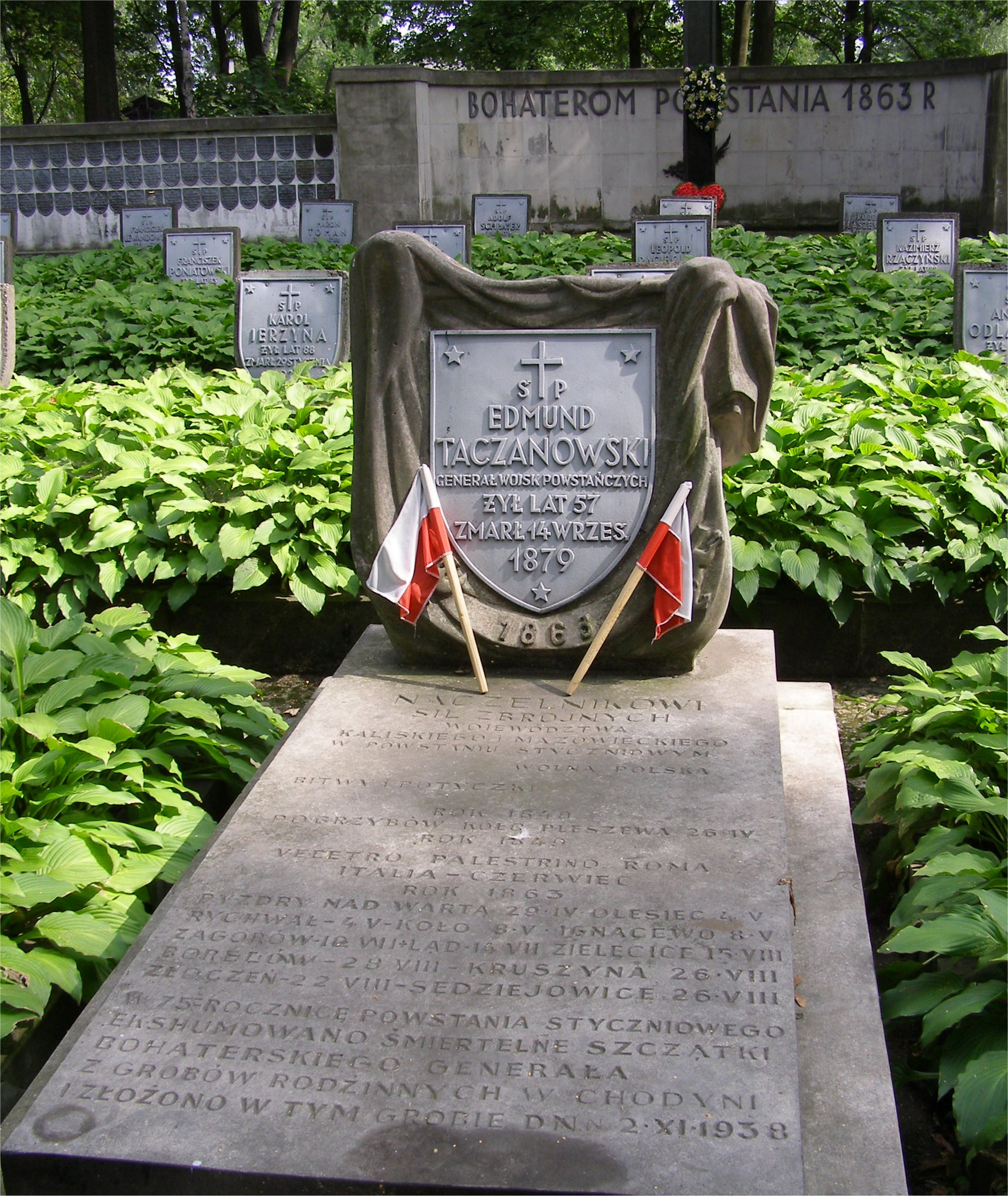
Edmund Taczanowski's grave at the Powązki Military Cemetery, Warsaw

== Personal life ==
He was married in Czermin in 1860 to Aniela Baranowska (daughter of Agnieszka Baranowska). They had six children, including Stanisława Taczanowska and Stefan Taczanowski.
