= Sowina =

Sowina may refer to:

- Sowina, Greater Poland Voivodeship, a village in the administrative district of Gmina Pleszew, within Pleszew County, Greater Poland Voivodeship, in west-central Poland
- Sowina Błotna, a village near Sowina in the administrative district of Gmina Pleszew, within Pleszew County, Greater Poland Voivodeship, in west-central Poland
- Sowina, Jasło County, a village in the administrative district of Gmina Kołaczyce, within Jasło County, Subcarpathian Voivodeship, in south-eastern Poland
- Sowina (pl) – a hamlet in the village of Ludwikowice Kłodzkie, in the administrative district of Gmina Nowa Ruda, within Kłodzko County, Lower Silesian Voivodeship, in south-western Poland
