= Orlina =

Orlina may refer to:

- Orlina, Montenegro, a village in Nikšić Municipality, Montenegro
- Orlina, Lower Silesian Voivodeship, a hamlet of Ciechanowice, a village in Poland
- Orlina Duża, a village in Greater Poland Voivodeship, Poland
- Orlina Mała, a village in Greater Poland Voivodeship, Poland
- Orlina (river), a river in Catalonia, Spain, tributary to Llobregat d'Empordà in turn tributary of Muga
- Feminine form of the surname Orlin
