= Łęg, Pleszew County =

Łęg
- Village
- Location within Poland
- Coordinates: 52°1′6″N 17°47′25″E
- Country: Poland
- Voivodeship: Greater Poland
- County: Pleszew
- Gmina: Czermin

Łęg [wɛnk] is a village in the administrative district of Gmina Czermin, within Pleszew County, Greater Poland Voivodeship, in west-central Poland.
