= Żychlin, Pleszew County =

Żychlin
- Village
- Location within Poland
- Coordinates: 51°46′N 17°51′E
- Country: Poland
- Voivodeship: Greater Poland
- County: Pleszew
- Gmina: Gołuchów
- Population: 200

Żychlin [ˈʐɨxlin] is a village in the administrative district of Gmina Gołuchów, within Pleszew County, Greater Poland Voivodeship, in west-central Poland.
