= Żegocin, Pleszew County =

Żegocin
- Village
- Location within Poland
- Coordinates: 52°0′N 17°46′E
- Country: Poland
- Voivodeship: Greater Poland
- County: Pleszew
- Gmina: Czermin

Żegocin [ʐɛˈɡɔt͡ɕin] is a village in the administrative district of Gmina Czermin, within Pleszew County, Greater Poland Voivodeship, in west-central Poland.
