= Wszołów =

- Village
- Location within Poland
- Coordinates: 51°51′N 17°53′E
- Country: Poland
- Voivodeship: Greater Poland
- County: Pleszew
- Gmina: Gołuchów

Wszołów [ˈfʂɔwuf] is a village in the administrative district of Gmina Gołuchów, within Pleszew County, Greater Poland Voivodeship, in west-central Poland.
