= Lenartowice, Greater Poland Voivodeship =

Lenartowice
- Village
- Location within Poland
- Coordinates: 51°54′N 17°50′E
- Country: Poland
- Voivodeship: Greater Poland
- County: Pleszew
- Gmina: Pleszew

Lenartowice [lɛnartɔˈvit͡sɛ] is a village in the administrative district of Gmina Pleszew, within Pleszew County, Greater Poland Voivodeship, in west-central Poland.
