= Nowa Wieś, Gmina Pleszew =

Nowa Wieś
- Village
- Location within Poland
- Coordinates: 51°52′37″N 17°46′41″E
- Country: Poland
- Voivodeship: Greater Poland
- County: Pleszew
- Gmina: Pleszew
- Population: 340

Nowa Wieś [ˈnɔva ˈvjɛɕ] is a village in the administrative district of Gmina Pleszew, within Pleszew County, Greater Poland Voivodeship, in west-central Poland.
