= Borczysko =

- Village
- Location within Poland
- Coordinates: 51°47′54″N 17°57′32″E
- Country: Poland
- Voivodeship: Greater Poland
- County: Pleszew
- Gmina: Gołuchów

Borczysko [bɔrˈt͡ʂɨskɔ] is a village in the administrative district of Gmina Gołuchów, within Pleszew County, Greater Poland Voivodeship, in west-central Poland.
