= Żale, Greater Poland Voivodeship =

Żale
- Village
- Location within Poland
- Coordinates: 51°57′38″N 17°46′37″E
- Country: Poland
- Voivodeship: Greater Poland
- County: Pleszew
- Gmina: Czermin
- Population: 121

Żale [ˈʐalɛ] is a village in the administrative district of Gmina Czermin, within Pleszew County, Greater Poland Voivodeship, in west-central Poland.
