= Nowa Wieś, Gmina Gizałki =

Nowa Wieś
- Village
- Location within Poland
- Coordinates: 52°3′2″N 17°45′23″E
- Country: Poland
- Voivodeship: Greater Poland
- County: Pleszew
- Gmina: Gizałki
- Population: 330

Nowa Wieś [ˈnɔva ˈvjɛɕ] is a village in the administrative district of Gmina Gizałki, within Pleszew County, Greater Poland Voivodeship, in west-central Poland.
