= Sośniczka =

- Village
- Location within Poland
- Coordinates: 51°50′40″N 17°38′31″E
- Country: Poland
- Voivodeship: Greater Poland
- County: Pleszew
- Gmina: Dobrzyca

Sośniczka [sɔɕˈnit͡ʂka] is a village in the administrative district of Gmina Dobrzyca, within Pleszew County, Greater Poland Voivodeship, in west-central Poland.
