= Szkudła =

- Village
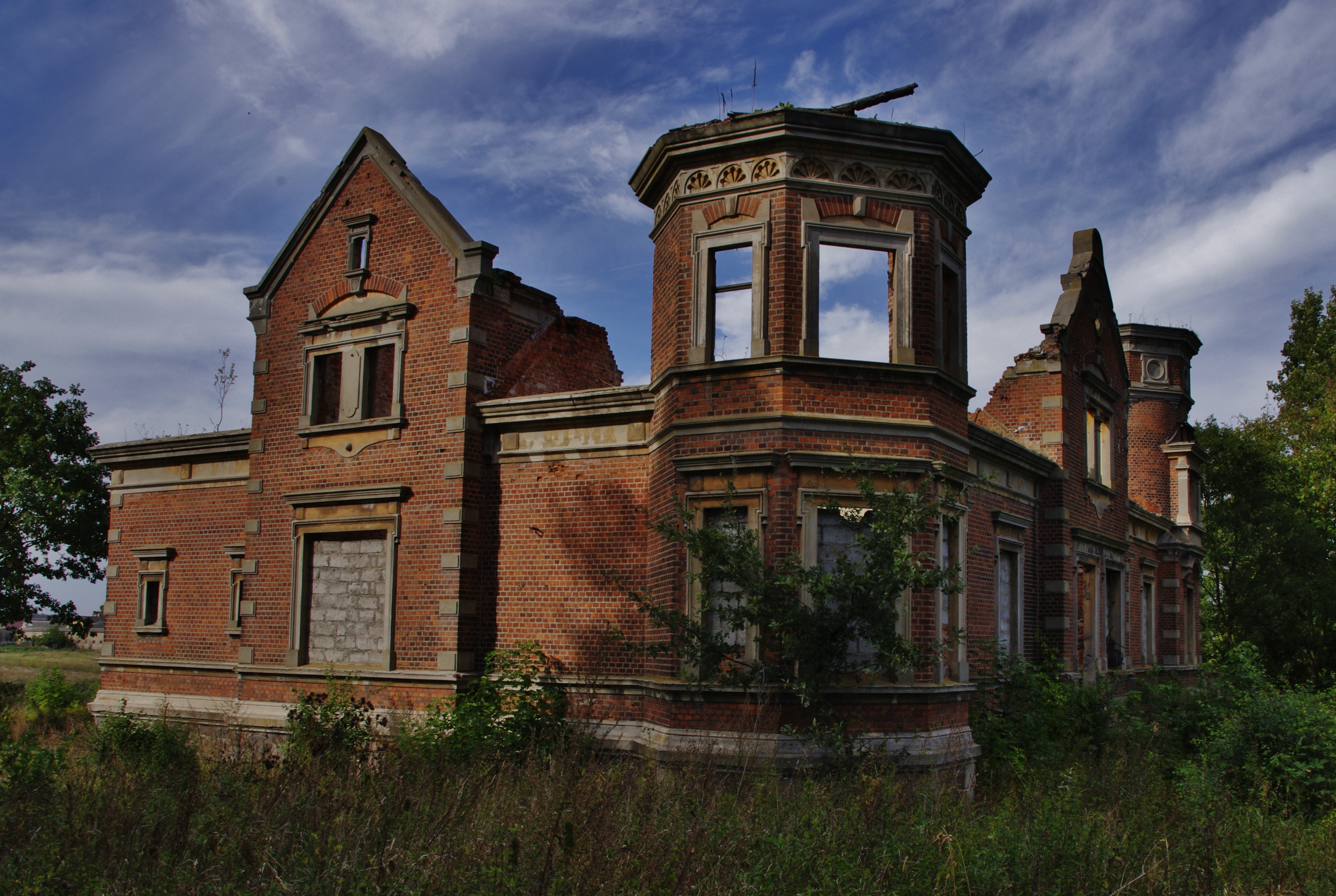

- Location within Poland
- Coordinates: 51°48′45″N 17°54′57″E
- Country: Poland
- Voivodeship: Greater Poland
- County: Pleszew
- Gmina: Gołuchów

Szkudła [ˈʂkudwa] is a village in the administrative district of Gmina Gołuchów, within Pleszew County, Greater Poland Voivodeship, in west-central Poland.
