= Gawlik =

Gawlik is a surname. Notable people with the surname include:

- Christoph Gawlik (born 1987), German ice hockey player
- Ginter Gawlik (1930–2005), Polish soccer player
- Krzysztof Gawlik (born 1965), Polish serial killer
- Stanisław Gawlik (1925–1990), Polish actor
- Weronika Gawlik (born 1986), Polish handball player
- Zbigniew Gawlik (born 1956), Polish handball player
- Rodrigo Gawlik Junior (born 1993), Brazilian-Polish Lawyer

== See also ==
- Gawlikowski
- Meanings of minor planet names: 22001–23000#527
