= Lutynia, Pleszew County =

Lutynia
- Village
- Location within Poland
- Coordinates: 51°53′3″N 17°38′44″E
- Country: Poland
- Voivodeship: Greater Poland
- County: Pleszew
- Gmina: Dobrzyca
- Population: 350

Lutynia [luˈtɨɲa] is a village in the administrative district of Gmina Dobrzyca, within Pleszew County, Greater Poland Voivodeship, in west-central Poland.
