= Kuczków, Greater Poland Voivodeship =

Kuczków
- Village
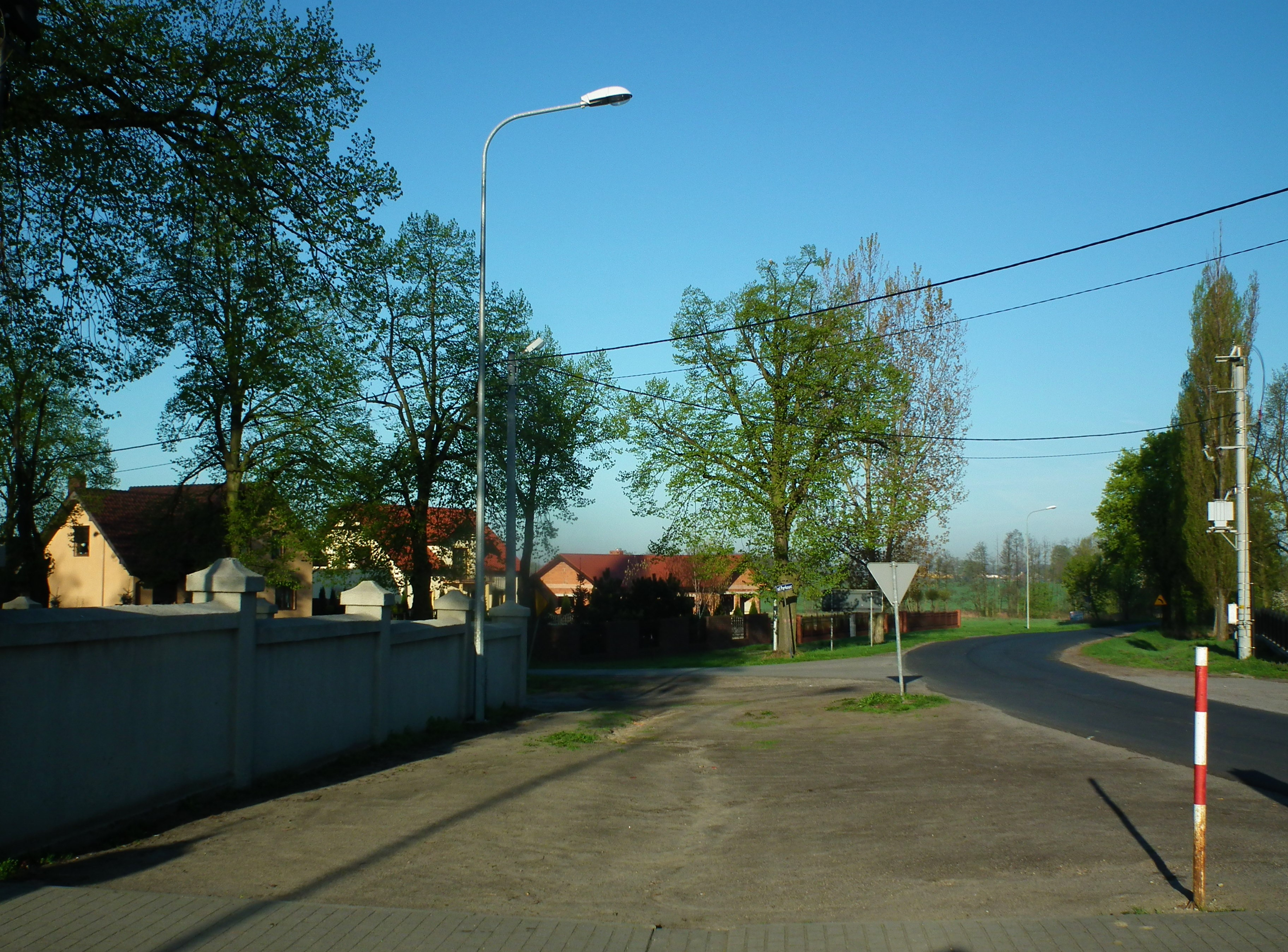
- Houses by the roadside in Kuczków

- Location within Poland
- Coordinates: 51°49′46″N 17°50′27″E
- Country: Poland
- Voivodeship: Greater Poland
- County: Pleszew
- Gmina: Pleszew

Kuczków [ˈkut͡ʂkuf] is a village in the administrative district of Gmina Pleszew, within Pleszew County, Greater Poland Voivodeship, in west-central Poland.
