= Leszczyca =

- Village
- Location within Poland
- Coordinates: 52°03′45″N 17°45′05″E
- Country: Poland
- Voivodeship: Greater Poland
- County: Pleszew
- Gmina: Gizałki

Leszczyca [lɛʂˈt͡ʂɨt͡sa] is a village in the administrative district of Gmina Gizałki, within Pleszew County, Greater Poland Voivodeship, in west-central Poland.
