= Dobra Nadzieja =

- Village
- Location within Poland
- Coordinates: 51°52′N 17°49′E
- Country: Poland
- Voivodeship: Greater Poland
- County: Pleszew
- Gmina: Pleszew

Dobra Nadzieja (Polish pronunciation: [ˈdɔbra naˈd͡ʑɛja]; "Good Hope") is a village in the administrative district of Gmina Pleszew, within Pleszew County, Greater Poland Voivodeship, in west-central Poland.
