= Marszew, Greater Poland Voivodeship =

Marszew
- Village
- Location within Poland
- Coordinates: 51°55′03″N 17°46′31″E
- Country: Poland
- Voivodeship: Greater Poland
- County: Pleszew
- Gmina: Pleszew

Marszew (Polish: [ˈmarʂɛf]) is a village in the administrative district of Gmina Pleszew, within Pleszew County, Greater Poland Voivodeship, in west-central Poland.
