= Żbiki, Greater Poland Voivodeship =

Żbiki
- Village
- Location within Poland
- Coordinates: 51°59′N 17°48′E
- Country: Poland
- Voivodeship: Greater Poland
- County: Pleszew
- Gmina: Czermin

Żbiki [ˈʐbiki] is a village in the administrative district of Gmina Czermin, within Pleszew County, Greater Poland Voivodeship, in west-central Poland.
