= Zawady, Pleszew County =

Zawady
- Village
- Location within Poland
- Coordinates: 51°54′N 17°54′E
- Country: Poland
- Voivodeship: Greater Poland
- County: Pleszew
- Gmina: Pleszew

Zawady [zaˈvadɨ] is a village in the administrative district of Gmina Pleszew, within Pleszew County, Greater Poland Voivodeship, in west-central Poland.
