= Cieśle, Pleszew County =

Cieśle
- Village
- Location within Poland
- Coordinates: 51°51′N 17°50′E
- Country: Poland
- Voivodeship: Greater Poland
- County: Pleszew
- Gmina: Gołuchów

Cieśle [ˈt͡ɕɛɕlɛ] is a village in the administrative district of Gmina Gołuchów, within Pleszew County, Greater Poland Voivodeship, in west-central Poland.
