= Gizałki-Las =

- Settlement
- Location within Poland
- Coordinates: 52°03′22″N 17°48′14″E
- Country: Poland
- Voivodeship: Greater Poland
- County: Pleszew
- Gmina: Gizałki

Gizałki-Las [ɡiˈzau̯ki ˈlas] is a settlement in the administrative district of Gmina Gizałki, within Pleszew County, Greater Poland Voivodeship, in west-central Poland.
