= Psienie-Ostrów =

- Village
- Location within Poland
- Coordinates: 51°57′51″N 17°45′52″E
- Country: Poland
- Voivodeship: Greater Poland
- County: Pleszew
- Gmina: Czermin
- Population: 110

Psienie-Ostrów [ˈpɕɛɲɛ ˈɔstruf] is a village in the administrative district of Gmina Czermin, within Pleszew County, Greater Poland Voivodeship, in west-central Poland.
