= Wola Duchowna =

- Village
- Location within Poland
- Coordinates: 51°57′N 17°47′E
- Country: Poland
- Voivodeship: Greater Poland
- County: Pleszew
- Gmina: Czermin

Wola Duchowna [ˈvɔla duˈxɔvna] is a village in the administrative district of Gmina Czermin, within Pleszew County, Greater Poland Voivodeship, in west-central Poland.
