= Toporów, Greater Poland Voivodeship =

Toporów
- Village
- Location within Poland
- Coordinates: 52°3′10″N 17°49′46″E
- Country: Poland
- Voivodeship: Greater Poland
- County: Pleszew
- Gmina: Gizałki

Toporów [tɔˈpɔruf] is a village in the administrative district of Gmina Gizałki, within Pleszew County, Greater Poland Voivodeship, in west-central Poland.
