= Borucin =

Borucin may refer to:

- Borucin, Greater Poland Voivodeship (west-central Poland)
- Borucin, Kuyavian-Pomeranian Voivodeship (north-central Poland)
- Borucin, Silesian Voivodeship (German: Borutin, south Poland)
- Borucin, West Pomeranian Voivodeship (north-west Poland)
