= Czerminek =

- Village
- Location within Poland
- Coordinates: 51°49′N 17°55′E
- Country: Poland
- Voivodeship: Greater Poland
- County: Pleszew
- Gmina: Gołuchów

Czerminek [t͡ʂɛrˈminɛk] is a village in the administrative district of Gmina Gołuchów, within Pleszew County, Greater Poland Voivodeship, in west-central Poland.
