= Galew, Pleszew County =

Galew
- Village
- Location within Poland
- Coordinates: 51°52′38″N 17°32′18″E
- Country: Poland
- Voivodeship: Greater Poland
- County: Pleszew
- Gmina: Dobrzyca

Galew [ˈɡalɛf] is a village in the administrative district of Gmina Dobrzyca, within Pleszew County, Greater Poland Voivodeship, in west-central Poland.
