= Kucharki =

- Village
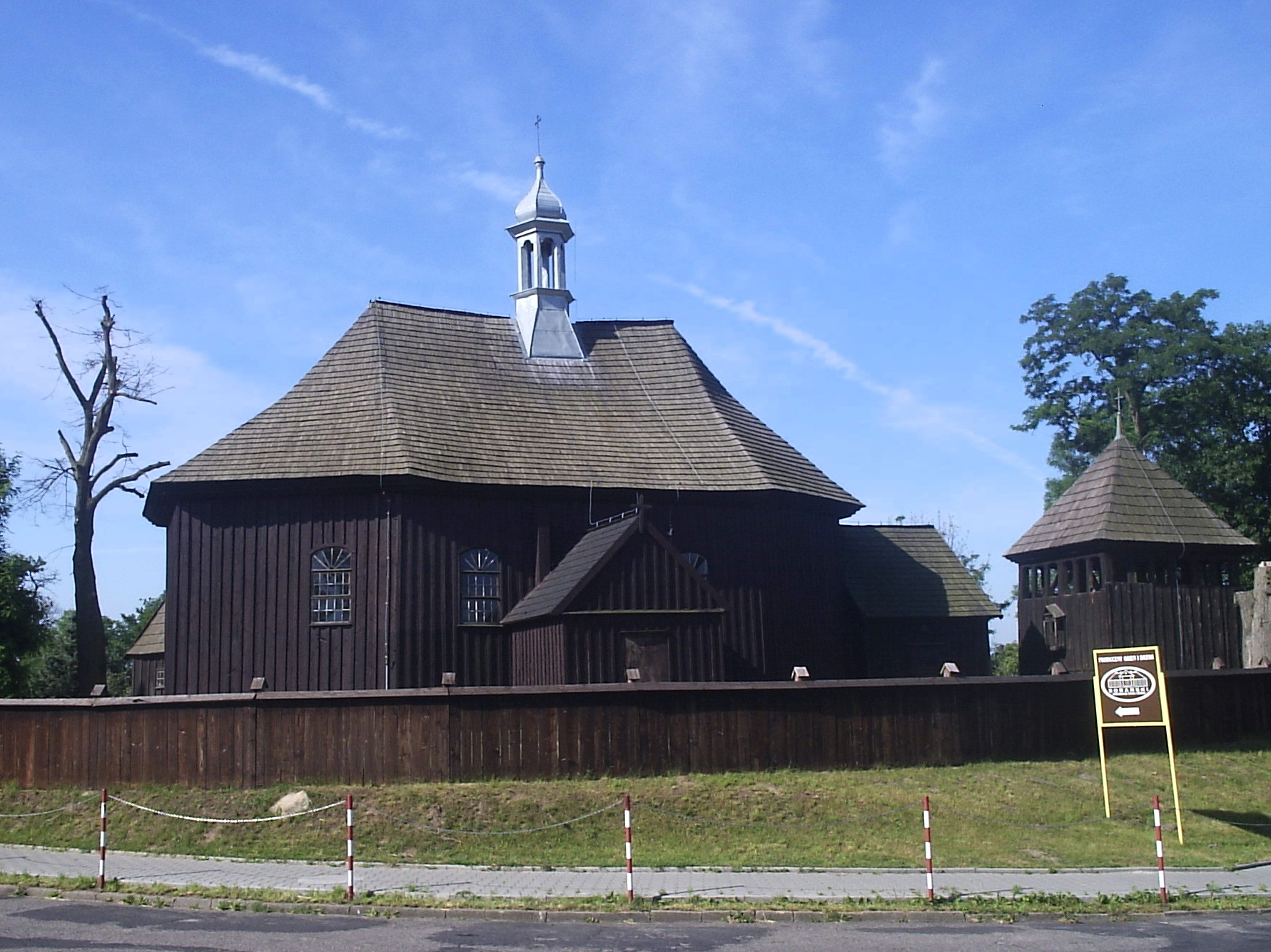
- Church in Kucharki, built in 1754

- Location within Poland
- Coordinates: 51°48′17″N 17°55′6″E
- Country: Poland
- Voivodeship: Greater Poland
- County: Pleszew
- Gmina: Gołuchów
- Population: 300

Kucharki [kuˈxarki] is a village in the administrative district of Gmina Gołuchów, within Pleszew County, Greater Poland Voivodeship, in west-central Poland.
