= Białobłoty =

Białobłoty may refer to the following places:

- Białobłoty, Greater Poland Voivodeship (west-central Poland)
- Białobłoty, Kuyavian-Pomeranian Voivodeship (north-central Poland)
- Białobłoty, Warmian-Masurian Voivodeship (north Poland)
