= Niniew =

- Village
- Location within Poland
- Coordinates: 52°1′N 17°49′E
- Country: Poland
- Voivodeship: Greater Poland
- County: Pleszew
- Gmina: Chocz
- Population: 321

Niniew [ˈniɲɛf] is a village in the administrative district of Gmina Chocz, within Pleszew County, Greater Poland Voivodeship, in west-central Poland.
