= Sośnica, Greater Poland Voivodeship =

Sośnica
- Village
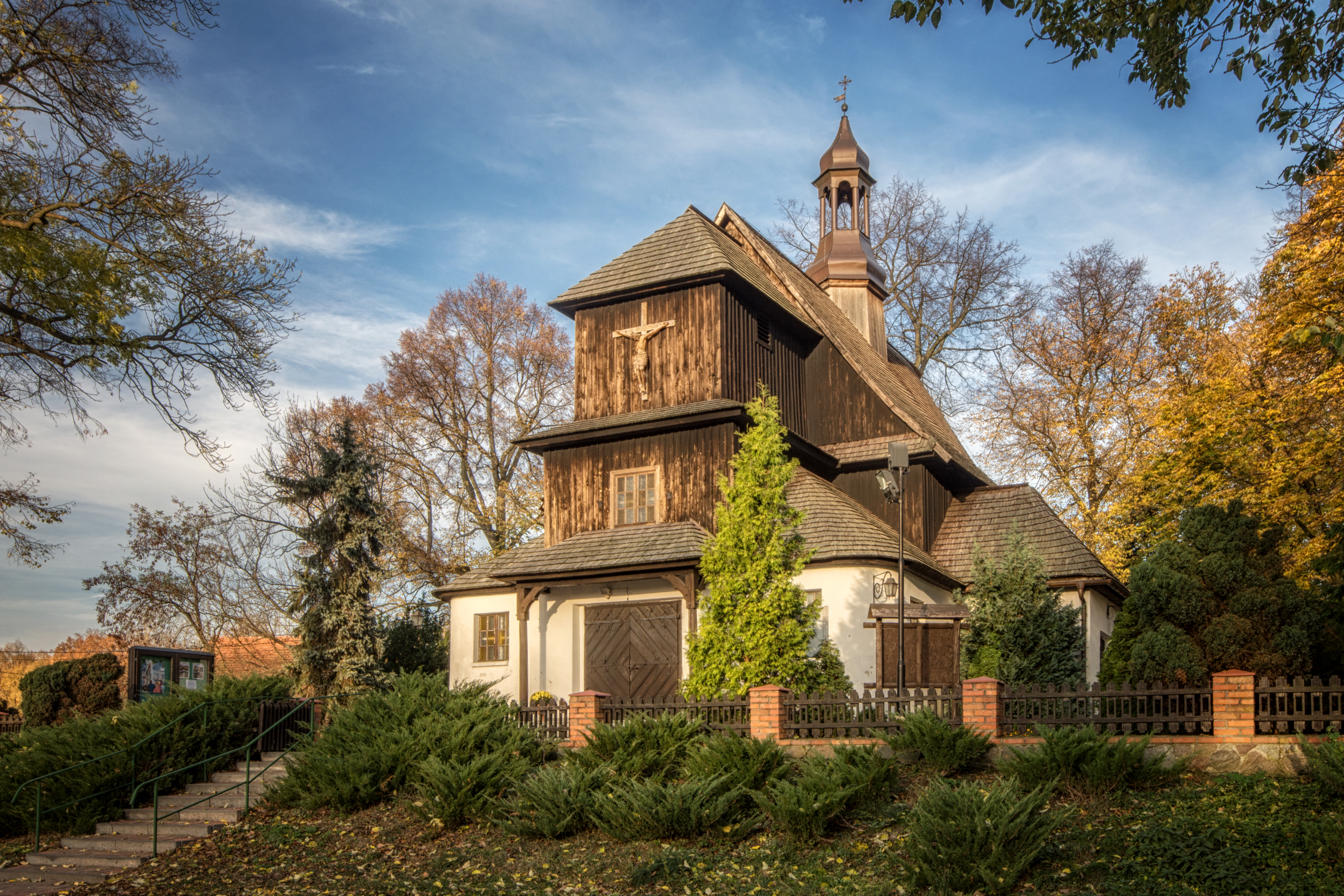
- Church of Saint Mary Magdalene

- Location within Poland
- Coordinates: 51°51′38″N 17°40′44″E
- Country: Poland
- Voivodeship: Greater Poland
- County: Pleszew
- Gmina: Dobrzyca

Sośnica [sɔɕˈnit͡sa] is a village in the administrative district of Gmina Dobrzyca, within Pleszew County, Greater Poland Voivodeship, in west-central Poland.
