= Wierzchowski =

Wierzchowski (feminine: Wierzchowska; plural: Wierzchowscy) is a Polish surname. It is a toponymic surname referring to Wierzchy, a name given to various villages in Poland. The surname Notable people with the surname include:

- Jakub Wierzchowski (born 1977), Polish footballer
- Letícia Wierzchowski (born 1972), Brazilian writer
- Przemysław Wierzchowski (born 1958), Polish photographer
- Wojciech Wierzchowski (1949–2018), Polish physicist
- Leszek Wierzchowski (born 1949), Polish monarchist
- Kazimierz Wierzchowski (born 1929), Polish biologist
- Jerzy Wierzchowski (1927–2017), Polish motorcyclist
- Jerzy Wierzchowski (1926–1995), Polish politician
- Antoni Wierzchowski (1896–1940), Polish commissar
- Zenon Wierzchowski (1888–1981), Polish chemist
- Hieronim Wierzchowski (1860–1942), Polish esperantist
