= Józefów, Pleszew County =

Józefów
- Village
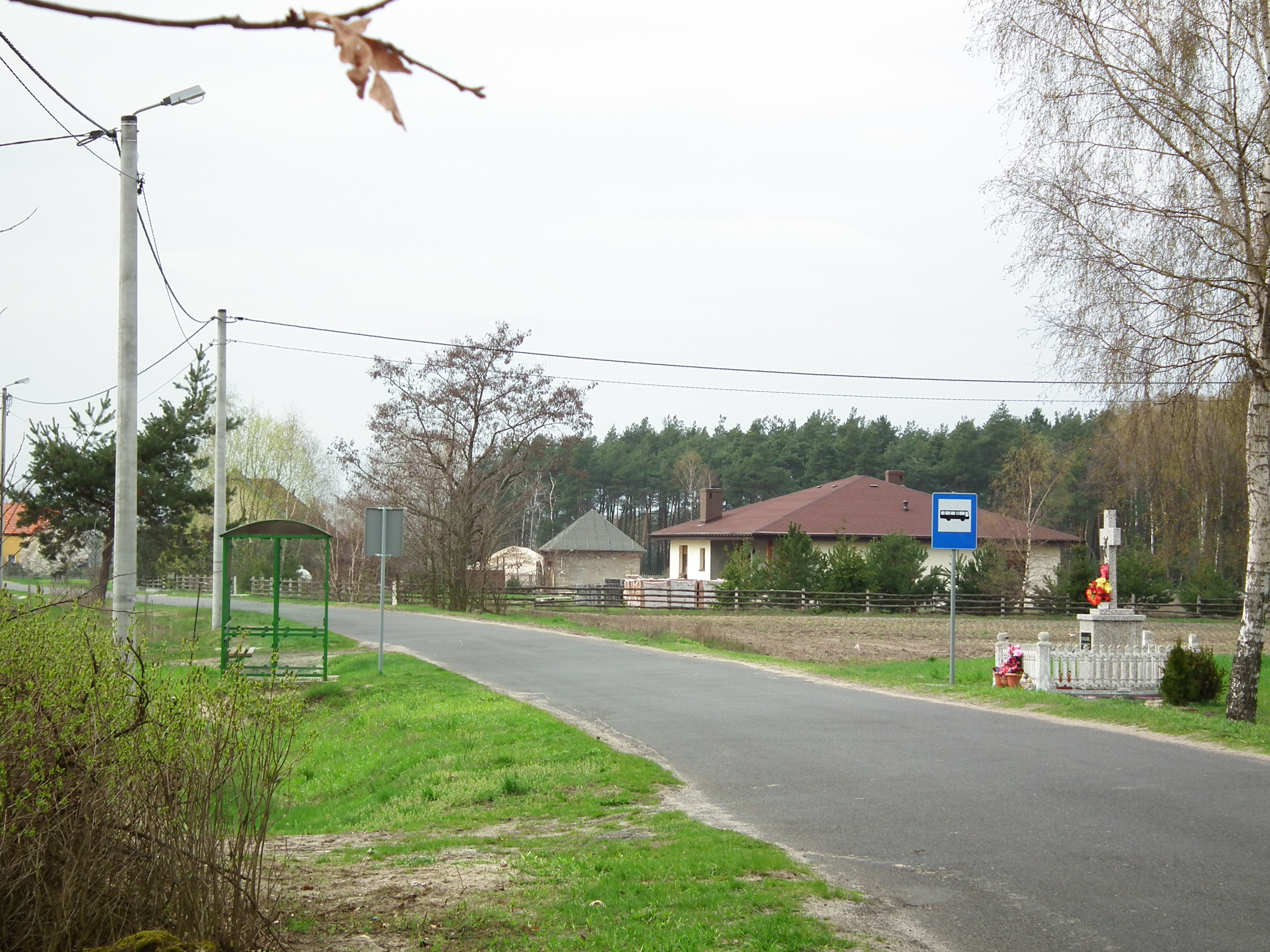
- Street of Józefów, Pleszew County

- Location within Poland
- Coordinates: 51°59′40″N 17°54′27″E
- Country: Poland
- Voivodeship: Greater Poland
- County: Pleszew
- Gmina: Chocz

Józefów (Polish pronunciation: [juˈzɛfuf]) is a village in the administrative district of Gmina Chocz, within Pleszew County, Greater Poland Voivodeship, in west-central Poland.
