= Czołnochów =

- Village
- Location within Poland
- Coordinates: 52°3′N 17°44′E
- Country: Poland
- Voivodeship: Greater Poland
- County: Pleszew
- Gmina: Gizałki

Czołnochów [t͡ʂɔu̯ˈnɔxuf] is a village in the administrative district of Gizałki, Pleszew County, Greater Poland Voivodeship, in west-central Poland.
