= Izbiczno =

- Village
- Location within Poland
- Coordinates: 51°50′32″N 17°37′11″E
- Country: Poland
- Voivodeship: Greater Poland
- County: Pleszew
- Gmina: Dobrzyca

Izbiczno [izˈbit͡ʂnɔ] is a village in the administrative district of Gmina Dobrzyca, within Pleszew County, Greater Poland Voivodeship, in west-central Poland.
