= Pleszówka =

- Village
- Location within Poland
- Coordinates: 51°53′11″N 17°53′12″E
- Country: Poland
- Voivodeship: Greater Poland
- County: Pleszew
- Gmina: Gołuchów
- Population: 180

Pleszówka [plɛˈʂufka] is a village in the administrative district of Gmina Gołuchów, within Pleszew County, Greater Poland Voivodeship, in west-central Poland.
