= Koźminiec =

- Village
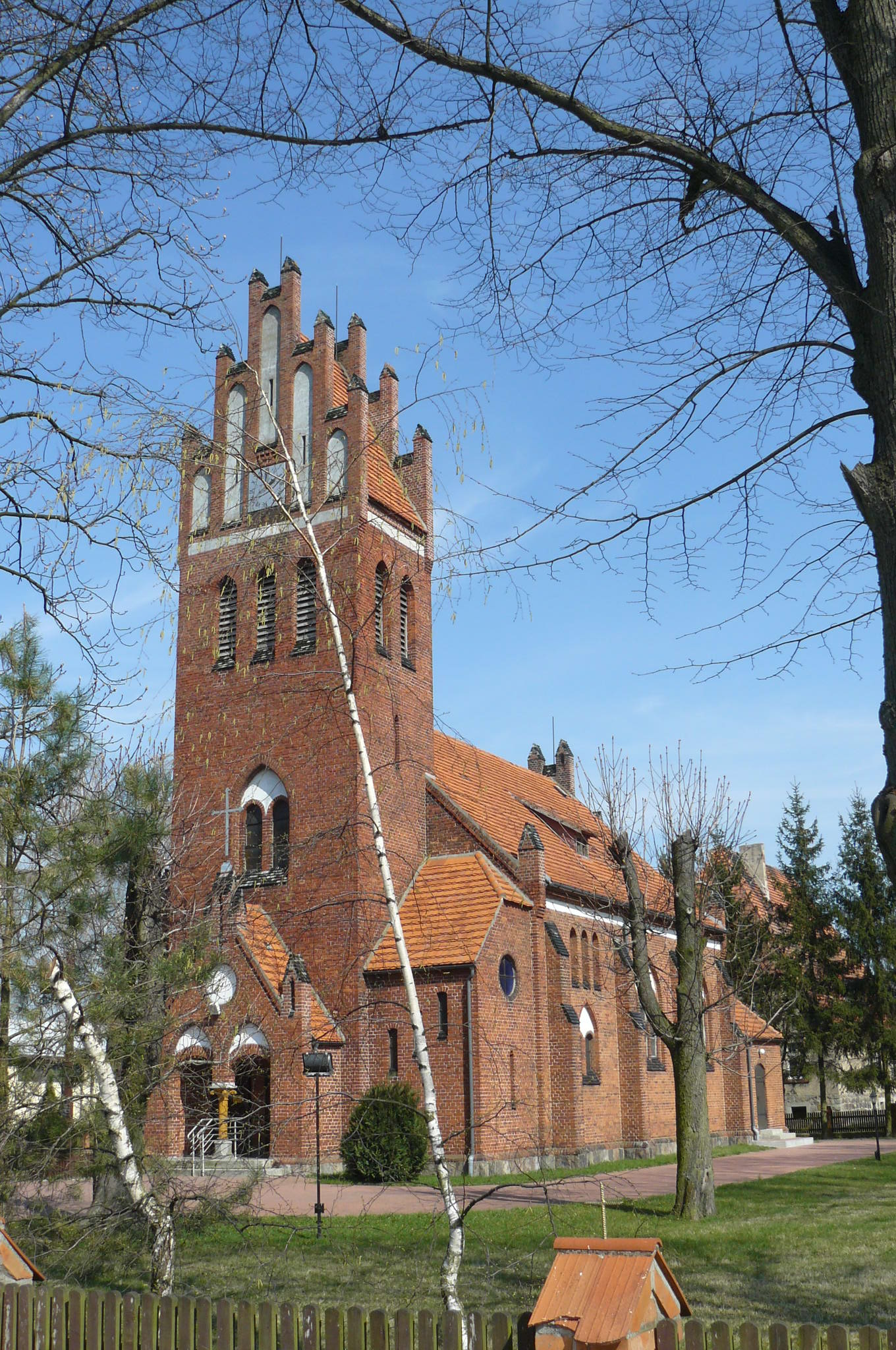
- Church of the Exaltation of the Holy Cross

- Location within Poland
- Coordinates: 51°48′44″N 17°37′18″E
- Country: Poland
- Voivodeship: Greater Poland
- County: Pleszew
- Gmina: Dobrzyca

Koźminiec [kɔʑˈmiɲɛt͡s] is a village in the administrative district of Gmina Dobrzyca, within Pleszew County, Greater Poland Voivodeship, in west-central Poland.
