= Kościelna Wieś, Greater Poland Voivodeship =

Kościelna Wieś
- Village
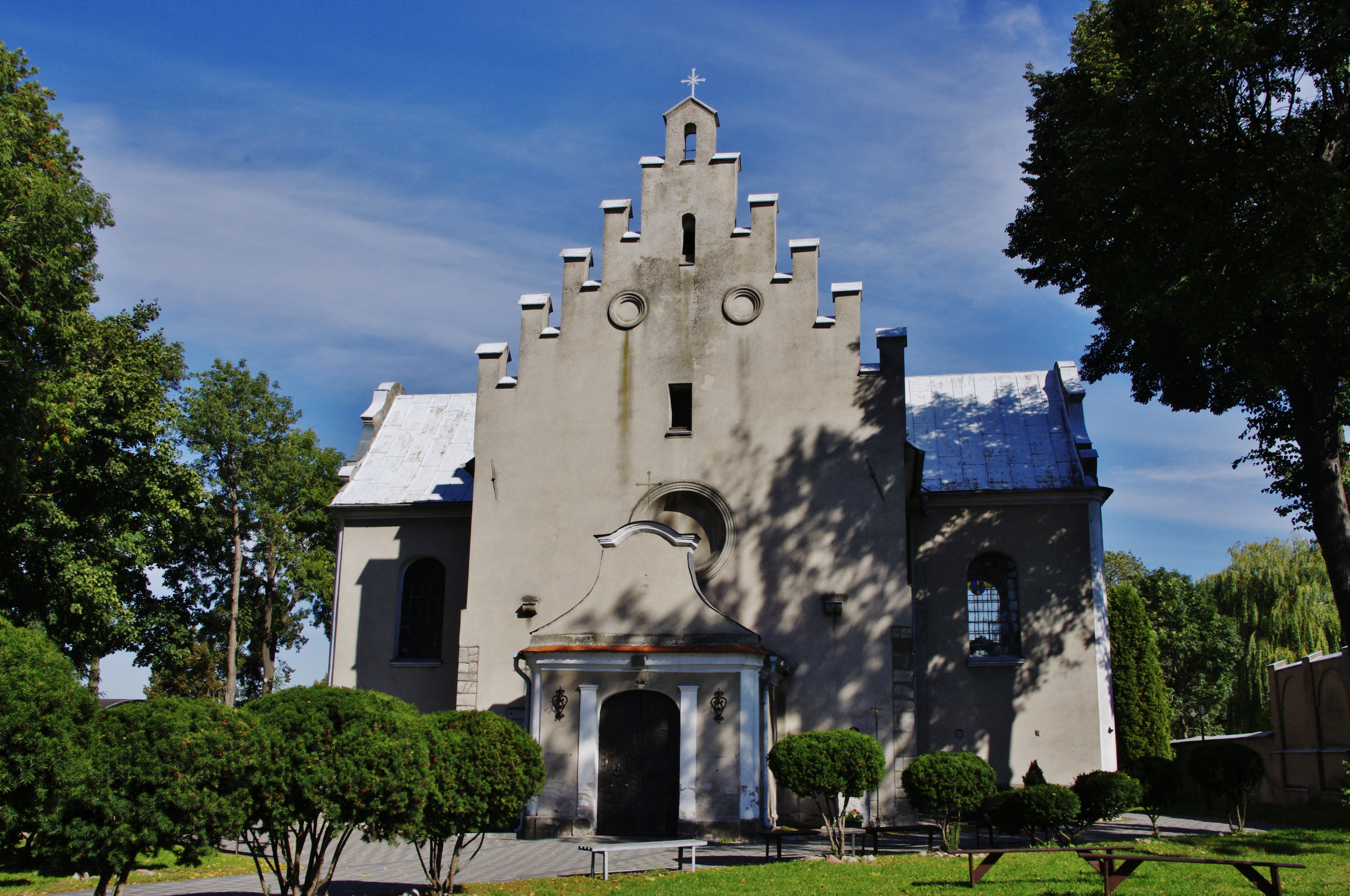
- Church of Saint Lawrence

- Location within Poland
- Coordinates: 51°47′8″N 18°0′34″E
- Country: Poland
- Voivodeship: Greater Poland
- County: Pleszew
- Gmina: Gołuchów

Population
  - Total: 2,500

Kościelna Wieś [kɔɕˈt͡ɕɛlna ˈvjɛɕ] is a village in the administrative district of Gmina Gołuchów, within Pleszew County, Greater Poland Voivodeship, in west-central Poland.
