= Marian Matłoka =

Polish canoeist

Marian Matłoka (3 November 1918 in Nowy Karmin – 9 November 1986 in Wałcz) was a Polish sprint canoeist who competed in the late 1940s. At the 1948 Summer Olympics in London, he finished tenth in the K-2 10000 m event while being eliminated in the heats of the K-2 1000 m event.
