= Macew =

- Village
- Location within Poland
- Coordinates: 51°49′48″N 17°58′42″E
- Country: Poland
- Voivodeship: Greater Poland
- County: Pleszew
- Gmina: Gołuchów

Macew (German 1939-1945 Weide) [ˈmat͡sɛf] is a village in the administrative district of Gmina Gołuchów, within Pleszew County, Greater Poland Voivodeship, in west-central Poland.
