= Tomice-Las =

- Settlement
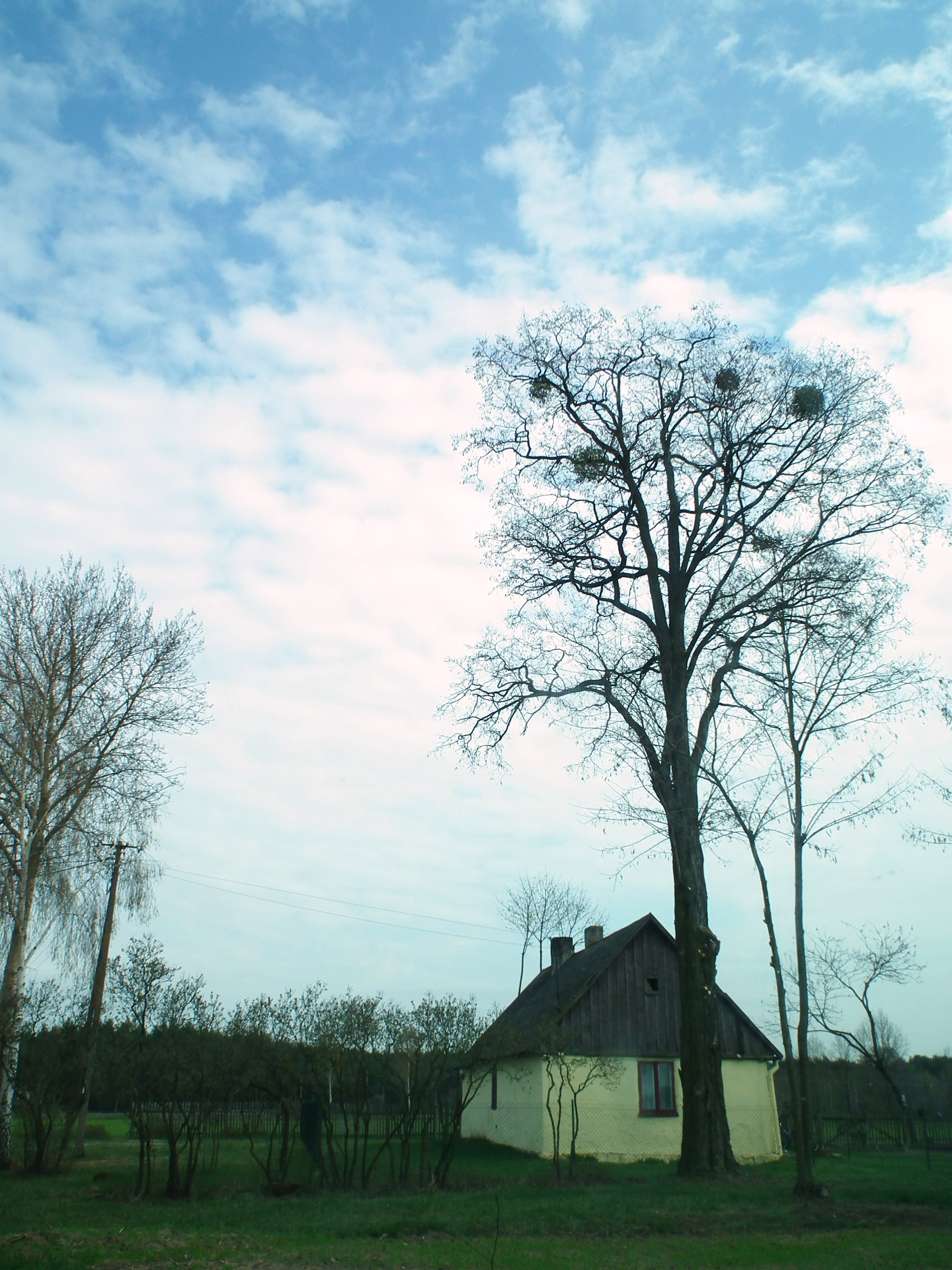

- Location within Poland
- Coordinates: 52°04′24″N 17°46′00″E
- Country: Poland
- Voivodeship: Greater Poland
- County: Pleszew
- Gmina: Gizałki

Tomice-Las [tɔˈmit͡sɛ ˈlas] is a settlement in the administrative district of Gmina Gizałki, within Pleszew County, Greater Poland Voivodeship, in west-central Poland.
