= Brudzewek =

- Village
- Location within Poland
- Coordinates: 51°55′41″N 17°55′54″E
- Country: Poland
- Voivodeship: Greater Poland
- County: Pleszew
- Gmina: Chocz

Brudzewek [bruˈd͡zɛvɛk] is a village in the administrative district of Gmina Chocz, within Pleszew County, Greater Poland Voivodeship, in west-central Poland.
