= Polskie Olędry =

- Village
- Location within Poland
- Coordinates: 51°51′16″N 17°33′7″E
- Country: Poland
- Voivodeship: Greater Poland
- County: Pleszew
- Gmina: Dobrzyca

Polskie Olędry [ˈpɔlskʲɛ ɔˈlɛndrɨ] is a village in the administrative district of Gmina Dobrzyca, within Pleszew County, Greater Poland Voivodeship, in west-central Poland.
