= Obory-Kolonia =

- Village
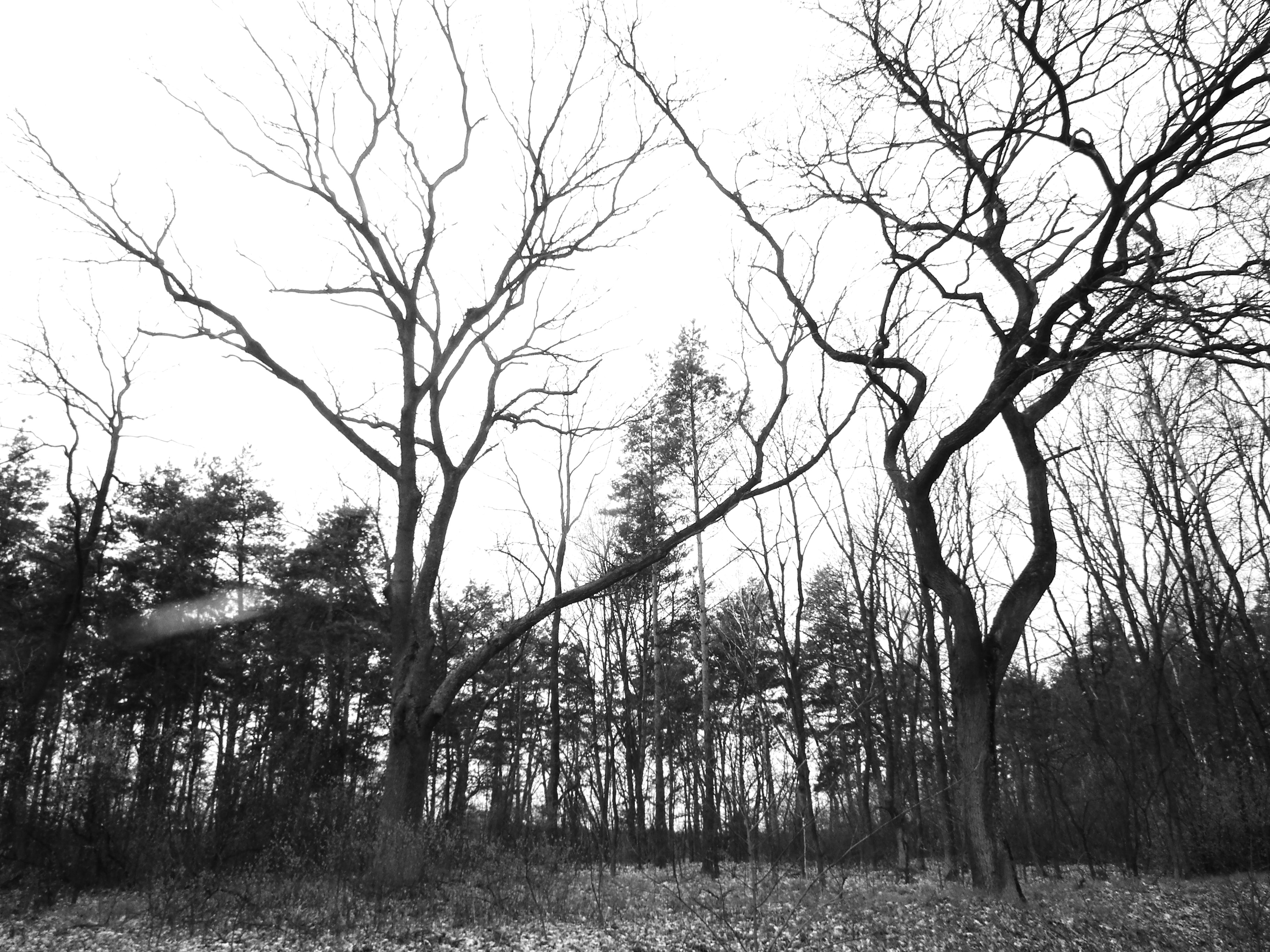
- Old evangelical cemetery in Obory-Kolonia

- Location within Poland
- Coordinates: 52°02′27″N 17°48′21″E
- Country: Poland
- Voivodeship: Greater Poland
- County: Pleszew
- Gmina: Gizałki

Obory-Kolonia [ɔˈbɔrɨ kɔˈlɔɲa] is a village in the administrative district of Gmina Gizałki, within Pleszew County, Greater Poland Voivodeship, in west-central Poland. The main economic activity in the area is agriculture.
