= Fabianów, Pleszew County =

Fabianów
- Village
- Location within Poland
- Coordinates: 51°52′30″N 17°39′54″E
- Country: Poland
- Voivodeship: Greater Poland
- County: Pleszew
- Gmina: Dobrzyca

Fabianów [faˈbjanuf] is a village in the administrative district of Gmina Dobrzyca, within Pleszew County, Greater Poland Voivodeship, in west-central Poland.
