= Trzebin =

Trzebin may refer to the following places:

- Trzebin, Greater Poland Voivodeship (west-central Poland)
- Trzebin, Myślibórz County in West Pomeranian Voivodeship (north-west Poland)
- Trzebin, Wałcz County in West Pomeranian Voivodeship (north-west Poland)
