= Pacanowice =

- Village
- Location within Poland
- Coordinates: 51°56′N 17°50′E
- Country: Poland
- Voivodeship: Greater Poland
- County: Pleszew
- Gmina: Pleszew

Pacanowice [pat͡sanɔˈvit͡sɛ] is a village in the administrative district of Gmina Pleszew, within Pleszew County, Greater Poland Voivodeship, in west-central Poland.
