= Taczanów Drugi =

- Village
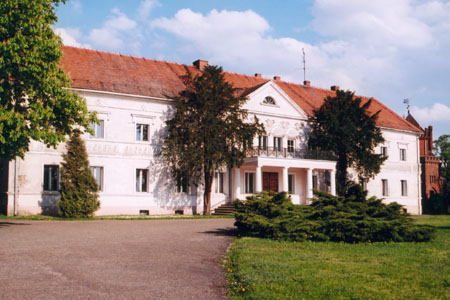
- Palace in the village

- Location within Poland
- Coordinates: 51°50′22″N 17°45′30″E
- Country: Poland
- Voivodeship: Greater Poland
- County: Pleszew
- Gmina: Pleszew

Taczanów Drugi [taˈt͡ʂanuf ˈdruɡi] is a village in the administrative district of Gmina Pleszew, within Pleszew County, Greater Poland Voivodeship, in west-central Poland.
