= Ruda, Pleszew County =

Ruda
- Village
- Location within Poland
- Coordinates: 51°53′28″N 17°36′39″E
- Country: Poland
- Voivodeship: Greater Poland
- County: Pleszew
- Gmina: Dobrzyca

Ruda [ˈruda] is a village in the administrative district of Gmina Dobrzyca, within Pleszew County, Greater Poland Voivodeship, in west-central Poland.
