= Kuchary, Greater Poland Voivodeship =

Kuchary
- Village
- Location within Poland
- Coordinates: 51°49′N 17°59′E
- Country: Poland
- Voivodeship: Greater Poland
- County: Pleszew
- Gmina: Gołuchów

Kuchary (German 1939-1945 Grenzdorf) [kuˈxarɨ] is a village in the administrative district of Gmina Gołuchów, within Pleszew County, Greater Poland Voivodeship, in west-central Poland.
