= Popówek, Greater Poland Voivodeship =

Popówek
- Village
- Location within Poland
- Coordinates: 51°49′13″N 17°58′29″E
- Country: Poland
- Voivodeship: Greater Poland
- County: Pleszew
- Gmina: Gołuchów

Popówek (German 1939-1945 Prossen) [pɔˈpuvɛk] is a village in the administrative district of Gmina Gołuchów, within Pleszew County, Greater Poland Voivodeship, in west-central Poland.
