= Ostrowska Kolonia =

- Village
- Location within Poland
- Coordinates: 52°4′10″N 17°50′26″E
- Country: Poland
- Voivodeship: Greater Poland
- County: Pleszew
- Gmina: Gizałki
- Population: 140

Ostrowska Kolonia [ɔsˈtrɔfska kɔˈlɔɲa] is a village in the administrative district of Gmina Gizałki, within Pleszew County, Greater Poland Voivodeship, in west-central Poland.
