= Studzianka =

Studzianka may refer to the following places:

- Studzianka, Greater Poland Voivodeship (west-central Poland)
- Studzianka, Lublin Voivodeship (east Poland)
- Studzianka, Podlaskie Voivodeship (north-east Poland)
- Studzianka, Warmian-Masurian Voivodeship (north Poland)
- Studzianka, today Studyanka (uk:Студянка), Ukraine
- Studzianka (be:Студзянка), Belarus
