= Bogusławice, Pleszew County =

Bogusławice
- Village
- Location within Poland
- Coordinates: 51°53′52″N 17°55′59″E
- Country: Poland
- Voivodeship: Greater Poland
- County: Pleszew
- Gmina: Gołuchów
- Population: 160

Bogusławice [bɔɡuswaˈvit͡sɛ] is a village in the administrative district of Gmina Gołuchów, within Pleszew County, Greater Poland Voivodeship, in west-central Poland.
