= Ludwina, Greater Poland Voivodeship =

Ludwina
- Village
- Location within Poland
- Coordinates: 51°51′N 17°47′E
- Country: Poland
- Voivodeship: Greater Poland
- County: Pleszew
- Gmina: Pleszew
- Population: 125

Ludwina [ludˈvina] is a village in the administrative district of Gmina Pleszew, within Pleszew County, Greater Poland Voivodeship, in west-central Poland.
