= Piła, Pleszew County =

Piła
- Village
- Location within Poland
- Coordinates: 51°57′N 17°55′E
- Country: Poland
- Voivodeship: Greater Poland
- County: Pleszew
- Gmina: Chocz

Piła [ˈpiwa] is a village in the administrative district of Gmina Chocz, within Pleszew County, Greater Poland Voivodeship, in west-central Poland.
