= Wronów, Pleszew County =

Wronów
- Village
- Location within Poland
- Coordinates: 52°3′N 17°50′E
- Country: Poland
- Voivodeship: Greater Poland
- County: Pleszew
- Gmina: Gizałki

Wronów [ˈvrɔnuf] is a village in the administrative district of Gmina Gizałki, within Pleszew County, Greater Poland Voivodeship, in west-central Poland.
