= Zielona Łąka, Greater Poland Voivodeship =

Zielona Łąka
- Village
- Location within Poland
- Coordinates: 51°53′N 17°49′E
- Country: Poland
- Voivodeship: Greater Poland
- County: Pleszew
- Gmina: Pleszew

Zielona Łąka (Polish: [ʑɛˈlɔna ˈwɔŋka]) is a village in the administrative district of Gmina Pleszew, within Pleszew County, Greater Poland Voivodeship, in west-central Poland.
