= Bielawy, Pleszew County =

Bielawy
- Village
- Location within Poland
- Coordinates: 51°51′51″N 17°54′12″E
- Country: Poland
- Voivodeship: Greater Poland
- County: Pleszew
- Gmina: Gołuchów
- Population: 60

Bielawy ([bjɛˈlavɨ]; German: Bielawy, 1939–45 Bleichen) is a village in the administrative district of Gmina Gołuchów, within Pleszew County, Greater Poland Voivodeship, in west-central Poland.
