= Obory, Pleszew County =

Obory
- Village
- Location within Poland
- Coordinates: 52°3′27″N 17°51′36″E
- Country: Poland
- Voivodeship: Greater Poland
- County: Pleszew
- Gmina: Gizałki
- Population: 390

Obory [ɔˈbɔrɨ] is a village in the administrative district of Gmina Gizałki, within Pleszew County, Greater Poland Voivodeship, in west-central Poland.
