= Czarnuszka, Greater Poland Voivodeship =

Czarnuszka
- Village
- Location within Poland
- Coordinates: 51°51′41″N 17°42′43″E
- Country: Poland
- Voivodeship: Greater Poland
- County: Pleszew
- Gmina: Dobrzyca

Czarnuszka [t͡ʂarˈnuʂka] is a village in the administrative district of Gmina Dobrzyca, within Pleszew County, Greater Poland Voivodeship, in west-central Poland.
