= Tomice-Młynik =

- Settlement
- Location within Poland
- Coordinates: 52°04′46″N 17°45′08″E
- Country: Poland
- Voivodeship: Greater Poland
- County: Pleszew
- Gmina: Gizałki

Tomice-Młynik [tɔˈmit͡sɛ ˈmwɨnik] is a settlement in the administrative district of Gmina Gizałki, within Pleszew County, Greater Poland Voivodeship, in west-central Poland.
