= Kajew, Greater Poland Voivodeship =

Kajew
- Village
- Location within Poland
- Coordinates: 51°52′N 17°52′E
- Country: Poland
- Voivodeship: Greater Poland
- County: Pleszew
- Gmina: Gołuchów

Kajew [ˈkajɛf] is a village in the administrative district of Gmina Gołuchów, within Pleszew County, Greater Poland Voivodeship, in west-central Poland.
