= Baranówek, Greater Poland Voivodeship =

Baranówek
- Village
- Location within Poland
- Coordinates: 51°52′48″N 17°45′15″E
- Country: Poland
- Voivodeship: Greater Poland
- County: Pleszew
- Gmina: Pleszew
- Population: 110

Baranówek [baraˈnuvɛk] is a village in the administrative district of Gmina Pleszew, within Pleszew County, Greater Poland Voivodeship, in west-central Poland.
