= Stary Olesiec =

- Village
- Location within Poland
- Coordinates: 51°57′55.52″N 17°53′29.68″E
- Country: Poland
- Voivodeship: Greater Poland
- County: Pleszew
- Gmina: Chocz

Stary Olesiec [ˈstarɨ ɔˈlɛɕɛt͡s] is a village in the administrative district of Gmina Chocz, within Pleszew County, Greater Poland Voivodeship, in west-central Poland.
