= Karminek =

- Village
- Location within Poland
- Coordinates: 51°49′N 17°41′E
- Country: Poland
- Voivodeship: Greater Poland
- County: Pleszew
- Gmina: Dobrzyca
- Population: 460

Karminek [karˈminɛk] is a village in the administrative district of Gmina Dobrzyca, within Pleszew County, Greater Poland Voivodeship, in west-central Poland.
