= Tursko, Greater Poland Voivodeship =

Tursko
- Village
- Location within Poland
- Coordinates: 51°53′N 17°56′E
- Country: Poland
- Voivodeship: Greater Poland
- County: Pleszew
- Gmina: Gołuchów

Tursko [ˈturskɔ] is a village in the administrative district of Gmina Gołuchów, within Pleszew County, Greater Poland Voivodeship, in west-central Poland.
