= Agnieszka Baranowska =

Polish playwright and poet

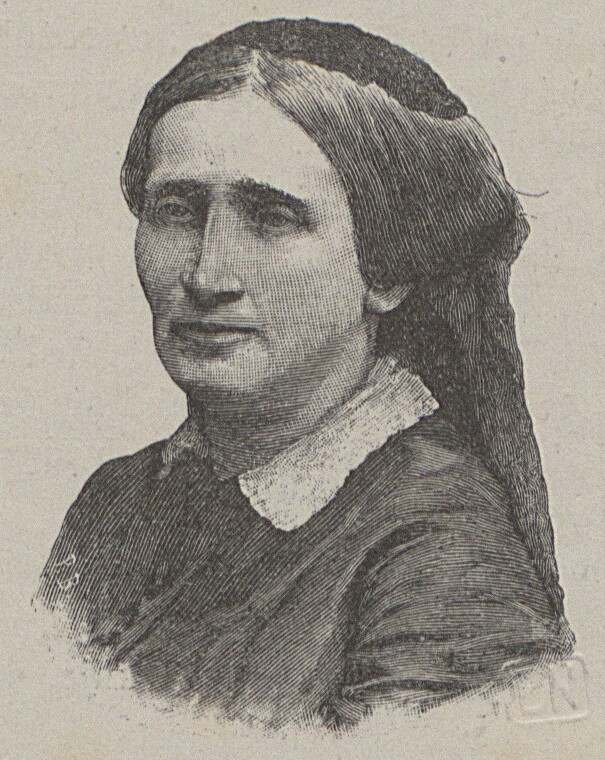
Agnieszka Lipska Baranowska (1819 - 1890)

Agnieszka Lipska Baranowska (1819–1890) was a Polish playwright and poet.

Born on 16 April 1819 in Stary Gostków near Łęczyca in a Polish szlachta family of Lipscy to Jacob Lipski and Marjania Zaluska, she spent her life in the Prussian partition, including the Grand Duchy of Posen (Poznań). She had one brother, Konstanty, who died when she was six.

She was married in 1838 to Stanisław Baranowski (1806–1843), who was an officer in the Polish forces during the January Uprising. They had four children:

- Maria-Antonina Baranowska (1840–1880), mother of noted Pole Rodryg Dunin
- Aniela Zofia Baranowska (1842 – c. 1917) (married to Edmund Taczanowski in 1860)
- Stefan Baranowski
- Stanisława Baranowska (1844–1927)

After her husband's death in 1843, while she was pregnant with their daughter Stanisława, she became the head of the family at the age of 24, and took care of their lands in Marszew.

She had many friends and colleagues among the Polish writers of the Great Emigration, some of whom visited her manor in Marszew. They included Karol Baliński, Teofil Lenartowicz, Franciszek Mickiewicz and Eweryst Estkowski. She took part in many activities designed to promote Polish culture, and sponsored and organized various festivities or organizations (such as the Society of Scientific Help for Girls (Towarzystwo Pomocy Naukowej dla dziewcząt)).

She wrote several plays for the local theater in Pleszew, likely inspired by and with the encouragement of Stanisław Sczaniecki from Karmin. She also wrote many poems, some of which she dedicated to the great Polish poet Adam Mickiewicz. Most of her works were dedicated to rekindling the patriotic spirit of Poles, and used many elements from myths and legends of Greater Poland. Some of them were printed in the women's press ("Lechu", "Dwutygodniku dla Kobiet").

She died on 15 December 1890 in Posen.
