= Świerczyna, Pleszew County =

Świerczyna
- Village
- Location within Poland
- Coordinates: 52°4′N 17°51′E
- Country: Poland
- Voivodeship: Greater Poland
- County: Pleszew
- Gmina: Gizałki

Świerczyna (Polish pronunciation: [ɕfjɛrˈt͡ʂɨna]) is a village in the administrative district of Gmina Gizałki, within Pleszew County, Greater Poland Voivodeship, in west-central Poland.

== Notable people ==
- Krzysztof Gawlik (born 1965), serial killer
