= Dobrzyca-Nowy Świat =

- Village
- Location within Poland
- Coordinates: 51°51′8″N 17°37′11″E
- Country: Poland
- Voivodeship: Greater Poland
- County: Pleszew
- Gmina: Dobrzyca
- Population: 700

Dobrzyca-Nowy Świat (Polish pronunciation: [dɔˈbʐɨt͡sa ˈnɔvɨ ˈɕfjat]) is a village in the administrative district of Gmina Dobrzyca, within Pleszew County, Greater Poland Voivodeship, in west-central Poland.
