= Stara Kaźmierka =

- Village
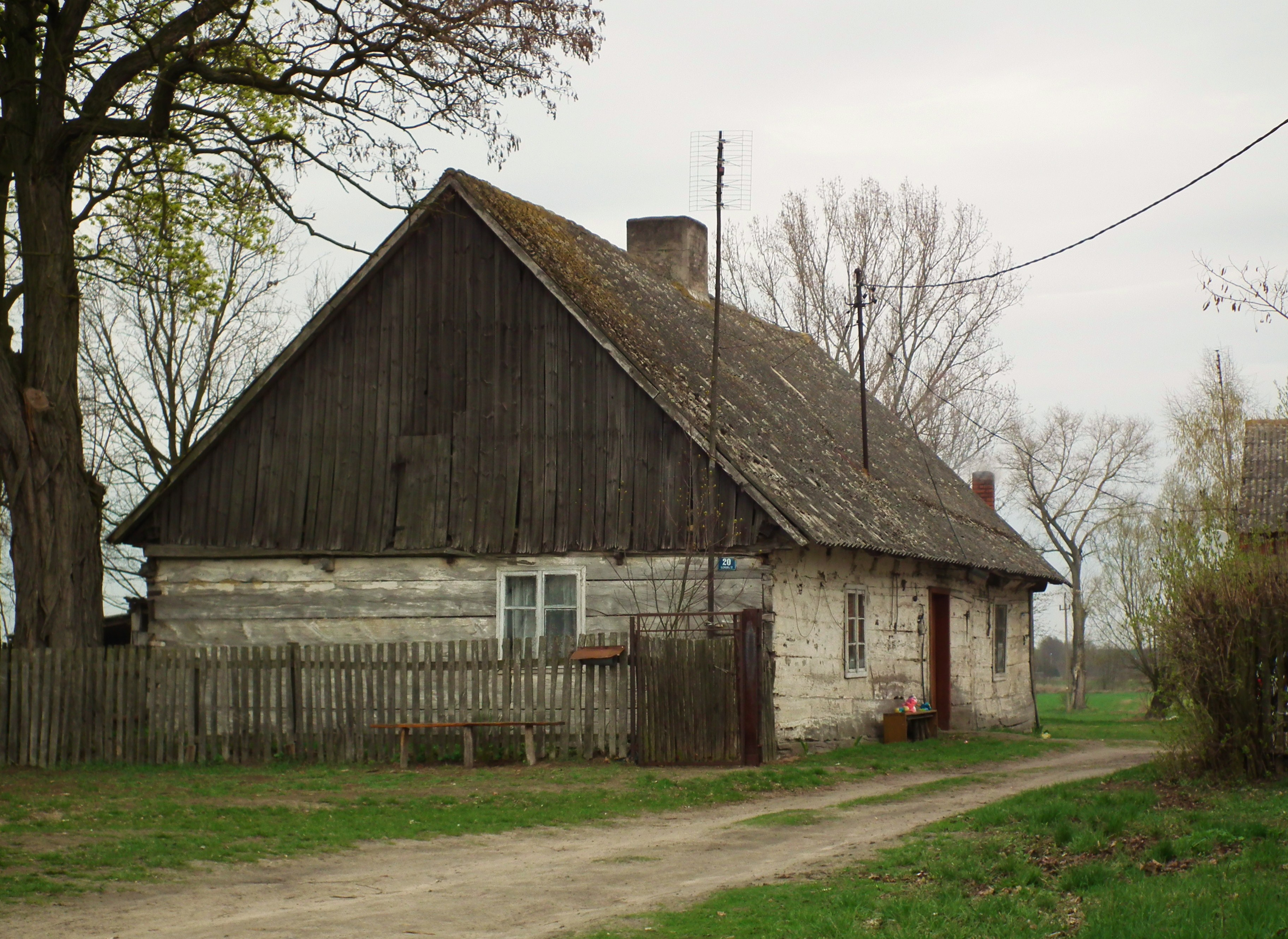

- Location within Poland
- Coordinates: 52°00′49.06″N 17°52′01.93″E
- Country: Poland
- Voivodeship: Greater Poland
- County: Pleszew
- Gmina: Chocz

Stara Kaźmierka [ˈstara kaʑˈmjɛrka] is a village in the administrative district of Gmina Chocz, within Pleszew County, Greater Poland Voivodeship, in west-central Poland.
