= Janków, Pleszew County =

Janków
- Village
- Location within Poland
- Coordinates: 51°50′26″N 17°50′12″E
- Country: Poland
- Voivodeship: Greater Poland
- County: Pleszew
- Gmina: Pleszew
- Population: 100

Janków [ˈjankuf] is a village in the administrative district of Gmina Pleszew, within Pleszew County, Greater Poland Voivodeship, in west-central Poland.
