= Korzkwy =

- Village
- Location within Poland
- Coordinates: 51°54′58″N 17°44′24″E
- Country: Poland
- Voivodeship: Greater Poland
- County: Pleszew
- Gmina: Pleszew

Korzkwy [ˈkɔʂkfɨ] is a village in the administrative district of Gmina Pleszew, within Pleszew County, Greater Poland Voivodeship, in west-central Poland.
