= Nowa Kaźmierka =

- Village
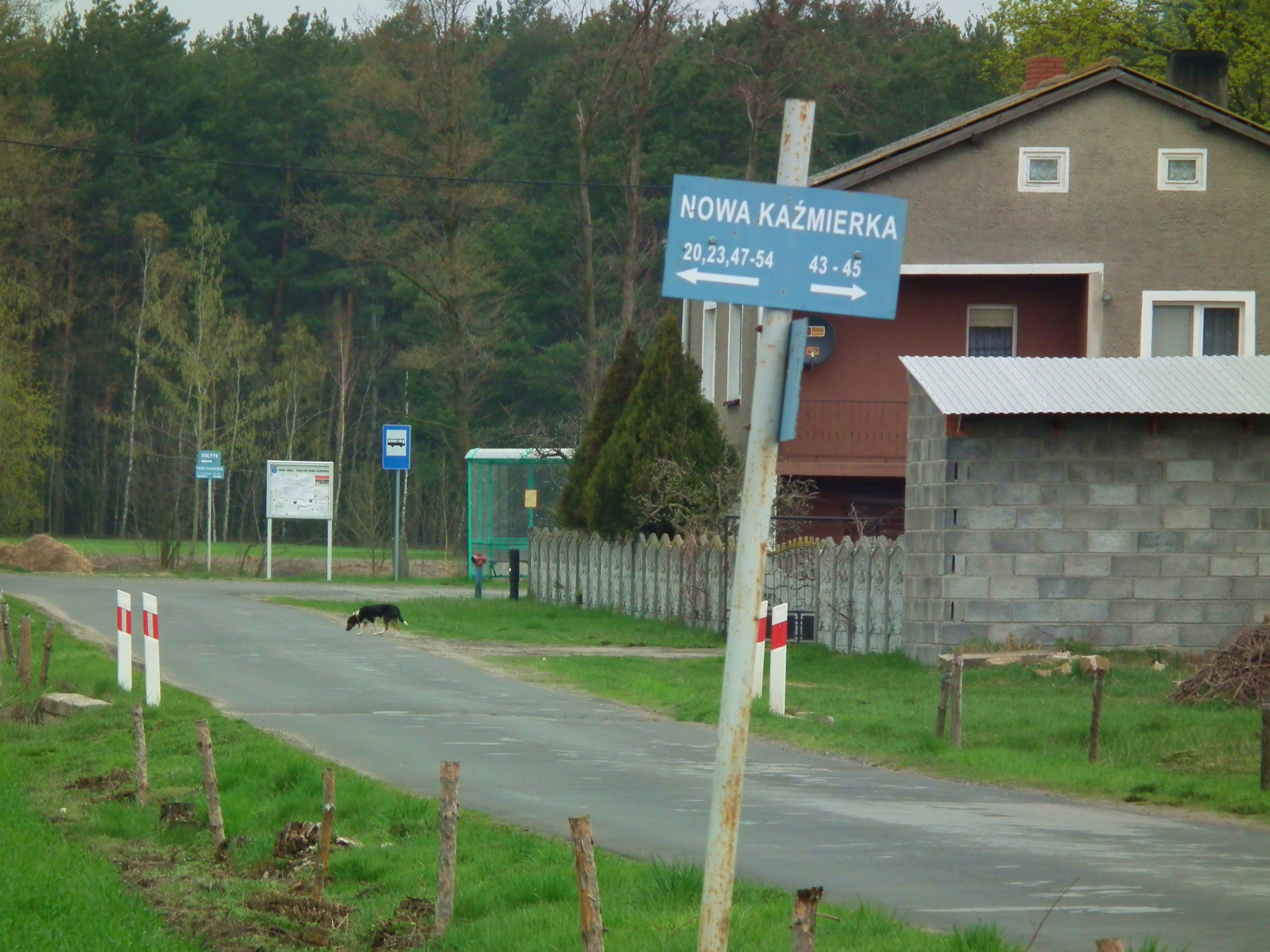
- Road sign in Nowa Kazmierka

- Location within Poland
- Coordinates: 52°01′05.41″N 17°51′06″E
- Country: Poland
- Voivodeship: Greater Poland
- County: Pleszew
- Gmina: Chocz

Nowa Kaźmierka [ˈnɔva kaʑˈmjɛrka] is a village in the administrative district of Gmina Chocz, within Pleszew County, Greater Poland Voivodeship, in west-central Poland.
