= Szymanowice, Greater Poland Voivodeship =

Szymanowice
- Village
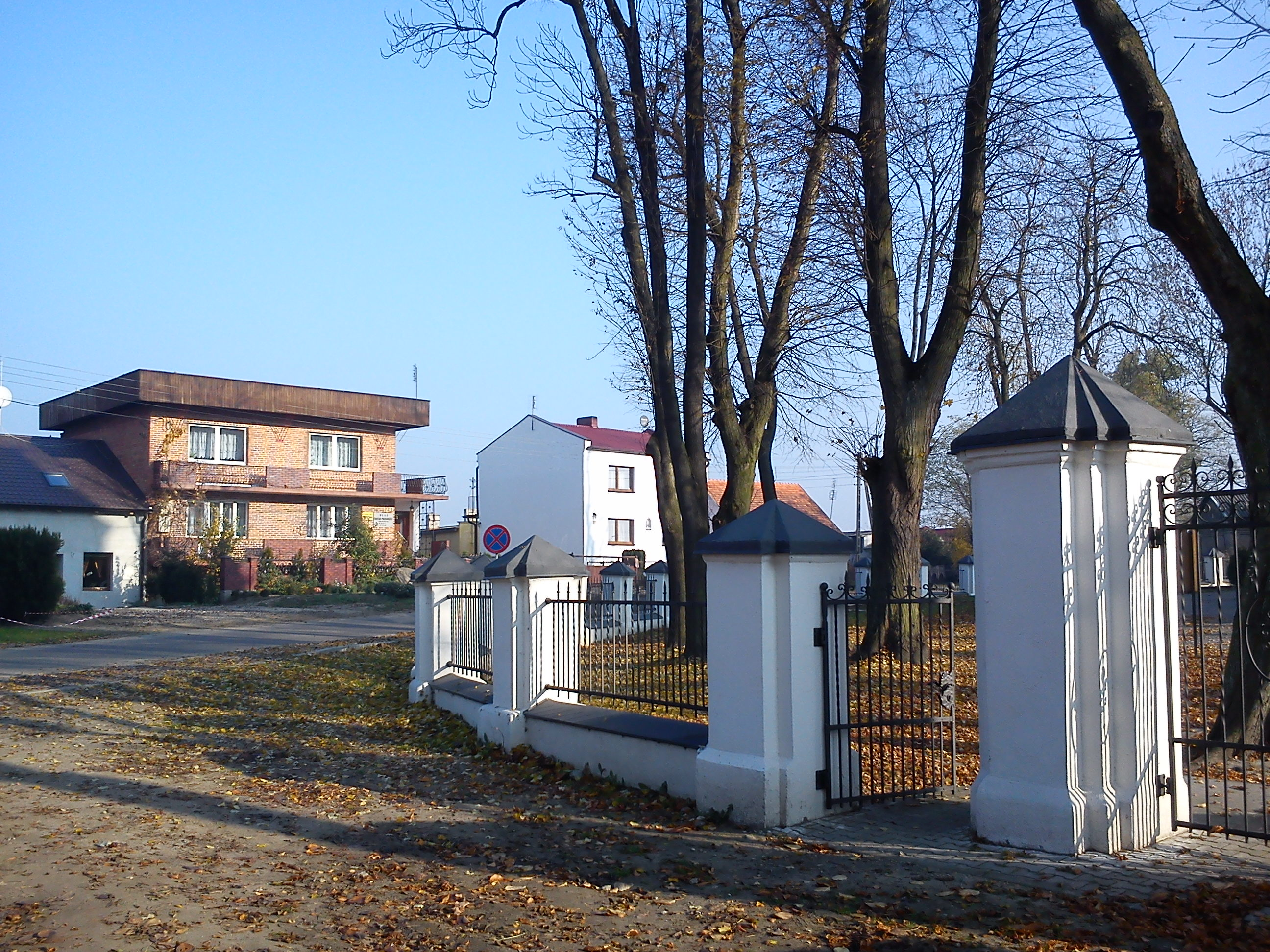

- Location within Poland
- Coordinates: 52°03′17″N 17°43′33″E
- Country: Poland
- Voivodeship: Greater Poland
- County: Pleszew
- Gmina: Gizałki

Szymanowice (Polish pronunciation: [ʂɨmanɔˈvit͡sɛ]) is a village in the administrative district of Gmina Gizałki, within Pleszew County, Greater Poland Voivodeship, in west-central Poland.
