= Zawidowice =

Zawidowice may refer to the following places in Poland:

- Zawidowice, Lower Silesian Voivodeship (south-west Poland)
- Zawidowice, Greater Poland Voivodeship (west-central Poland)
