= Tomice, Pleszew County =

Tomice
- Village
- Location within Poland
- Coordinates: 52°4′0″N 17°44′18″E
- Country: Poland
- Voivodeship: Greater Poland
- County: Pleszew
- Gmina: Gizałki
- Population (approx.): 586

Tomice [tɔˈmit͡sɛ] is a village in the administrative district of Gmina Gizałki, within Pleszew County, Greater Poland Voivodeship, in west-central Poland.
