= Grab, Pleszew County =

Grab
- Village
- Location within Poland
- Coordinates: 52°1′N 17°43′E
- Country: Poland
- Voivodeship: Greater Poland
- County: Pleszew
- Gmina: Czermin

Grab [ɡrap] is a village in the administrative district of Gmina Czermin, within Pleszew County, Greater Poland Voivodeship, in west-central Poland.
