= Sandivogius of Czechel =

Polish astronomer (1410–1476)

Sandivogius of Czechel (Polish: Sędziwój z Czechła; c. 1410– 1476) was a Polish astronomer and cartographer. He was a professor and Stobner Chair at the Kraków Academy. He is known for providing a precise orbit of the Moon by introducing an additional epycicle in the geocentric model.

== Life ==
Probably born in Czechel in the Kingdom of Poland.

He enrolled Kraków Academy in 1423. After graduating, he taught astronomy there from 1429 to 1431, he held the special astronomy Stobner Chair (named after medieval scholar Nicholas Stobner). He worked on revising the Alfonsine tables, that were considered inaccurate by the academy.

In 1430, he wrote a commentary to Gerard of Cremona's Theorica Planetarium from the 13th century. In his commentary, he proposed to use two epicycles to correct the orbit of the Moon in the geocentric model. A similar model was devised by another Kraków Academy professor Albert Brudzewski, half a century later. Their ideas were later expanded by Nicolaus Copernicus for other planets. This correction explained why the Moon always shows the same side to Earth.

Sandivogious also taught optics, based on the ideas of John Peckham. He wrote a popular a commentary to Peckham's Perspective communis. Sandivogius was a perspectivist, he aligned himself with Ibn al-Haytham and Vitello.

In 1431, Sandivogius left Cracow. He kept correspondence with his friend and historian Jan Długosz, who kept him in close contact with the academy.

In 1440, he wrote Chronica Polonorum, also known as the Code de Sędziwoj, presenting a detailed description of the geography and administrative division of Poland. Between 1443 and 1444 he studied in the College of Navarre in Paris, where he offered a copy of his Code. It contains one of the remaining transcripts of the Gesta principum Polonorum.

He also wrote Algorismus minutiarium and Algorismus proportionum.
