= Orlina Duża =

- Village
- Location within Poland
- Coordinates: 52°4′N 17°55′E
- Country: Poland
- Voivodeship: Greater Poland
- County: Pleszew
- Gmina: Gizałki

Orlina Duża [ɔrˈlina ˈduʐa] is a village in the administrative district of Gmina Gizałki, within Pleszew County, Greater Poland Voivodeship, in west-central Poland.
