= Gmina Gizałki =

Gmina Gizałki Gizałki Commune
- Gmina
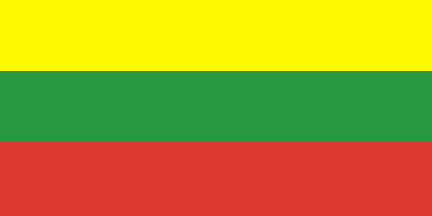
- Flag Coat of arms
- Interactive map of Gmina Gizałki
- Coordinates (Gizałki): 52°2′40″N 17°45′56″E
- Country: Poland
- Voivodeship: Greater Poland
- County: Pleszew
- Seat: Gizałki

Area
  - Total: 108.56 km^{2} (41.92 sq mi)

Population (2006)
  - Total: 4,628
  - Density: 42.63/km^{2} (110.4/sq mi)
- Website: https://www.gizalki.pl/

Gmina Gizałki is a rural gmina (administrative district) in Pleszew County, Greater Poland Voivodeship, in west-central Poland. Its seat is the village of Gizałki, which lies approximately 18 kilometres (11 mi) north of Pleszew and 71 km (44 mi) south-east of the regional capital Poznań.

The gmina covers an area of 108.56 square kilometres (41.9 sq mi), and as of 2006 its total population is 4,628.

== Villages ==
Gmina Gizałki contains the villages and settlements of Białobłoty, Czołnochów, Dziewin Duży, Gizałki, Gizałki-Las, Leszczyca, Nowa Wieś, Obory, Obory-Kolonia, Orlina Duża, Orlina Mała, Ostrowska Kolonia, Ruda Wieczyńska, Studzianka, Świerczyna, Szymanowice, Tomice, Tomice-Las, Tomice-Młynik, Toporów, Wierzchy and Wronów.

== Neighbouring gminas ==
Gmina Gizałki is bordered by the gminas of Chocz, Czermin, Grodziec, Pyzdry, Zagórów and Żerków.
