= Karmin, Pleszew County =

Karmin
- Village
- Location within Poland
- Coordinates: 51°50′11″N 17°41′22″E
- Country: Poland
- Voivodeship: Greater Poland
- County: Pleszew
- Gmina: Dobrzyca

Karmin [ˈkarmin] is a village in the administrative district of Gmina Dobrzyca, within Pleszew County, Greater Poland Voivodeship, in west-central Poland.
