= Białobłoty, Greater Poland Voivodeship =

Białobłoty
- Village
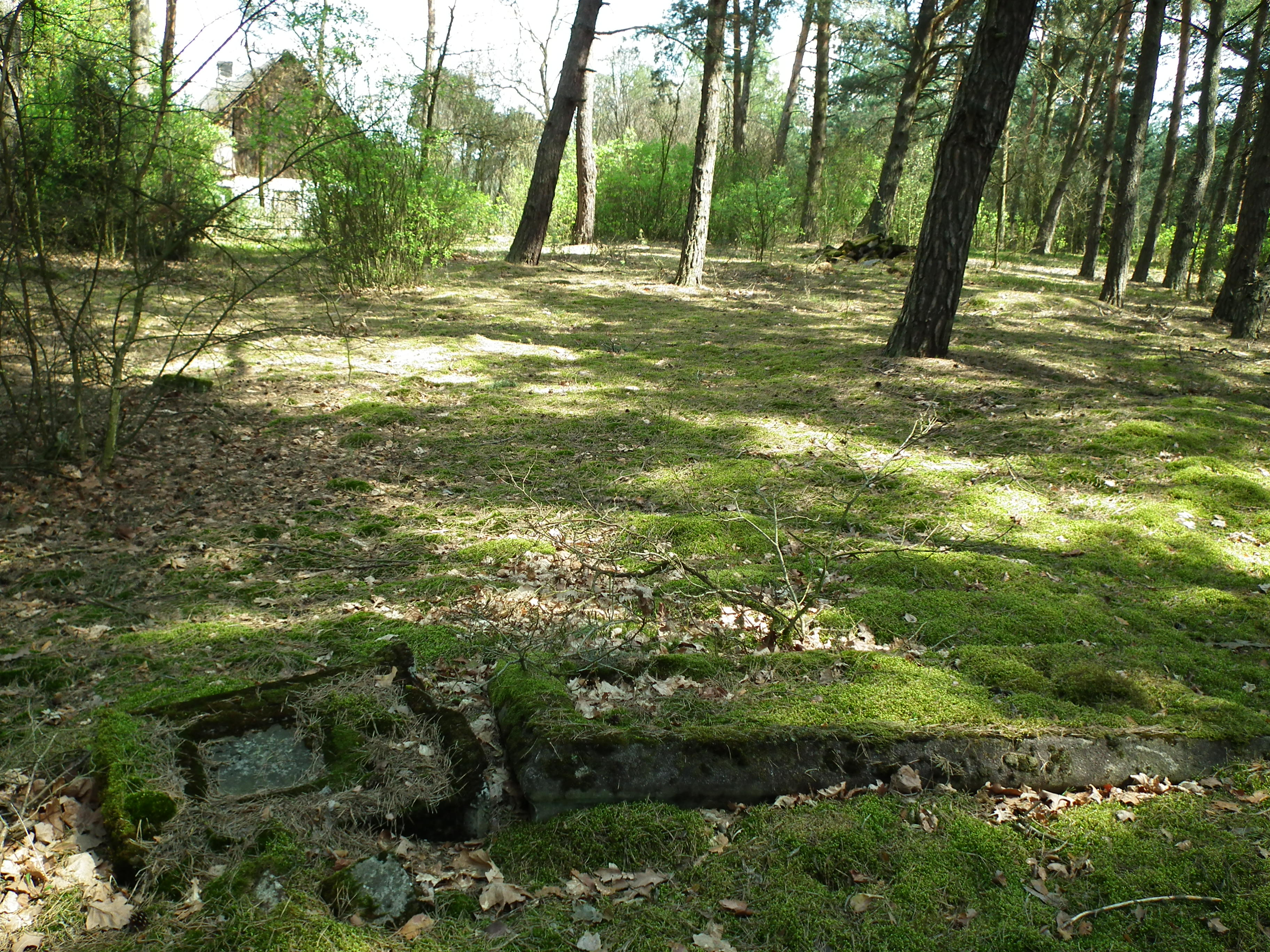

- Location within Poland
- Coordinates: 52°02′55″N 17°56′46″E
- Country: Poland
- Voivodeship: Greater Poland
- County: Pleszew
- Gmina: Gizałki
- Population: 500

Białobłoty [bjawɔˈbwɔtɨ] is a village in the administrative district of Gmina Gizałki, within Pleszew County, Greater Poland Voivodeship, in west-central Poland.
