= Nowy Karmin =

- Village
- Location within Poland
- Coordinates: 51°50′N 17°40′E
- Country: Poland
- Voivodeship: Greater Poland
- County: Pleszew
- Gmina: Dobrzyca

Nowy Karmin [ˈnɔvɨ ˈkarmin] is a village in the administrative district of Gmina Dobrzyca, within Pleszew County, Greater Poland Voivodeship, in west-central Poland.
