= Wierzchy =

Wierzchy may refer to the following places:

- Wierzchy, Kuyavian-Pomeranian Voivodeship (north-central Poland)
- Wierzchy, Łódź East County in Łódź Voivodeship (central Poland)
- Wierzchy, Poddębice County in Łódź Voivodeship (central Poland)
- Wierzchy, Masovian Voivodeship (east-central Poland)
- Wierzchy, Konin County in Greater Poland Voivodeship (west-central Poland)
- Wierzchy, Pleszew County in Greater Poland Voivodeship (west-central Poland)
- Wierzchy, Opole Voivodeship (south-west Poland)
- Wierzchy, West Pomeranian Voivodeship (north-west Poland)
