= Krzysztof Gawlik =

Polish serial killer

- Born: 1 January 1965 (age 61); Świerczyna, Pleszew County, Poland
- Other name: "Skorpion"
- Conviction: Murder
- Penalty: Life imprisonment

Details
- Victims: 5
- Span of crimes: February – March 2001; 1998 (claimed)
- Country: Poland

Krzysztof Gawlik (born 1 January 1965) is a Polish serial killer, nicknamed Scorpion (Polish: Skorpion). He killed five people in 2001 and was sentenced to life imprisonment. He attempted to escape prison twice, but was caught in the act both times.

== Biography ==
Gawlik was born in Świerczyna. His father was a miner, and his mother took care of the house. He experienced violence from an early age. His father, when not at work, drank alcohol and beat his wife. After finishing school, Gawlik was employed in the Julia coal mine in Wałbrzych, where he worked until 1996, when it was closed. Gawlik then set up his own company, which went bankrupt due to lack of funds.

He accumulated a debt of over 90,000zł in 1999. In June 2000, he was arrested on suspicion of robbery and was released on bail in January 2001, paid for by his wife.

== Murders ==
Krzysztof Gawlik got his nickname from murdering people with the Škorpion type silenced machine gun. Each victim was shot several times with a characteristic execution shot in the back of the head, along with some stabbing traces on the body. According to court psychologists, Gawlik killed because it gave him sadistic pleasure from watching the victims suffer.

Gawlik's first victim was a 17-year-old prostitute named Sylwia L. from Poznań. The murderer met her (apparently) on 6 February 2001, responding to an advertisement she placed in the press. Once in her apartment, Gawlik asked to use the toilet, and there he put the silencer on his gun. Gawlik shot Sylwia twice—once in the head and once in the heart. Her neighbour testified that she heard loud music and a scream coming from Sylwia's apartment on the day of the murder, but she did not suspect anything out of the ordinary because she knew that Sylwia was servicing clients. Sylwia's corpse was found on 7 February, with her head lying in a large pool of blood and her body positioned towards the front door. Her murder was ordered by the mafia, who paid Gawlik to kill her.

The next victims of "Skorpion" were Ukrainian Lesia (Note: Also reported as Lesja or Lesya) H., a prostitute working in Wrocław and Tomasz S., a man associated with her. He shot them three days after committing the first crime, according to various sources in a public house of their apartment in Wrocław. Lesia was shot five times and Tomasz was shot three times. A neighbour said that she heard heavy objects being moved around, which turned out to be the sound of Gawlik moving the corpses. He found them through an advertisement in the newspaper for an escort agency. Tomasz was likely tortured while still alive—he had multiple stab wounds in his torso and Gawlik had slit his throat.

In March 2001, Gawlik killed another two people—a married couple from Wrocław, whom he most likely found by responding to their car sales offer or offer to rent an apartment of theirs. When they had agreed upon the rent amount and the couple wanted payment in advance, Gawlik apologized and excused himself to the toilet, where he put the silencer on his gun. Jan K. was shot four times and his wife Barbara was shot six times.

It was initially suspected that Gawlik may have murdered two university students, Anna Kembrowska and Robert Odżga, on a mountain trail in the Stołowe Mountains near Karłów in 1997, but this was later disproven.

== Arrest and trial ==
Gawlik was detained at the end of March 2001, when under the influence of alcohol he caused an accident and tried to flee from the scene. The police discovered a pistol with a silencer in his car, which was used to commit the five homicides. Gawlik initially confessed to the killings; he claimed that he first started killing in 1998 because he enjoyed to watch people die in front of his eyes. The trial began in 2002. However, Gawlik withdrew his testimony and claimed that he only killed one person, that he was witness to three murders, and that he had nothing to do with the Poznań murder. He also claimed that the murder he committed was carried out on behalf of a certain amount of profit and drug trafficking.

He was sentenced to life imprisonment with limited possibilities for conditional release, which he could apply for not earlier than fifty years, while the prosecutor demanded a 40-year limitation. Gawlik did not show remorse and decided not to exercise his right to appeal, which is a sensation in the event of a conviction for such a long sentence.

== Imprisonment ==
Gawlik was imprisoned in the Wołów Prison. In 2004, during a search of his cell, prison guards prevented him from escaping from his cell. Using a tube and a flat bar torn from the bed, he tried to make a hole in the cell wall. According to the officers, though the escape from his cell was very close to success, trained dogs and armed guards on the wall surrounding the prison would have likely stopped him if he was successful in leaving his cell. He made a second escape attempt at a prison in Wrocław in 2021, where he unseated the barred window in his cell and tried to climb out of it, assisted by the fact his cell was on the ground floor. He was caught after guards noticed him escaping his cell. He had also prepared a hooked rope to scale the prison wall with.

He will be allowed to apply for conditional release after 2050.

== See also ==
- List of serial killers by country
