= Czechel =

- Village
- Location within Poland
- Coordinates: 51°48′N 17°56′E
- Country: Poland
- Voivodeship: Greater Poland
- County: Pleszew
- Gmina: Gołuchów
- Elevation: 128 m (420 ft)
- Population: 277

Czechel [ˈt͡ʂɛxɛl] is a village in the administrative district of Gmina Gołuchów, within Pleszew County, Greater Poland Voivodeship, in west-central Poland.
