= Gmina Gołuchów =

Gmina Gołuchów Gołuchów Commune
- Gmina
- Coat of arms
- Interactive map of Gmina Gołuchów
- Coordinates (Gołuchów): 51°50′58″N 17°55′53″E
- Country: Poland
- Voivodeship: Greater Poland
- County: Pleszew
- Seat: Gołuchów

Area
  - Total: 135.45 km^{2} (52.30 sq mi)

Population (2006)
  - Total: 9,703
  - Density: 71.64/km^{2} (185.5/sq mi)
- Website: www.goluchow.pl

Gmina Gołuchów is a rural gmina (administrative district) in Pleszew County, Greater Poland Voivodeship, in west-central Poland. Its seat is the village of Gołuchów, which lies approximately 11 kilometres (7 mi) east of Pleszew and 93 km (58 mi) south-east of the regional capital Poznań.

The gmina covers an area of 135.45 square kilometres (52.3 sq mi), and as of 2006 its total population is 9,703.

== Villages ==
Gmina Gołuchów contains the villages and settlements of Bielawy, Bogusławice, Borczysko, Cieśle, Czechel, Czerminek, Gołuchów, Jedlec, Kajew, Karsy, Kościelna Wieś, Krzywosądów, Kucharki, Kuchary, Macew, Pleszówka, Popówek, Szkudła, Tursko, Wszołów and Żychlin.

== Neighbouring gminas ==
Gmina Gołuchów is bordered by the city of Kalisz and by the gminas of Blizanów, Nowe Skalmierzyce, Ostrów Wielkopolski and Pleszew.
