= Studzianka, Greater Poland Voivodeship =

Studzianka
- Village
- Location within Poland
- Coordinates: 52°04′23″N 17°52′08″E
- Country: Poland
- Voivodeship: Greater Poland
- County: Pleszew
- Gmina: Gizałki

Studzianka [stuˈd͡ʑanka] is a village in the administrative district of Gmina Gizałki, within Pleszew County, Greater Poland Voivodeship, in west-central Poland.
