= Borucin, Greater Poland Voivodeship =

Borucin
- Village
- Location within Poland
- Coordinates: 51°48′39″N 17°49′17″E
- Country: Poland
- Voivodeship: Greater Poland
- County: Pleszew
- Gmina: Pleszew

Borucin [bɔˈrut͡ɕin] is a village in the administrative district of Gmina Pleszew, within Pleszew County, Greater Poland Voivodeship, in west-central Poland.
