= Gizałki =

- Village
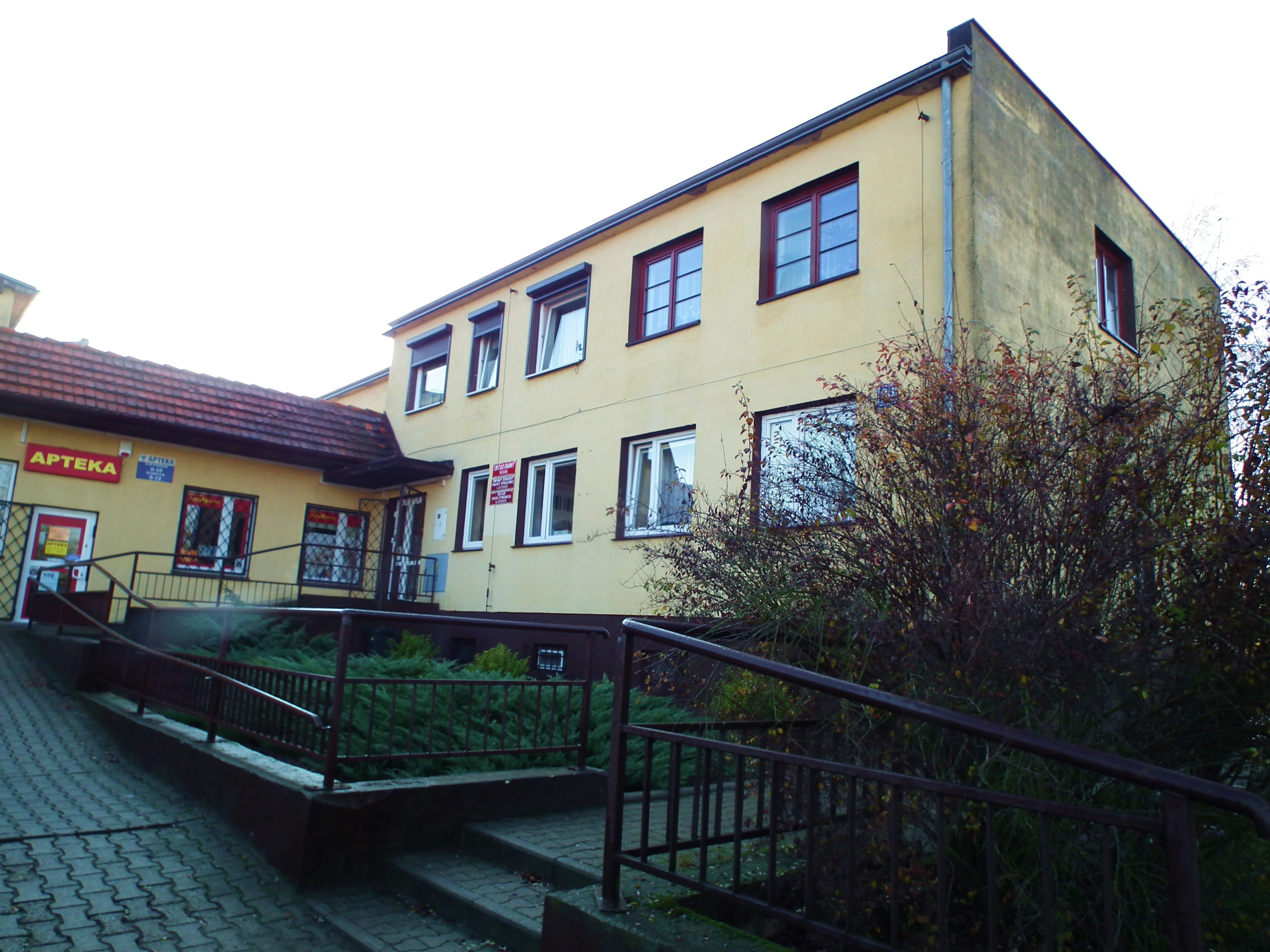
- Gmina Gizałki administration building

- Location within Poland
- Coordinates: 52°2′41″N 17°45′57″E
- Country: Poland
- Voivodeship: Greater Poland
- County: Pleszew
- Gmina: Gizałki

Population
  - Total: 583

Gizałki [ɡiˈzau̯ki] is a village in Pleszew County, Greater Poland Voivodeship, in west-central Poland. It is the seat of the gmina (administrative district) called Gmina Gizałki.
