= Chocz, Greater Poland Voivodeship =

Chocz
- Town
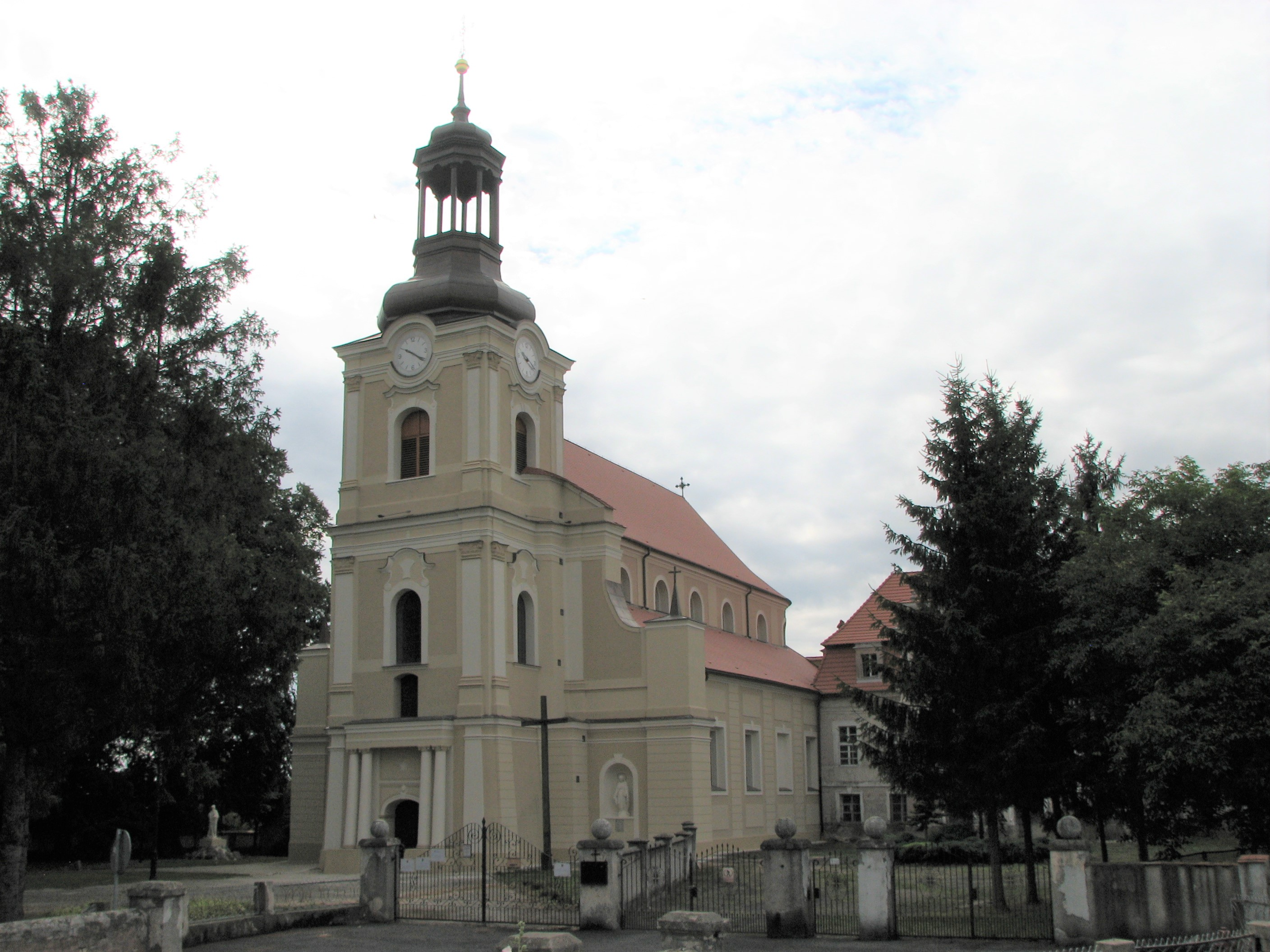
- Church of the Assumption in Chocz

- Flag Coat of arms

- Location within Poland
- Coordinates: 51°58′N 17°52′E
- Country: Poland
- Voivodeship: Greater Poland
- County: Pleszew
- Gmina: Chocz
- Town rights: before 1382

Government
  - Mayor: Marian Dariusz Wielgosik

Area
  - Total: 6.88 km^{2} (2.66 sq mi)
- Elevation: 94 m (308 ft)

Population (31 December 2021)
  - Total: 1,746
  - Density: 254/km^{2} (657/sq mi)
- Time zone: UTC+1 (CET)
  - Summer (DST): UTC+2 (CEST)
- Postal code: 63-313
- Area code: +48 62
- Car plates: PPL
- Website: http://www.chocz.pl

Chocz [xɔt͡ʂ] is a town in Pleszew County, Greater Poland Voivodeship, in west-central Poland. It is the seat of the gmina (administrative district) called Gmina Chocz.

== History ==
Chocz, in the past also known as Chodecz, was granted town rights before 1382. It was a private town, administratively located in the Pyzdry County in the Kalisz Voivodeship in the Greater Poland Province of the Kingdom of Poland.

Following the German-Soviet invasion of Poland, which started World War II in September 1939, it was occupied by Germany until 1945. The local Polish police chief was murdered by the Russians in the Katyn massacre in 1940.

Chocz regained town rights on January 1, 2015.

== Demographics ==
Detailed data as of 31 December 2021:

Description	All		Women		Men	
Unit	person	percentage	person	percentage	person	percentage
Population	1746	100	861	49.3%	885	50.7%
Population density	253.8		125.2		128.6	

According to the 1921 Polish census, the population was 96.8% Polish and 3% Jewish.

=== Number of inhabitants by year ===
Historical population

Year	Pop.	±%
1890	1,776	—
1897	1,587	−10.6%
1910	1,981	+24.8%
2015	1,802	−9.0%
2016	1,799	−0.2%

Year	Pop.	±%
2017	1,811	+0.7%
2018	1,777	−1.9%
2019	1,787	+0.6%
2020	1,769	−1.0%
2021	1,746	−1.3%

== Transport ==
Chocz lies on voivodeship road 442.

The nearest railway station is in Pleszew to the south-west.
