= Gmina Chocz =

Gmina Chocz Chocz Commune
- Gmina
- Flag Coat of arms
- Interactive map of Gmina Chocz
- Coordinates (Chocz): 51°58′N 17°52′E
- Country: Poland
- Voivodeship: Greater Poland
- County: Pleszew
- Seat: Chocz

Area
  - Total: 73.41 km^{2} (28.34 sq mi)

Population (2006)
  - Total: 4,780
  - Density: 65.1/km^{2} (169/sq mi)

Gmina Chocz is a rural gmina (administrative district) in Pleszew County, Greater Poland Voivodeship, in west-central Poland. Its seat is the town of Chocz, which lies approximately 11 kilometres (7 mi) north-east of Pleszew and 81 km (50 mi) south-east of the regional capital Poznań.

The gmina covers an area of 73.41 square kilometres (28.3 sq mi), and as of 2006 its total population is 4,780.

== Villages ==
Gmina Chocz contains the villages and settlements of Brudzewek, Chocz, Józefów, Kuźnia, Kwileń, Niniew, Nowa Kaźmierka, Nowolipsk, Nowy Olesiec, Piła, Stara Kaźmierka and Stary Olesiec.

== Neighbouring gminas ==
Gmina Chocz is bordered by the gminas of Blizanów, Czermin, Gizałki, Grodziec and Pleszew.
