= Gmina Czermin, Greater Poland Voivodeship =

Gmina Czermin Czermin Commune
- Gmina
- Coat of arms
- Interactive map of Gmina Czermin
- Coordinates (Czermin): 51°57′N 17°45′E
- Country: Poland
- Voivodeship: Greater Poland
- County: Pleszew
- Seat: Czermin

Area
  - Total: 97.83 km^{2} (37.77 sq mi)

Population (2006)
  - Total: 4,811
  - Density: 49.18/km^{2} (127.4/sq mi)
- Website: http://www.czermin.wlkp.pl/

Gmina Czermin is a rural gmina (administrative district) in Pleszew County, Greater Poland Voivodeship, in west-central Poland. Its seat is the village of Czermin, which lies approximately 8 kilometres (5 mi) north of Pleszew and 76 km (47 mi) south-east of the regional capital Poznań.

The gmina covers an area of 97.83 square kilometres (37.8 sq mi), and as of 2006 its total population is 4,811.

== Villages ==
Gmina Czermin contains the villages and settlements of Broniszewice, Czermin, Grab, Łęg, Mamoty, Pieruchy, Pieruszyce, Psienie-Ostrów, Skrzypna, Strzydzew, Wieczyn, Wola Duchowna, Żale, Żbiki and Żegocin.

== Neighbouring gminas ==
Gmina Czermin is bordered by the gminas of Chocz, Gizałki, Kotlin, Pleszew and Żerków.
