= Gmina Dobrzyca =

Gmina Dobrzyca Dobrzyca Commune
- Gmina
- Flag Coat of arms

- Coordinates (Dobrzyca): 51°51′54″N 17°36′7″E
- Country: Poland
- Voivodeship: Greater Poland
- County: Pleszew
- Seat: Dobrzyca

Area
  - Total: 117 km^{2} (45 sq mi)

Population (2006)
  - Total: 8,239
  - Density: 70.4/km^{2} (182/sq mi)
- Website: https://gminadobrzyca.pl/

Gmina Dobrzyca is a rural gmina (administrative district) in Pleszew County, Greater Poland Voivodeship, in west-central Poland. Its seat is the village of Dobrzyca, which lies approximately 13 kilometres (8 mi) west of Pleszew and 76 km (47 mi) south-east of the regional capital Poznań.

The gmina covers an area of 117 square kilometres (45.2 sq mi), and as of 2006 its total population is 8,239.

== Villages ==
Gmina Dobrzyca contains the villages and settlements of Czarnuszka, Dobrzyca, Dobrzyca-Nowy Świat, Fabianów, Galew, Gustawów, Izbiczno, Karmin, Karminek, Karminiec, Koźminiec, Lutynia, Nowy Karmin, Polskie Olędry, Ruda, Sośnica, Sośniczka, Strzyżew, Trzebin and Trzebowa.

== Neighbouring gminas ==
Gmina Dobrzyca is bordered by the gminas of Jarocin, Kotlin, Koźmin Wielkopolski, Krotoszyn, Pleszew, Raszków and Rozdrażew.
