= Wieczyn =

- Village
- Location within Poland
- Coordinates: 52°0′N 17°45′E
- Country: Poland
- Voivodeship: Greater Poland
- County: Pleszew
- Gmina: Czermin
- Population: 420

Wieczyn [ˈvjɛt͡ʂɨn] is a village in the administrative district of Gmina Czermin, within Pleszew County, Greater Poland Voivodeship, in west-central Poland.
