= Karmin (disambiguation) =

Karmin was a musical duo from Boston, Massachusetts.

Karmin may also refer to:

== People ==
- Mati Karmin (born 1959), Estonian architect

== Places ==
- Karmin, Kościan County in Greater Poland Voivodeship (west-central Poland)
- Karmin, Pleszew County in Greater Poland Voivodeship (west-central Poland)
- Karmin, Szamotuły County in Greater Poland Voivodeship (west-central Poland)
