= Gmina Pleszew =

Gmina Pleszew Pleszew Commune
- Gmina
- Flag Coat of arms
- Interactive map of Gmina Pleszew
- Coordinates (Pleszew): 51°53′N 17°47′E
- Country: Poland
- Voivodeship: Greater Poland
- County: Pleszew
- Seat: Pleszew

Area
  - Total: 180.15 km^{2} (69.56 sq mi)

Population (2006)
  - Total: 29,790
  - Density: 165.4/km^{2} (428.3/sq mi)
  - Urban: 17,787
  - Rural: 12,003
- Website: http://www.pleszew.pl/

Gmina Pleszew is an urban-rural gmina (administrative district) in Pleszew County, Greater Poland Voivodeship, in west-central Poland. Its seat is the town of Pleszew, which lies approximately 83 kilometres (52 mi) south-east of the regional capital Poznań.

The gmina covers an area of 180.15 square kilometres (69.6 sq mi), and as of 2006 its total population is 29,790 (out of which the population of Pleszew amounts to 17,787, and the population of the rural part of the gmina is 12,003).

== Villages ==
Apart from the town of Pleszew, Gmina Pleszew contains the villages and settlements of Baranówek, Bógwidze, Borucin, Bronów, Brzezie, Dobra Nadzieja, Grodzisko, Janków, Korzkwy, Kowalew, Kuczków, Lenartowice, Ludwina, Marszew, Nowa Wieś, Pacanowice, Piekarzew, Prokopów, Rokutów, Sowina, Sowina Błotna, Suchorzew, Taczanów Drugi, Taczanów Pierwszy, Zawady, Zawidowice and Zielona Łąka.

== Neighbouring gminas ==
Gmina Pleszew is bordered by the gminas of Blizanów, Chocz, Czermin, Dobrzyca, Gołuchów, Kotlin, Ostrów Wielkopolski and Raszków.
