= Sowina Błotna =

- Village
- Location within Poland
- Coordinates: 51°50′N 17°48′E
- Country: Poland
- Voivodeship: Greater Poland
- County: Pleszew
- Gmina: Pleszew

Sowina Błotna [sɔˈvina ˈbwɔtna] is a village in the administrative district of Gmina Pleszew, within Pleszew County, Greater Poland Voivodeship, in west-central Poland.
