= Wierzchy, Pleszew County =

Wierzchy
- Village
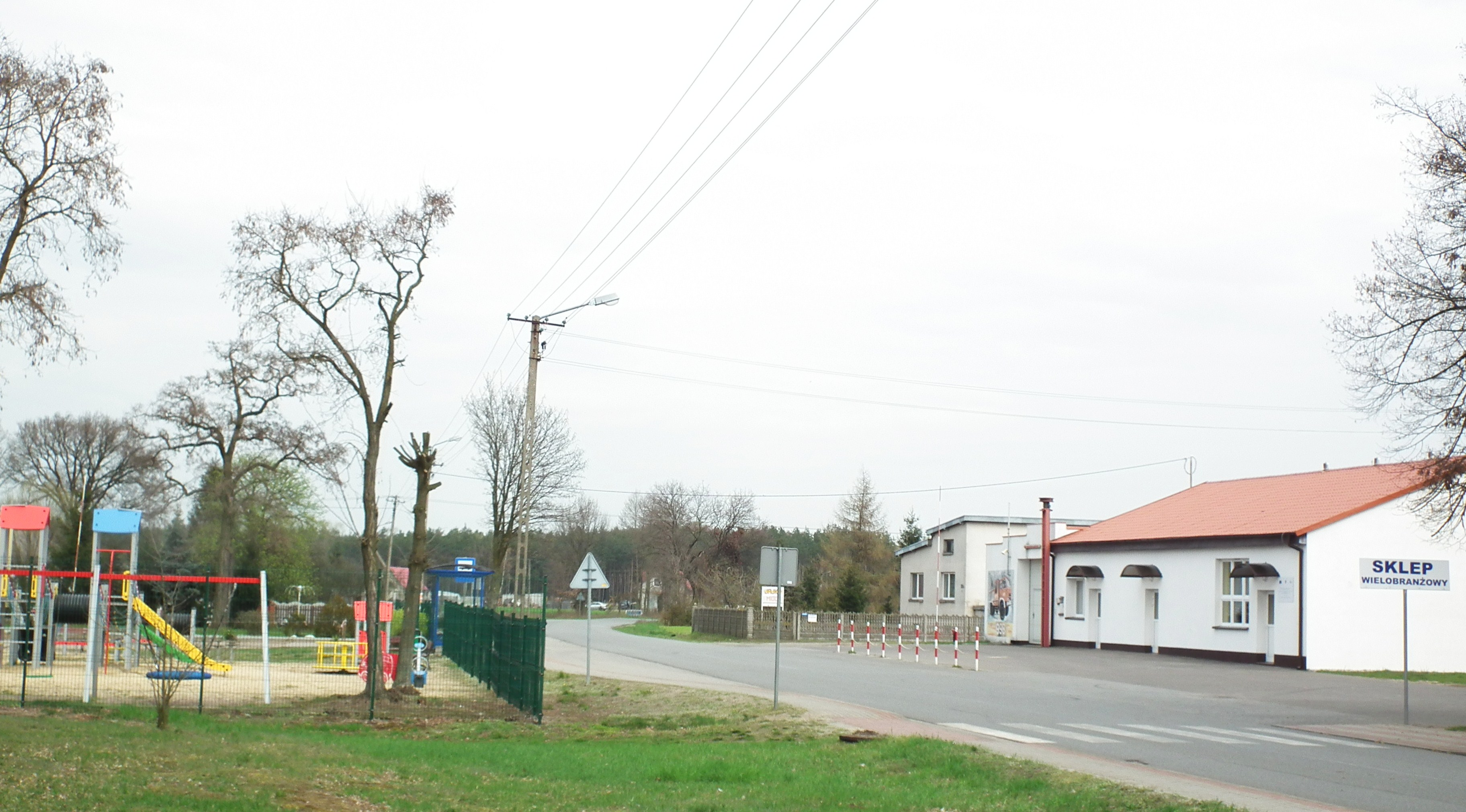

- Location within Poland
- Coordinates: 52°03′49″N 17°48′19″E
- Country: Poland
- Voivodeship: Greater Poland
- County: Pleszew
- Gmina: Gizałki

Wierzchy [ˈvjɛʂxɨ] is a village in the administrative district of Gmina Gizałki, within Pleszew County, Greater Poland Voivodeship, in west-central Poland.
