= Czermin, Pleszew County =

Czermin
- Village
- Location within Poland
- Coordinates: 51°57′N 17°45′E
- Country: Poland
- Voivodeship: Greater Poland
- County: Pleszew
- Gmina: Czermin

Czermin [ˈt͡ʂɛrmin] is a village in Pleszew County, Greater Poland Voivodeship, in west-central Poland. It is the seat of the gmina (administrative district) called Gmina Czermin.
