= Choryń =

- Village
- Location within Poland
- Coordinates: 52°2′26″N 16°46′59″E
- Country: Poland
- Voivodeship: Greater Poland
- County: Kościan
- Gmina: Kościan
- Population: 415

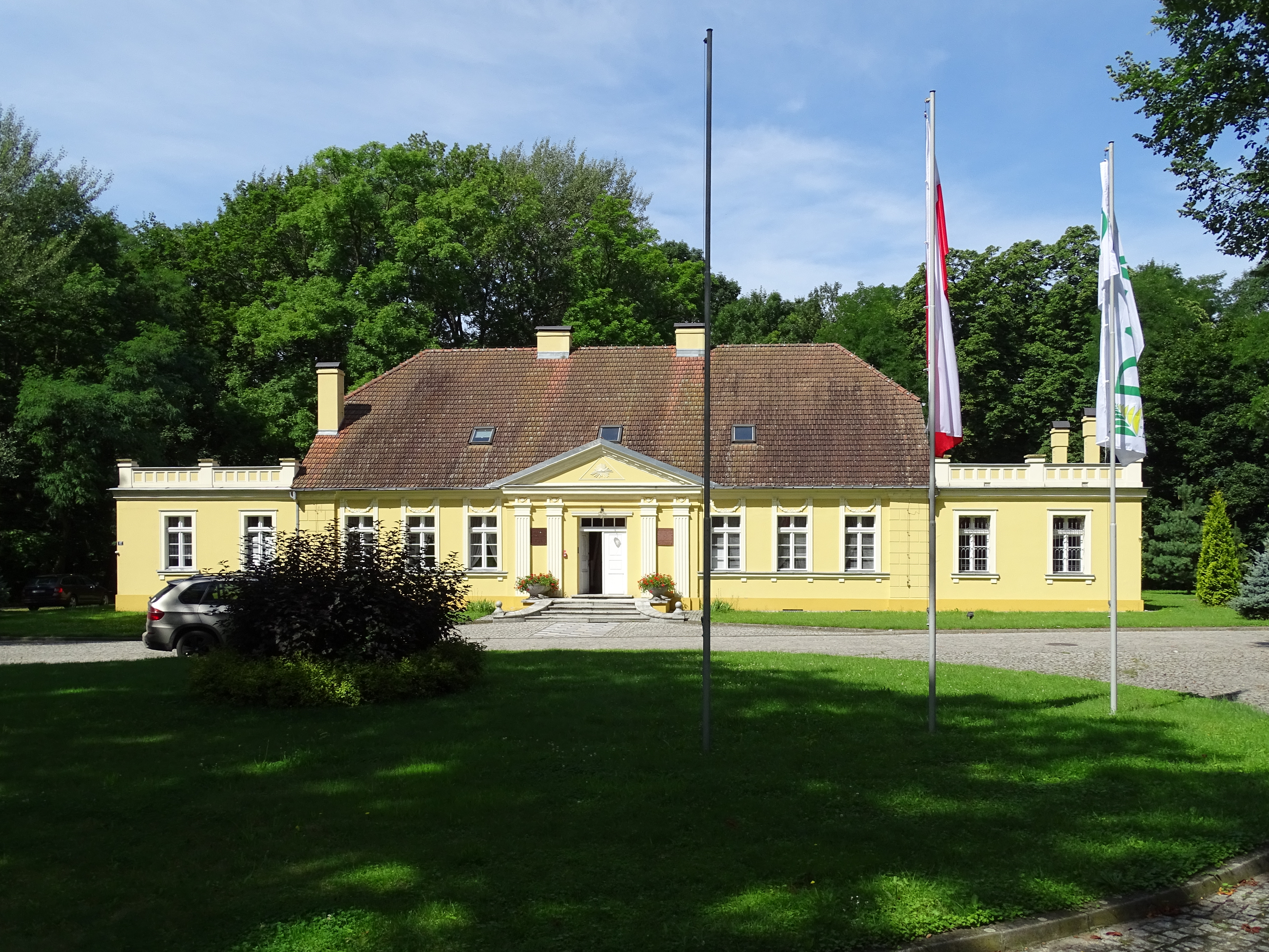
The manor house. Built in the late eighteenth century.

Choryń [ˈxɔrɨɲ] is a village in the administrative district of Gmina Kościan, within Kościan County, Greater Poland Voivodeship, in west-central Poland.
