= Pleszew County =

Pleszew County Powiat pleszewski
- County
- Flag Coat of arms

- Location within the voivodeship
- Coordinates (Pleszew): 51°53′N 17°47′E
- Country: Poland
- Voivodeship: Greater Poland
- Seat: Pleszew
- Gminas: Total 6: Gmina Chocz; Gmina Czermin; Gmina Dobrzyca; Gmina Gizałki; Gmina Gołuchów; Gmina Pleszew

Area
  - Total: 711.91 km^{2} (274.87 sq mi)

Population (2006)
  - Total: 61,951
  - Density: 87.021/km^{2} (225.38/sq mi)
  - Urban: 17,787
  - Rural: 44,164
- Car plates: PPL
- Website: www.powiatpleszewski.pl

Pleszew County (Polish: powiat pleszewski) is a unit of territorial administration and local government (powiat) in Greater Poland Voivodeship, west-central Poland. It came into being on January 1, 1999, as a result of the Polish local government reforms passed in 1998. Its administrative seat is the town of Pleszew, which lies 83 kilometres (52 mi) south-east of the regional capital Poznań.

The county covers an area of 711.91 square kilometres (274.9 sq mi). As of 2006 its total population is 61,951, out of which the population of Pleszew is 17,787 and the rural population is 44,164.

== Neighbouring counties ==
Pleszew County is bordered by Września County and Słupca County to the north, Konin County to the north-east, the city of Kalisz and Kalisz County to the south-east, Ostrów County to the south, Krotoszyn County to the south-west, and Jarocin County to the west.

== Administrative divisions ==
The county is subdivided into six gminas (three urban-rural and three rural). These are listed in the following table, in descending order of population.

Gmina	Type	Area (km^{2})	Population (2006)	Seat
Gmina Pleszew	urban-rural	180.2	29,790	Pleszew
Gmina Gołuchów	rural	135.5	9,703	Gołuchów
Gmina Dobrzyca	urban-rural	117.0	8,239	Dobrzyca
Gmina Czermin	rural	97.8	4,811	Czermin
Gmina Chocz	urban-rural	73.4	4,780	Chocz
Gmina Gizałki	rural	108.6	4,628	Gizałki
