= Alfred von Niezychowski =

American writer (1888–1964)

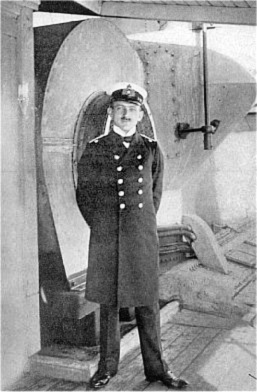
- Lieutenant Alfred von Niezychowski aboard the German liner Kronprinz Wilhelm
- Born: July 28, 1888; Poznań, Poland
- Died: June 13, 1964 (aged 75); Michigan, U.S.
- Occupations: Lieutenant, Author, Lecturer, Politician
- Spouse: Nanine H. Ulman (m. 1923)

Signature
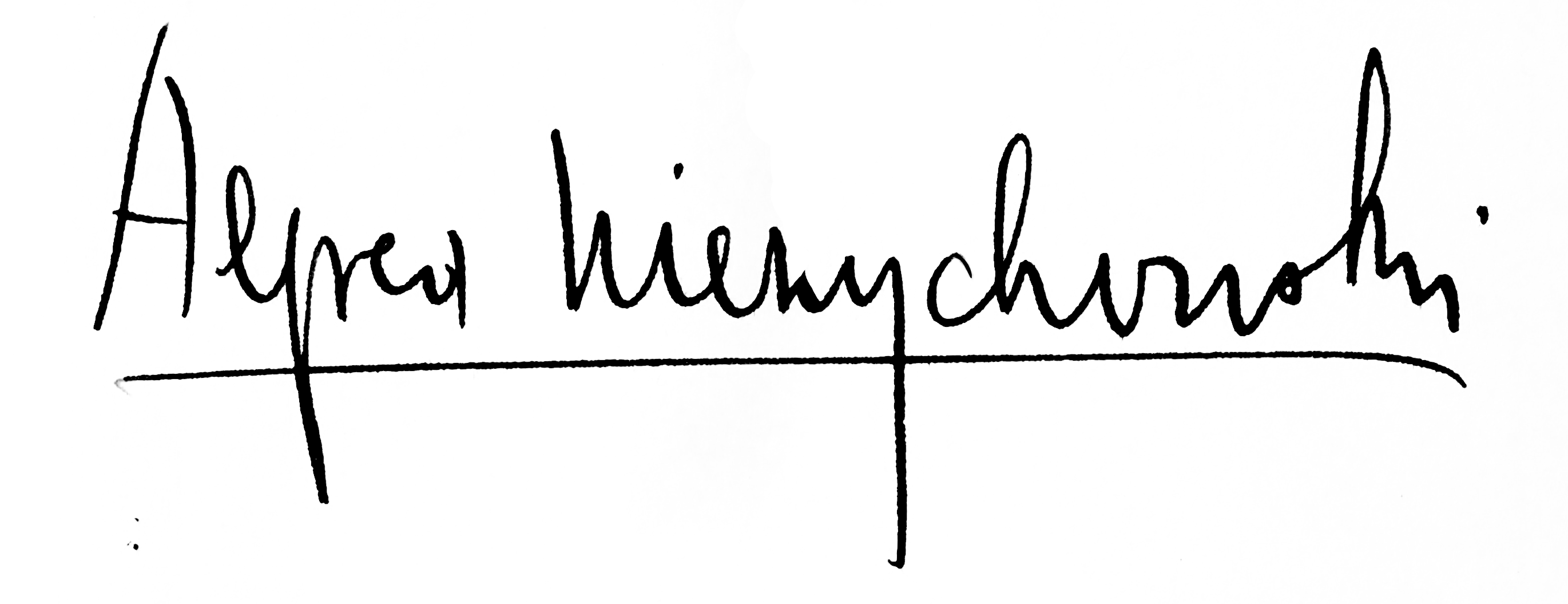

Alfred Graf von Niezychowski (July 28, 1888 – June 13, 1964) was a German count of Polish descent, a lieutenant commander of a German commerce raider ship during World War I, an author and lecturer, and a Michigan political candidate for public office.

== Childhood ==
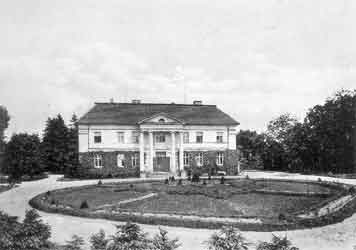
Granówko, Niezychowski's childhood home

Niezychowski was born near Posen, Germany (now Poznań, Poland), the fourth child out of six to Stanisław Nieżychowski (1851–1897) and Lucia (Łucja) Taczanowska (1862–1917).

Niezychowski's father died when he was nine years old. Two years later, his mother, now 37 years old, married the 29-year-old Count Rodryg Dunin, and had four more children. They lived on the Granówko estate, near Poznań. Niezychowski was educated at the German military school at Wahlstadt, Silesia, and at the naval schools at Danzig (Gdańsk) and Kiel. His oldest brother, Count Josef von Niezychowski, initially attained high rank in the army, but at the outbreak of World War II changed his allegiance and served as a general in the Polish Army.

== Career ==
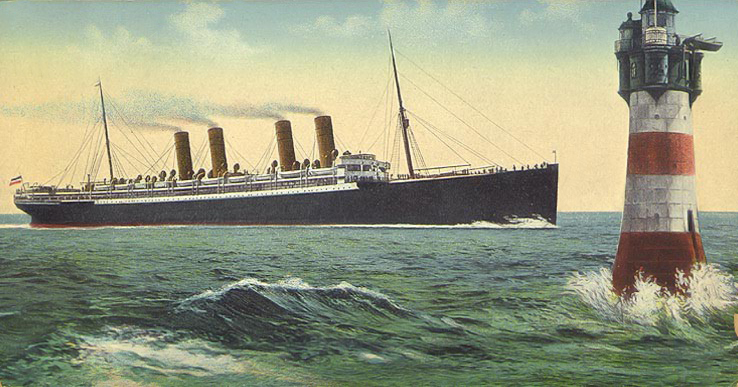
The German passenger liner Kronprinz Wilhelm

As an adult, Niezychowski joined the German merchant marine of the Hamburg-American Line, and was an officer on such ships as the Hamburg-American liner Victoria Louise and the North German Lloyd liner Prinzess Irene in 1914, before being transferred to his most famous assignment, the German passenger liner Kronprinz Wilhelm, where he held the rank of lieutenant. He was later promoted to lieutenant commander in the German naval reserve and became second in command. The ship was one of the fastest in the world, having won the Blue Riband a few years earlier for the fastest-ever Atlantic crossing, in 5 days, 11 hours, and 57 minutes.

Germany entered World War I in August 1914, while the ship was in port in New York City, and the Kronprinz Wilhelm was ordered into service with the Imperial German Navy as an auxiliary cruiser. She left port and rendezvoused with the SMS Karlsruhe to have deck guns installed, and then spent the next 251 days capturing and sinking commercial vessels off the coast of South America, while simultaneously evading capture by the Allies. The ship eventually ran out of supplies, and dozens of the men in her crew had become sick with beri-beri from the restricted diet on the long voyage. Her captain headed for Virginia, and successfully evading the British ships guarding the port, entered safe harbor at Newport News, in 1915. At the Norfolk Navy Yard, the ship and crew were originally interned as neutrals by the United States, until that country entered the war in 1917. At that time, Niezychowski and the rest of the crew became American prisoners of war and the ship was officially seized by the US Navy. Renamed the USS Von Steuben, she was turned into a troopship.

== American citizenship ==
Despite officially being a prisoner of the United States, Niezychowski was evidently quite a popular storyteller among influential Americans, partially because he was the nephew of Baron Ladislaus Hengelmüller von Hengervár, who had been Austro-Hungarian ambassador to the United States for decades, until retiring in 1913. Niezychowski was known as the "jolly Polish count" and after his release from Fort McPherson, Georgia in August 1919, he moved to Washington DC, where he was welcomed into diplomatic and society circles. He was also president of the Polish American Navigation Company of New York.

In October 1923, Niezychowski became engaged to marry Nanine H. Ulman (1896–1972), a Baltimore socialite and Colonial Dame, daughter of Jacob A. Ulman of Helmore Farms in Green Spring Valley, and great-grandniece of President Thomas Jefferson.

Having renounced his European titles, Niezychowski became an American citizen in January 1926; the affianced couple married on December 27, 1927, with Admiral Walter McLean, commander of the Norfolk Navy Yard (where the groom's ship had been interned ten years earlier) was his best man.

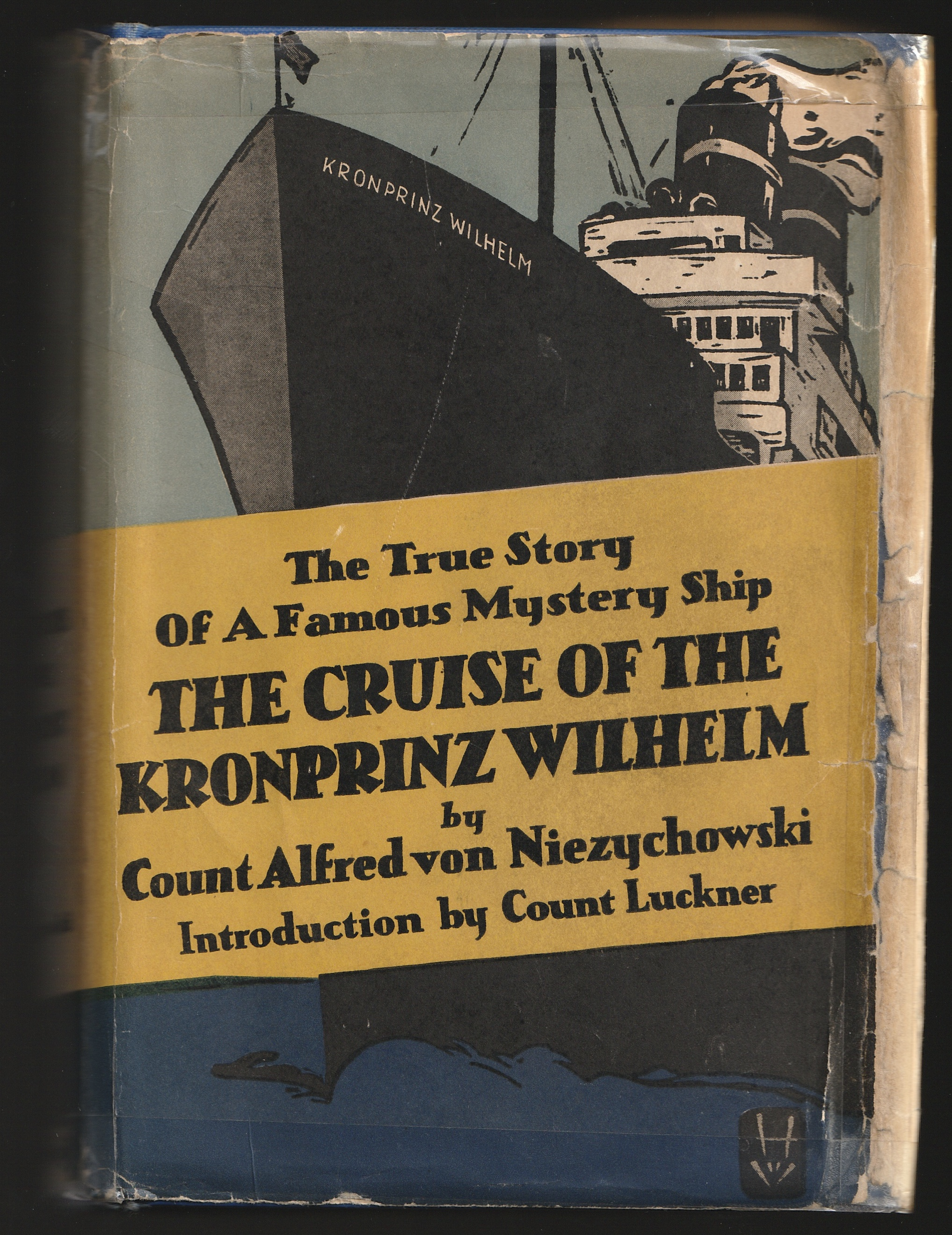
2nd edition cover of The Cruise of the Kronprinz Wilhelm

After their wedding, Niezychowski and his wife moved to Detroit, Michigan, where he entered the business world; He first worked as a salesman with a printing and advertising company, and later with the Seldon & Johnson real estate firm. In 1928, he published a book about the Kronprinz Wilhelm's 251-day adventure, and gave lectures on the subject. He was known for signing autographs with green ink, and one of his lecture taglines was that of all of the ships that had been sunk during the ship's wartime duty, it had never caused the loss of a single human life. The capturing and sinking had been done in a very civilized, even courteous, manner. Passengers who had been taken aboard from a captured vessel were often given first class accommodations aboard the ex-passenger-liner/commerce-raider (members of the crew until they could be transferred to another ship).

In 1932, while in the investment brokerage business, Niezychowski ran as a Democratic candidate for the Michigan First District. He was a staunch Democrat, and wanted to fight for the immediate repeal of the Eighteenth Amendment, as well as lowering tariff laws to restore foreign trade. However, he lost in the primary election to George G. Sadowski.

Niezychowski and Nanine had no biological children, though Niezychowski did become guardian for the children of his half-brother Count Antoni Dunin, after both Antoni and his wife, Zofia Werner Dunin (daughter of Polish vice-Finance Minister Edward Werner), had been killed in 1939, during the German offensive in the Invasion of Poland. According to the Detroit News, Alfred worked with Senator Homer Ferguson of Michigan, to obtain visas so that the orphaned children could enter the United States in the 1940s. They were:

- Count Stanley Dunin, who later participated in a NASA project, launching the world's first geosynchronous communications satellite
- Countess Magda Dunin Hirata, who later married Japanese-American scientist Arthur Hirata
- Countess Christine Dunin Zika, later the mother of noted botanist Peter Zika

In 1964, Niezychowski died in Michigan, and was buried in Mount Elliott Cemetery in Grosse Pointe.

== Works ==
- Count Alfred von Niezychowski, The Cruise of the Kronprinz Wilhelm, 1928, Doubleday & Company, with introductions by Admiral Walter McLean (commandant of the Virginia Norfolk Navy Yard where the Kronprinz Wilhelm was interned), and Count Felix von Luckner.

== Notable relatives ==
- Rodryg Dunin, Alfred's stepfather, was a hrabia (Count) and listed in the Polish Biographical Dictionary, a Who's Who of Poland.
- Baron Ladislaus Hengelmüller von Hengervár, longtime Austro-Hungarian ambassador to the United States, was Alfred's uncle by one of his father's sisters.
- Alfons Taczanowski, hereditary member of the Prussian House of Lords, was Alfred's great-uncle on his mother's side.
- Edward Werner, Polish vice-Finance Minister, was the father-in-law of Alfred's brother, Antoni Dunin.
- Antoni Dunin, Alfred's younger half-brother, was a Polish army officer killed in 1939, and recipient of the Virtuti Militari award (similar to the American Medal of Honor).
