= Dunin =

Labedz Coat of Arms

The Polish surname Dunin originated in the 12th century with Piotr Włost Dunin, who was the Palatine of Poland and the castellan of Wroclaw (Silesia). He was also the Brother in law of Duke Bolesław III Wrymouth (Boleslaw Krzywousty). The coat of arms associated with the surename is the Łabędź (swan). See: Duninowie family.

- Piotr Włostowic, also known as 'Piotr Włost Dunin', a Silesian noble and voivode, adviser of the king of Poland (1080–1153)
- Princess Mariya (Maria), daughter of Grand Duke Sviatopolk II of Kiev and Olena, daughter of Kuman/Kipchak chief Tugorkhan, she married Piotr Włostowic and co-founded the Dunin family.
- Piotr Dunin (fl. 1462), Polish military hero
- Marcin Dunin (1774–1842), Archbishop of Poznań and Gniezno (1831–1842)
- Count Stanisław Dunin-Wąsowicz, Polish general, captain of the 1st Polish Lancers and Napoleon's loyal aide-de-camp during his 1812 Russian Campaign.
- Vintsent Dunin-Martsinkyevich (1808–1884), Polish-Belarusian writer, poet, dramatist and social activist
- Count Rodryg Dunin (1870–1928), Polish agriculturist
- Count Casimir Dunin-Markiewicz (1874–1932) (also spelled Kazimierz Dunin-Markiewicz), Polish painter
- Count Antoni Dunin (1907–1939), Polish army officer
- Ron Dunin (1918–2004), mayor of San Luis Obispo, California from 1985 to 1992
- Elsie Ivancich Dunin (born 1935), Croatian-American dance ethnologist
- Frank Dunin (1935–2025), Australian rules footballer
- Kinga Dunin (born 1954), Polish writer, feminist, and sociologist
- Elonka Dunin (born 1958), American cryptographer and game developer
- Rafal E. Dunin-Borkowski (born 1969), British experimental physicist

== See also ==
- Dunn (surname)
- Dunning (surname)
