= Dunin family =

Łabędź coat of arms of the Duninowie family

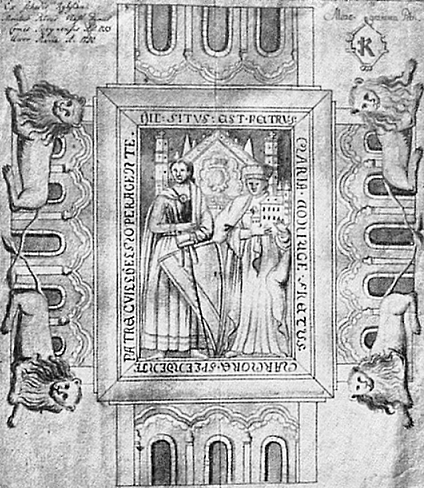
Grave sculpture of Piotr Wlostowic

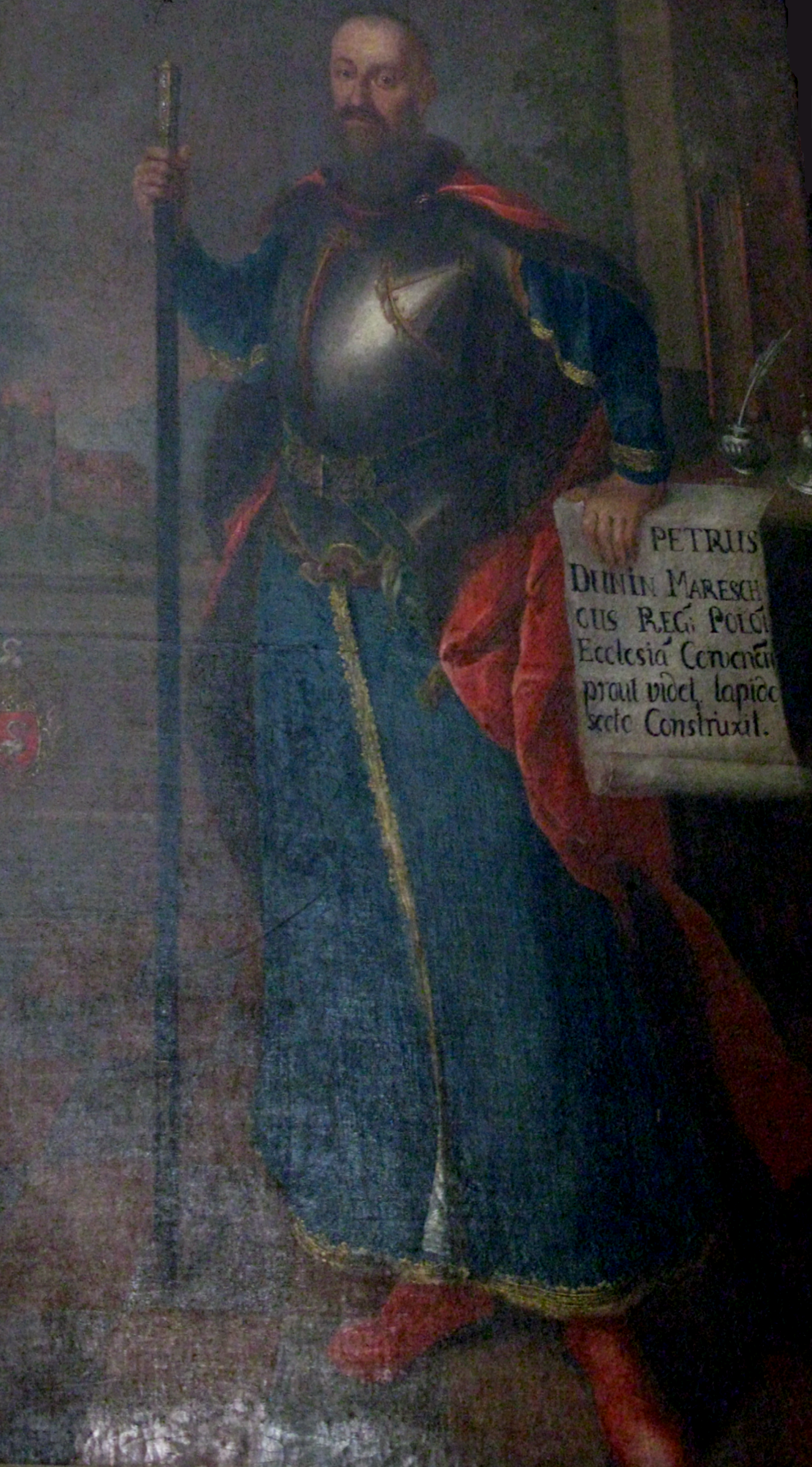
Piotr Dunin z Prawkowic

The Dunin family, Polish: Duninowie, also Łabędź family, Łabędzie (after their coat of arms) was an old Polish noble family, whose members were Magnates in medieval Poland. Members of the family held the title of Count in Poland.

== History ==
The progenitor of the family was Piotr Włostowic, a voivode and adviser of Duke Bolesław III Wrymouth.

== Notable members ==
- Piotr Włostowic, progenitor, castellan of Wrocław, and a ruler (możnowładca) of a part of Silesia
- Sulisław of Kraków (died 1241), commanding an army at the Battle of Legnica
- Piotr (?–1198), Archbishop of Gniezno - probably the fundator of the Gniezno Doors
- Piotr Dunin z Prawkowic (c. 1415 – 1484), led the Polish army to victory over the Teutonic Knights in the Battle of Świecino at Malbork castle
- Stanisław Dunin-Karwicki (1640–1724), politician and political writer
- Marcin Dunin-Sulgostowski (1774–1842), Primate of Poland 1831–1842
- Stanisław Dunin-Wąsowicz (1785–1864), general of the November Uprising
- Wincenty Dunin-Marcinkiewicz (1808–1884), poet, dramatist
- Alfons Dunin-Borkowski (1850–1907), painter, follower of Jan Matejko
- Casimir Dunin-Markiewicz (1867–1932), painter, playwright and theatre director
- Rodryg Dunin (1870–1928), industrialist and agriculturalist
- Antoni Dunin (1907–1939), officer of the Polish Army
- Isabel Sabogal Dunin-Borkowski (born 1958), Peruvian translator, editor and astrologer
- Leon Dunin-Wąsowicz (born 2007), Professional basketball player for WKS Śląsk Wrocław

== See also ==
- Łabędź coat of arms
- Carmen Mauri

== Residences ==
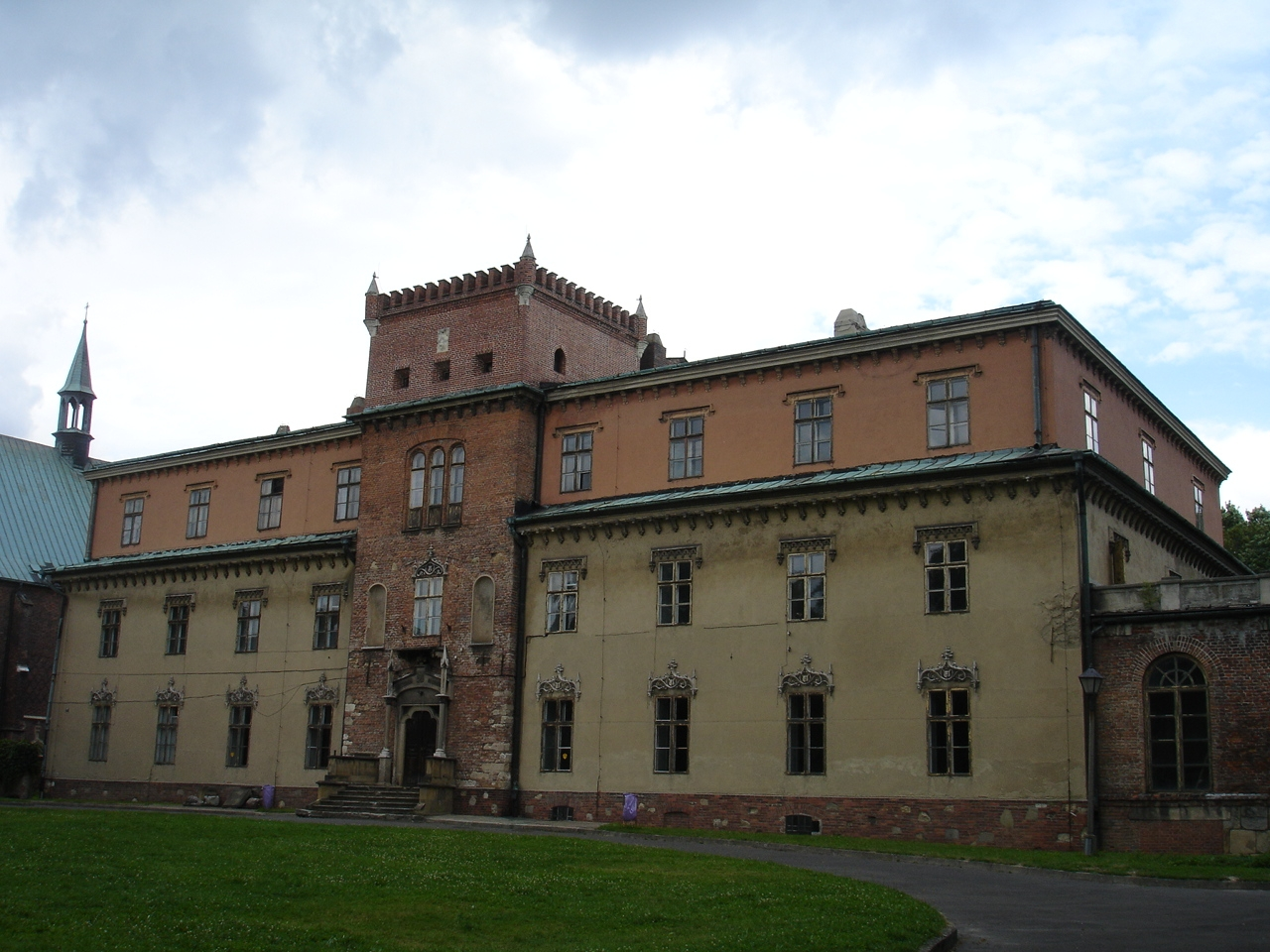
Potocki Castle in Zator

== Bibliography ==
- Kazimierz Śmigiel: Słownik biograficzny arcybiskupów gnieźnieńskich i prymasów Polski, Wydawn. WBP, 2002
- Wojciech Kriegseisen, Ewangelicy polscy i litewscy w epoce saskiej (1696–1763), Warszawa 1996
- "Polski Słownik Biograficzny", t. II, str. 237 i nn.
