= Walter McLean (United States Navy officer) =

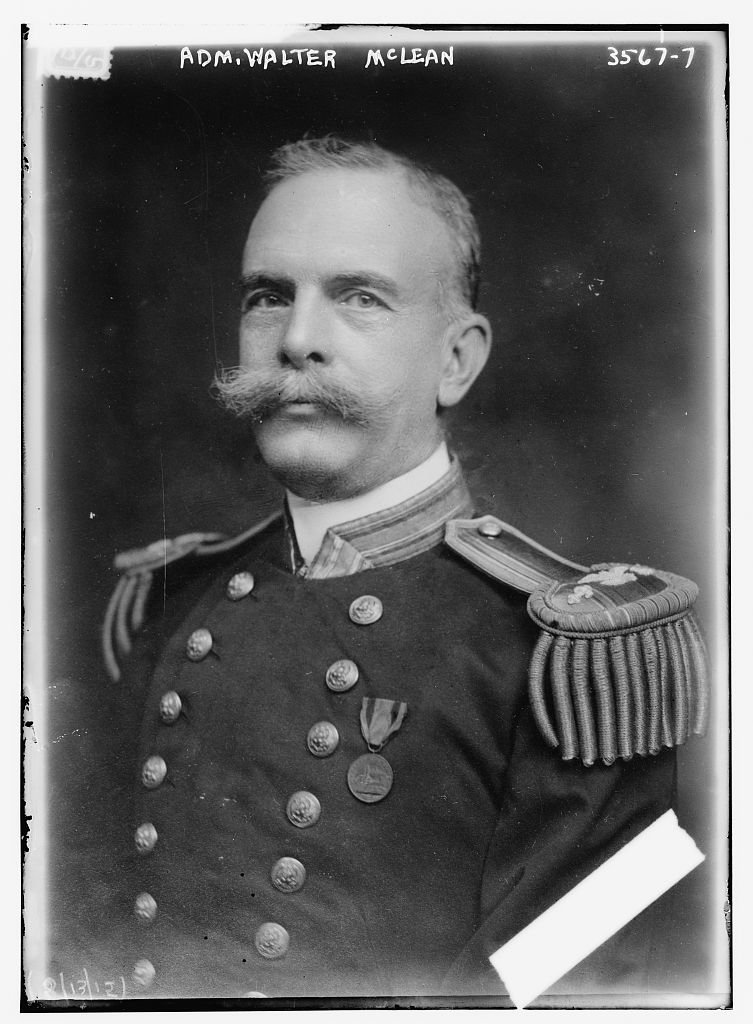
- Born: July 30, 1855
- Died: March 21, 1930 (aged 74); Annapolis, Maryland
- Military career
- Allegiance: United States
- Branch: United States Navy
- Rank: Rear Admiral
- Conflicts: Spanish–American War; World War I

Rear Admiral Walter L. McLean (1855 – March 21, 1930) was the American commander of the Norfolk Naval Shipyard from November 25, 1915, until February 4, 1918. Under his command, the Shipyard was the holding area for various German vessels which had put into port during World War I, and stayed in a somewhat limbo status—the United States had not entered the war and so could not commandeer the ships, but then neither could the ships be allowed to depart and resume attacks on Allied shipping. The course of action was therefore to keep the foreign ships and their crews as "guests" of the United States for years.

== Biography ==
He was born on July 30, 1855, in New York or New Jersey.

During World War I, McLean was commander of the Fifth Naval District, and also commandant of the Navy Base at Hampton Roads. According to the New York Times, he was with Admiral George Dewey at the Battle of Manila Bay in 1898, during the Spanish–American War.

He was named commander of the Norfolk Naval Shipyard from November 25, 1915.

In 1915 he detained SS Kronprinz Wilhelm, a German passenger liner which had had guns installed and been turned into a commerce raider for the Imperial German Navy. When the United States entered the war in 1917, the ship was renamed as USS Von Steuben and turned into a troop transport.

He resigned as commander of the Norfolk Naval Shipyard on February 4, 1918.

McLean maintained friendly relations with some of the detained crew. When the second-in-command of Kronprinz Wilhelm, Alfred Niezychowski, got married in 1927, McLean was best man. McLean also encouraged Niezychowski to write a book about the journey, and McLean wrote his own forward to it when it was published in 1928 as The Cruise of the Kronprinz Wilhelm.

He died on March 21, 1930, of a stroke at the Navy Hospital in Annapolis, at the age of 75.
