= Skrzynno, Masovian Voivodeship =

Skrzynno
- Village
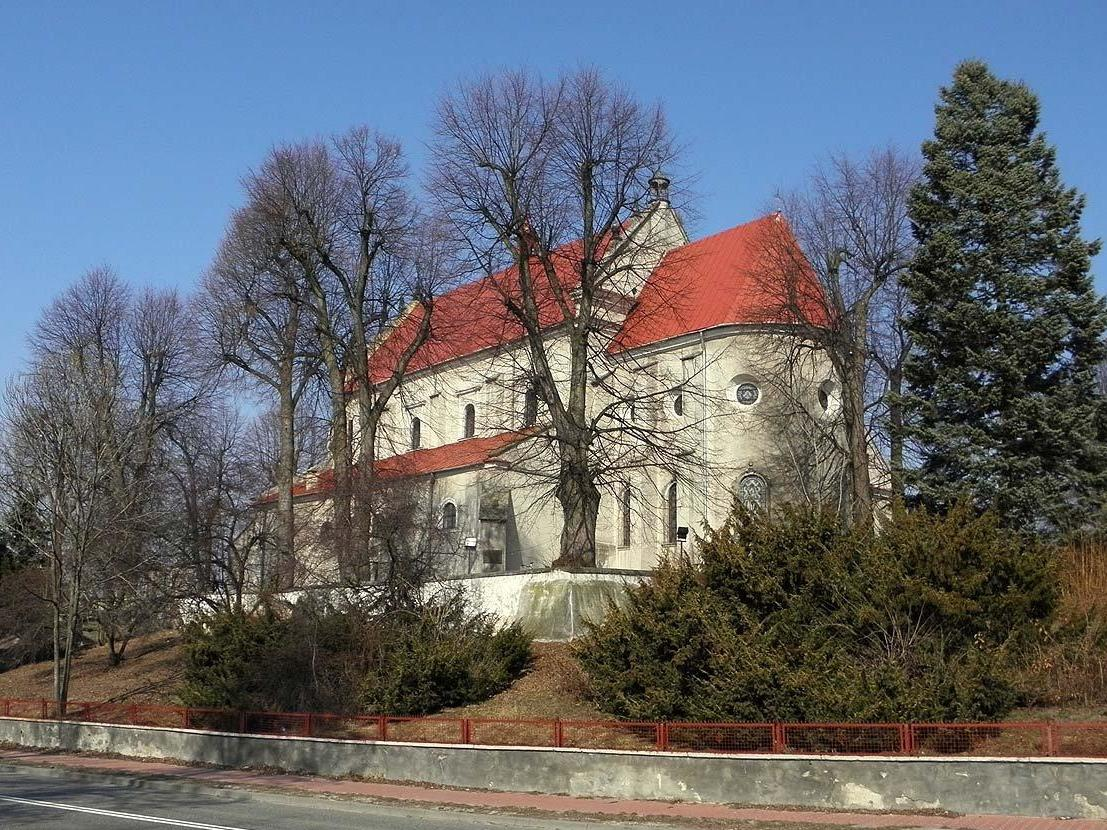
- Saint Stephen church in Skrzynno
- Interactive map of Skrzynno
- Location within Poland
- Coordinates: 51°21′49″N 20°43′10″E
- Country: Poland
- Voivodeship: Masovian
- County: Przysucha
- Gmina: Wieniawa

Population
  - Total: 300
- Time zone: UTC+1 (CET)
  - Summer (DST): UTC+2 (CEST)
- Vehicle registration: WPY

Skrzynno [ˈskʂɨnnɔ] is a village in the administrative district of Gmina Wieniawa, within Przysucha County, Masovian Voivodeship, in east-central Poland.

== History ==
The village has a long and rich history. In the early days of the Kingdom of Poland, Skrzynno was an important center of northwestern Lesser Poland. First mention of Skrzynno comes from the year 1136. In a Bull of Pope Innocent II, a settlement called Scrin is presented. By 1234, Skrzynno already was a local administrative center (districtus Scrin), and first mention of its parish church comes from 1280. In that year, Prince Przemysł II made a transaction with Bishop of Poznań, giving him villages in Greater Poland, in exchange for Skrzynno, together with the church (villa forensem sitam in terra Sandomiriensi cum ecclesia). A few years later, Przemysl II sold Skrzynno to Pomeranian Prince Mestwin II. In the early 14th century, Skrzynno was handed over to Wladyslaw Lokietek.

The town was divided into two separate municipalities - Skrzynsko (Antiqua Skrzin) and Skrzynno (Skrzin). Furthermore, there was a settlement called Nova Skrzin. It is not known when Skrzynno received its town charter (Sroda Slaska rights), it probably took place before the year 1308. During the reign of King Casimir III the Great, Skrzynno was a royal town. In the second half of the 14th century, it became property of Cistercian Abbey from Sulejów (see Sulejów Abbey). It has not been established who was the founder of the Skrzynno parish church. It could have been Piotr Włostowic, who lived in the late 11th and early 12th century. Current church was built in 1626–38. After the destruction in the Great Northern War, the church was remodelled several times. In 1642, first Scottish settlers were noted.

Grand Master of the Teutonic Knights Ulrich von Jungingen was killed by the knight Mszczuj from Skrzynno in the Battle of Grunwald in 1410.
