= Antoni Dunin =

Polish nobleman (1907–1939)

Antoni Dunin (1907–1939) was a Polish nobleman (szlachta), a Hrabia (Count), and an army officer who received the Virtuti Militari award.

== Biography ==
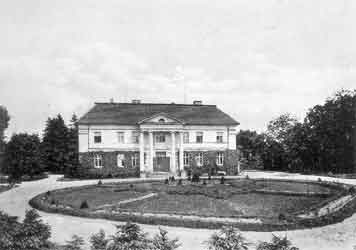
The Granówko estate, Dunin's childhood home

Dunin was born on 5 June 1907, the youngest child of Lucia (Łucja) Taczanowska (1862–1917) and her second husband Count Rodryg Dunin (1870–1928). He grew up at the Granówko estate near Poznań, the youngest of ten children. He had six older siblings by his mother's first marriage to Stanisław Niezychowski, and two full sisters and one full brother, children of his own father Rodryg. The Dunin family crest is the Łabędź (swan).

On 28 December 1933 Dunin married Zofia Helena Werner (1910–1939), daughter of Poland's vice-Finance Minister Edward Werner, and great-niece of Saint Raphael Kalinowski. They had three children: Krystyna, Stanley (Stanisław, named after Dunin's older brother), and Magda (Magdelena).

Between 1933 and 1934 he served as an NCO in the Polish Army and graduated from the Cavalry Training Centre, where he was also awarded with the memorial badge of his home unit, the 15th Poznań Uhlan's Regiment. Mobilized prior to the outbreak of World War II, Dunin was drafted into the Wielkopolska Cavalry Brigade under Gen. Roman Abraham. Serving in the rank of Porucznik (First Lieutenant) he commanded the march squadron of the 15th Poznań Uhlan's Regiment. He joined the regiment with his unit on 8 September 1939, and took part in the Battle of Bzura. Dunin was killed in combat at the age of 32 on 16 September 1939. His wife was killed the next day, at the age of 29.

Dunin's descendants were eventually able to escape Poland to France and finally to the United States in the 1940s.

== In popular culture ==
Dunin is one of the characters in the Italian novel "Il Guardiano dei Sogni" (The Guardian of Dreams) by Paolo Maurensig (ISBN 88-04-54976-9).

== See also ==
- Dunin (surname), other figures who share the family name
