= Granówko =

- Village
- Location within Poland
- Coordinates: 52°12′N 16°33′E
- Country: Poland
- Voivodeship: Greater Poland
- County: Grodzisk
- Gmina: Granowo

Granówko [ɡraˈnufkɔ] is a village in the administrative district of Gmina Granowo, within Grodzisk County, Greater Poland Voivodeship, in west-central Poland.

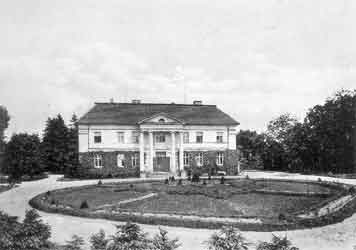
Granówko mansion

An old mansion is located there, currently being renovated. The mansion was built in the early 19th century by Nepomucen Nieżychowski (1774–1781) the estate's owner at the time, and it served as the seat of the Nieżychowski family. In 1898 it came into the hands of Count Rodryg Dunin (1870–1928) through his marriage to Lucia Taczanowska (1862–1917), the widow of Stanislaw Niezychowski (1851–1897).

In 1928 the estate was returned to Taczanowska's eldest son by her first marriage, Jozef Niezychowski (1885–1960), and Dunin purchased a separate estate, Ruchocice.
