= Stanisław Dunin-Wąsowicz =

Polish noble

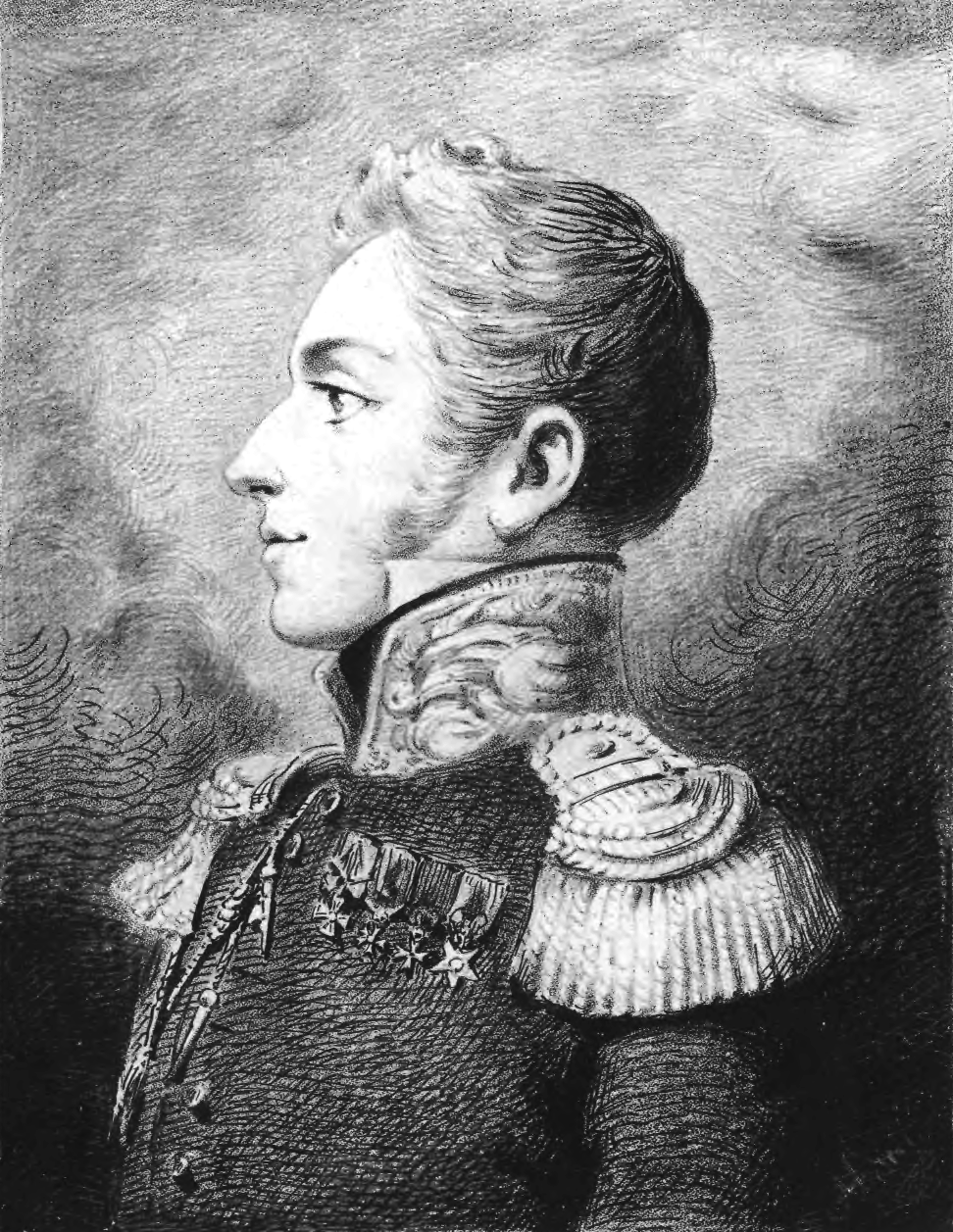

Count Stanisław Dunin-Wąsowicz (1785 in Owrucz, Polish-Lithuanian Commonwealth – 1864 in Paris, France) was a Polish general of the November Uprising, Captain of the 1st Polish Lancers, Napoleon's bodyguard and aide-de-camp during his 1812 Russian Campaign.

== Early life ==
Born into an old Dunin family, as the son of Count Adam Dunin-Wąsowicz, Łabędź coat of arms and his wife, Anna Maria Niemirycz, Klamry coat of arms.

== Career ==
On December 5, 1812, with Napoleon's troops in disarray and freezing temperatures taking a heavy toll, Napoleon abandoned his Grand Army at Smarhon (then in the Russian Empire, now in Belarus) and retreated to Paris. Napoleon was accompanied only by a Mameluke bodyguard and Captain (Count) Dunin-Wąsowicz. Napoleon ordered that he should never be allowed to be captured alive and handed Count Dunin-Wąsowicz a set of pistols.

== Bibliography ==
- H. P Kosk Generalicja polska t. 2 wyd. Oficyna Wydawnicza "Ajaks" Pruszków 2001.
