= Wladislaw Taczanowski =

German politician (1825–1893)

Wladislaw (von) Taczanowski (12 August 1825 – 13 March 1893) was an elected member of the German Reichstag in Berlin from March 1871 to January 1877 as a representative of the Polenpartei ("Polish Party"). A nobleman and member of the Taczanowski magnate dynasty, he is regarded as one of the influential Prussian-Polish politicians active during the early phase of the German Empire.

Taczanowski was born in Szypłów near Śrem in the Grand Duchy of Posen.
