= Mszczuj of Skrzynno =

Polish knight

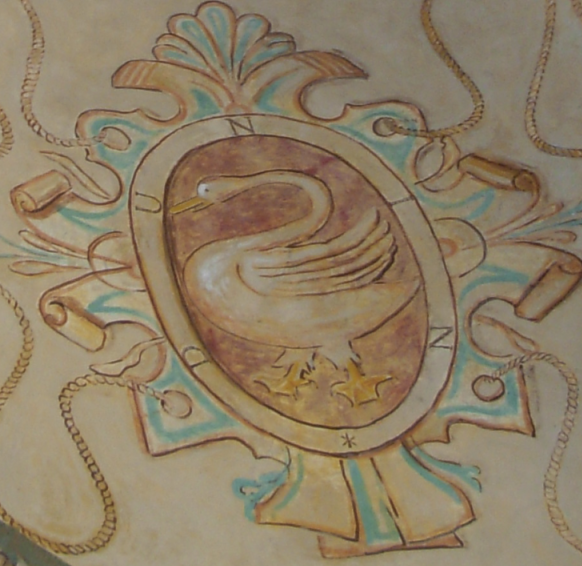
Łabędź coat of arms (Dunin) in Baranow-Sandomierski Castle

Mszczuj of Skrzynno (Polish pronunciation: [mʂt͡ʂui̯]; also Mściwoj [ˈmɕt͡ɕivɔi̯] of Skrzynno; Polish: Mszczuj ze Skrzynna; died in 1446) was a Polish knight who served under Władysław Jagiełło and participated in the Battle of Grunwald on 15 July 1410 against the Teutonic Knights. He was a knight in the royal household regiment of the King of Poland (cubiculariorum) and bore the Łabędź (Swan) coat of arms.

According to the Polish chronicler Jan Długosz, Mszczuj was part of the third Rota, a unit of cavalry of the royal household under the leadership of Andrzej Ciołek of Żelechowo and Jan Odrowąż of Sprowa. Długosz reports that Mszczuj was the knight who defeated and killed the Grand Master of the Order, Ulrich von Jungingen, during the Battle of Grunwald. Długosz offers two pieces of evidence for this. First, Mszczuj's squire, Jurga, acquired and handed over a valuable reliquary with holy relics that had previously belonged to von Jungingen, as well as the Grand Master's battle cloak. Second, the location of the Grand Master's body was made possible thanks to directions given by Mszczuj, indicating that the two knights had definitely engaged each other on the battlefield.

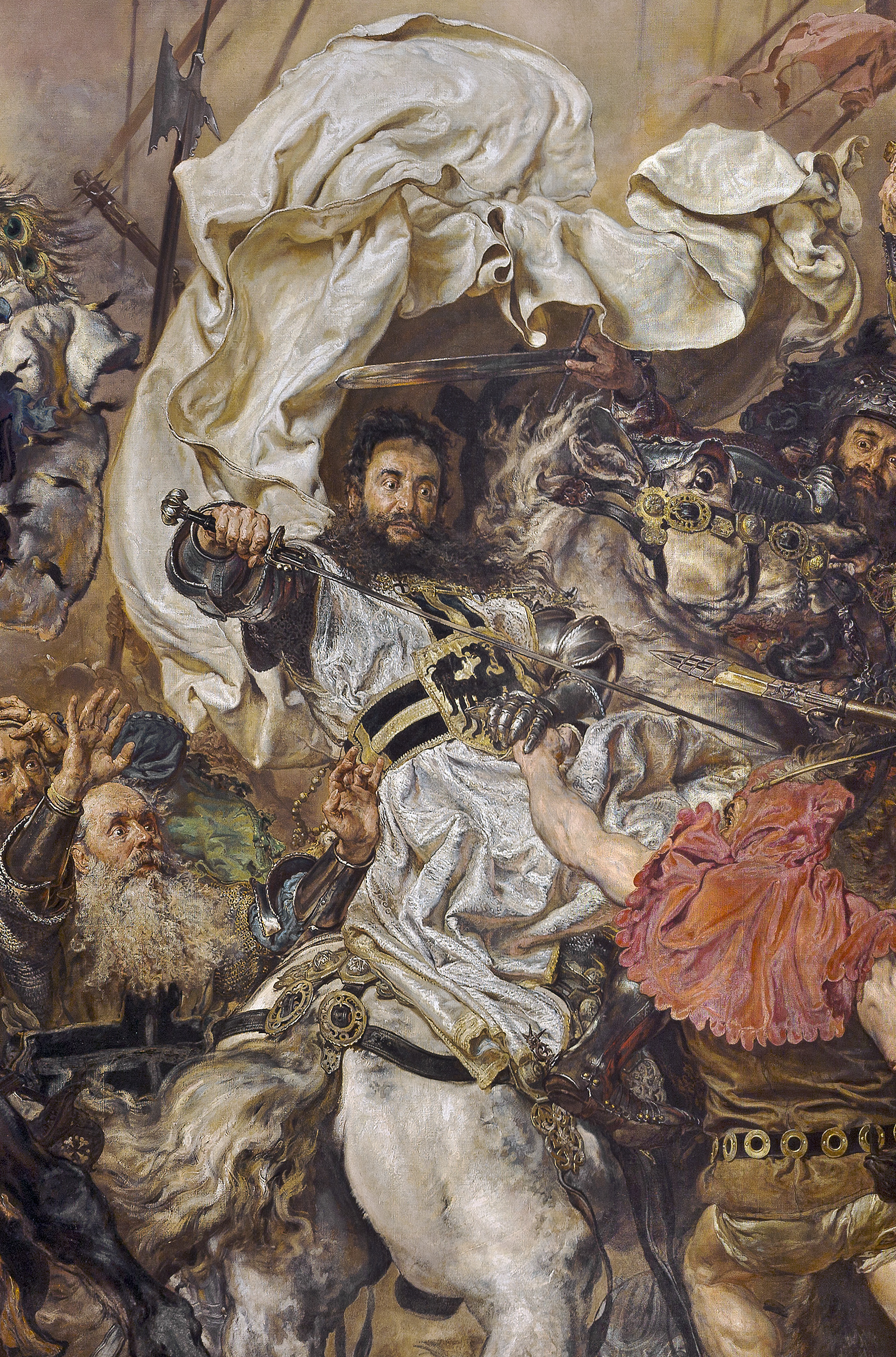
Death of Ulrich von Jungingen, a detail of a painting by Jan Matejko

On 10 September 1410, Mszczuj took part in a follow-up battle against the Teutonic Knights at Koronowo, contributing to the Polish-Lithuanian victory.

In 1412, he was part of the delegation and personal escort of Władysław Jagiełło to the Kingdom of Hungary, where he participated in tournaments and jousts. In 1428, he took part in the expedition against Great Novgorod led by the Grand Duke of Lithuania Vytautas. In 1431, he participated in Władysław Jagiełło's campaign against the rebel Švitrigaila in Lithuania and was present at the siege of Lutsk. A year later, he led reinforcements for the new Grand Duke, Zygmunt Kiejstutowicz, in his war against Švitrigaila.

Mszczuj owned large tracts of land in Volodymyr. A 15th-century church, purportedly built by Mszczuj, can be found and visited in Opoczno.
