= Ron Dunin =

American politician

Ron Dunin (1918 – April 18, 2004) was an American politician. In 1977, he was elected to the San Luis Obispo City Council. In 1985, he was elected as a three-term mayor of San Luis Obispo, California, retiring in 1992.

He was born in Poland. From 1938 to 1945, he was a member of the Polish forces, serving in Poland, France, and the United Kingdom, receiving decorations from all three countries. In 1965, he moved from the United Kingdom to San Luis Obispo County, and became a member and chairperson of many city and civic boards and committees.

== See also ==
- Dunin (surname)
- San Luis Obispo
