= Dassanowsky =

Former Austrian noble family

The Dassanowsky family (also Dassanofsky, Dassanovsky, etc.) is the name of the Austrian branch of the Polish noble magnate family Taczanowski which came to Vienna in 1683 and has produced notable figures in Austrian civic and cultural life. Dassanowskyweg (Dassanowsky Way) in the 22nd District (Donaustadt) of Vienna was named in recognition of the family.

== Notable members ==
Notable members include:

- Andrzej (Andreas) Taczanowski, Knight Commander under King Jan Sobieski in Vienna during the Turkish Siege (Battle of Vienna) of 1683
- Leopold Johannes Dassanowsky, Director of the Imperial Court Postal Service; expanded postal routes across the empire in the 18th century
- Elfi von Dassanowsky (1924–2007), Austrian-born opera singer, pianist, film producer
- Robert von Dassanowsky (1965–2023), Austrian-American educator, cultural historian, film producer

== See also ==
- Taczanowski

== Selected literature ==
- Stefan Graf von Szydlow-Szydlowski und Nikolaus R. von Pastinszky, Der polnische und litauische Hochadel, Budapest 1944
- Günther Berger, “Die Familie v. Dassanowsky: Die kaisertreue österreichische Linie des polnischen Grafenhauses Taczanowski zu Taczanow,” Krone und Reich: Zeitschrift des Verbandes der Österreicher zur Wahrung der Geschichte Österreichs, 1/2 1999, 13–15.
- Felix Czeike, Historisches Lexikon der Stadt Wien, Vol. 5, Vienna: K&S, 1997.
- Austria Forum at www.austriaforum.org.
