= Edward Werner =

Polish economist, judge, industrialist and politician

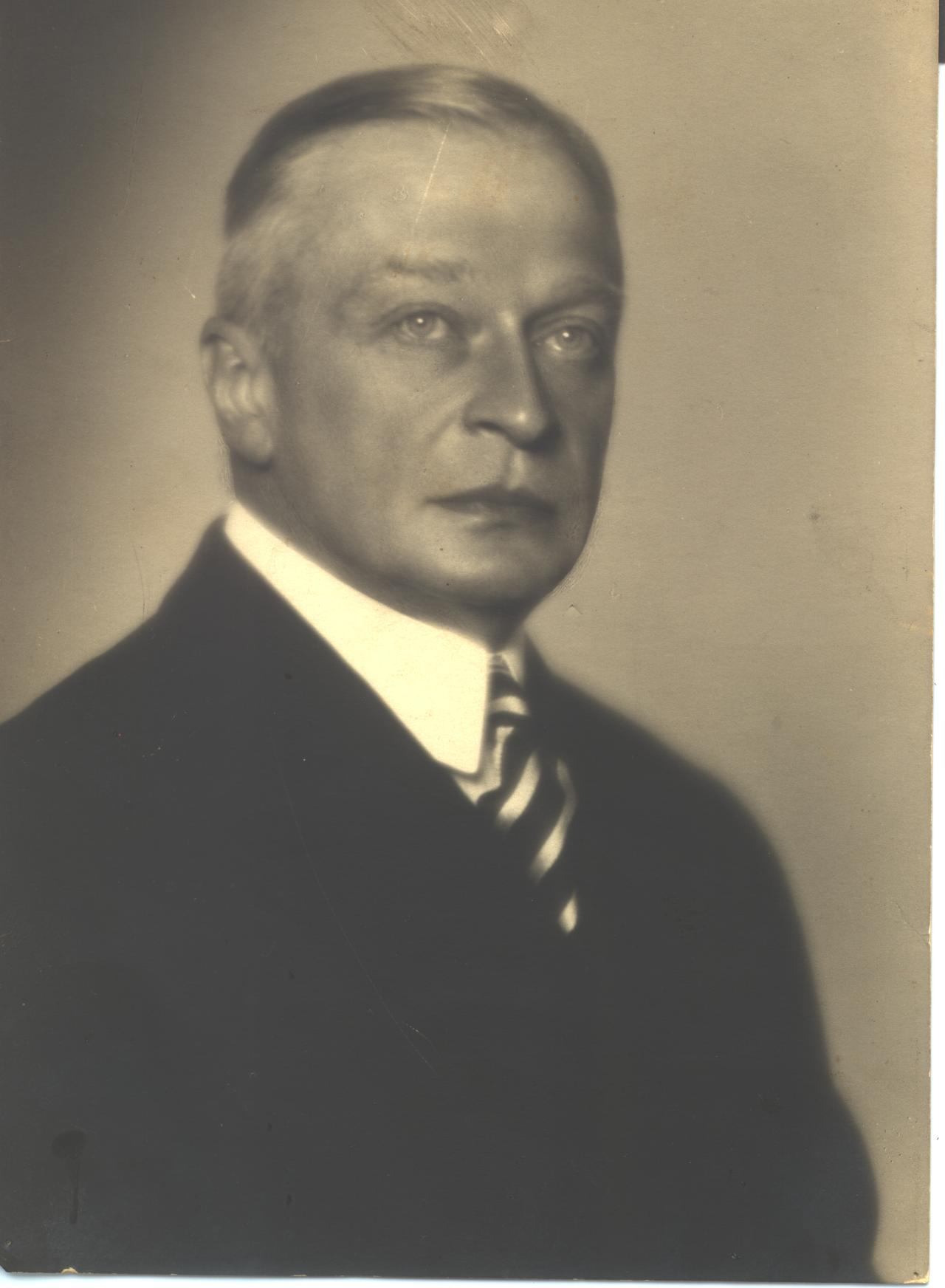
Edward Werner, c. 1930

Edward Henryk Werner (23 May 1878 – 13 November 1945) was a Polish economist, judge, industrialist, and politician. He was best known as Vice-Minister of Finance in the Second Polish Republic.

== Life ==
Edward Werner was born in 1878 in Warsaw, to Bronisław-Fryderyk Werner and Maria-Paulina (Strasburger), sister of the famous botanist Eduard Strasburger. He studied first at the Lyceum in Poland and then at the Academy of Commerce in Vienna. He later studied economics in London and in Berlin. Werner married Zofia Helena Kalinowska (1889–1946), niece of Raphael Kalinowski who later became Saint. Edward and Zofia had three children: Zofia Helena (1910–1939), who married Hrabia (Count) Antoni Dunin and had three children, but was killed along with her husband during the German offensive of September 1939; Karol Gabriel (1912–1978), a lieutenant who escaped Poland to England, and fought with the regrouped Polish 1st Armoured Division in the World War II battle of Falaise Gap and later married Louise Garbison-Lambert; and, Marie Gabriela (1916–1999), first married to Joseph Ciechomski of Warsaw, then arrested and sent to Auschwitz, but survived and emigrated to the United States with her nephew and nieces, and later married Józef Nabel and had three children of her own, one of whom, Marie Nabel Cohen married Jared Diamond.

== Professional career ==
As an economist, Werner was judge of the Court of Commerce, Instructor of Public Servants, and Lecturer in Taxation and Finance. As a businessman, he engaged in trade in grain and fertilizers. As an industrialist, his interests were in the manufacture of tobacco and the production of sugar, and he was opposed to the introduction of the state tobacco monopoly in Poland in 1924. He became a Councilman of Warsaw, and in 1934 he was vice-Minister of Finance, with all the State monopolies under his authority.

Werner was an active Lutheran and supported charities such as the Y.M.C.A. During World War I he set up a private hospital for the wounded under the auspices of the Polish Red Cross and superintended the work in the hospital. At the beginning of World War II, Werner witnessed the bombardment of Warsaw by the Germans.

In 1940 he travelled to the United States, where he applied for citizenship in 1941. He lectured widely in the United States and Canada on religious matters and on Poland, and was also involved with the Polish government-in-exile.

He died of a heart attack in 1945, in New York City, and is buried at Woodlawn Cemetery in the Bronx.

== See also ==
- List of Finance Ministers of Poland
