= Piotr Włostowic =

Polish noble (c. 1080 – 1153)

Herb Łabędź

Piotr Włostowic (or Włost; c. 1080 – 1153), also known as Peter Wlast, was a Polish noble, castellan of Wrocław, and a ruler (możnowładca) of part of Silesia. From 1117 he was voivode (palatyn) of the Duke of Poland Bolesław III Wrymouth. Part of the Łabędzie family, and son of Włost, he is likely to have been related to older princes of Silesia. His lands included the territories near Mount Ślęża and Piasek Island near Wrocław. The Dunin clan of noble families claims descent from him.

His most famous deed is the capture of Volodar (Wołodar) of Peremyshl (Przemyśl). Later he married Maria, a daughter of Sviatopolk II of Kiev. For this marriage and his adventure in Rus', he was ordered by the Church to reconcile. He was ordered to construct seventy churches.

Włostowic, a loyal subject of Bolesław III, had much more negative relations with Bolesław's son, Władysław II the Exile, and especially his wife, Agnes of Babenberg, who considered Włostowic a traitor. In 1146, Włostowic was captured by Władysław, blinded and muted. This mutilation of the popular Włostowic was one of the reasons for a civil war between Władysław and his brothers, as the blinded Włostowic went to Rus', which had so far supported Władysław, and convinced them to break their alliance. Eventually Władysław lost the war and went into exile in 1146. Włostowic regained his position and estates, but his disability and worsening health prevented him from taking further active part in politics, and he died in 1153.

== Biography ==
=== Youth ===
Relatively little is known about Włostowic's youth, other than he was a scion of a relatively wealthy and powerful Silesian family, and became a trusted retainer of the duke of Poland, Bolesław III Wrymouth.

Twentieth-century German medieval researchers saw Włostowic as a grandson of a Magnus, Count of Wrocław, who was described by the chronicler Gallus Anonymus as a royal who arrived in the 1070s from a land that had just fallen under the yoke of foreign rule. Some historians, most notably Tomasz Jurek, have postulated that Magnus, Count of Wrocław was in fact Magnus Haroldson, the son of the Anglo-Saxon king Harold II, who had fled England along with his siblings following the defeat of their father by William the Conqueror, thereby tracing Włostowic's ancestry to England.

=== The capture of prince Wołodar ===
When Bolesław was engaged in hostilities with Wołodar, prince of Przemyśl, Włostowic used subterfuge to gain Wołodar's trust, staging a pretended revolt against Bolesław, and joining Wołodar's court. Some time later, when he found himself alone with Wołodar during a hunt, he captured him and led Wołodar before Bolesław, who released him only after Wołodar paid a large ransom and a promised to ally himself with the Duke.

=== Marriage ===
When Zbysława of Kiev, daughter of Sviatopolk II of Kiev and wife of Bolesław died, Włostowic was sent by Bolesław to Sviatopolk to negotiate a marriage to another daughter. However, before the negotiations were completed, Bolesław married Salome von Berg-Schelklingen, and Włostowic himself married another daughter of Sviatopolk, Maria.

=== Reconciliation ===
After having tricked Wołodar and married to Maria, Włostowic was ordered to construct seven churches as reconciliation. But he built 70 churches and 30 convents, and that led to nicknaming a type of romanesque churches in Poland as 'Dunin's churches' (from Peter's nickname, Dunin).

=== Voivode ===
His marriage to Maria, the daughter of a powerful ruler, further elevated Włostowic, and he received the rank of voivode (Palatine or comes palatinus) from Bolesław. At that time voivode was one of the most important positions in the Kingdom of Poland: he commanded the military when the king was absent, presided in courts during the king's absence, was responsible for order and security of the court, and in cases where the king was not an adult, the voivode even became the regent.

=== Death of Bolesław ===
Several years later, Salome, wife of Bolesław, forced him to resign as voivode, replacing him with Wszebor — a man she considered more likely to support her and her sons from her second marriage, against the first-born son of Bolesław, Władysław II the Exile.

After the death of Bolesław in 1138, Władysław II became the new duke of Poland, and he reinstated Włostowic to the rank of voivode, as he did not want Wszebor, supporter of his brothers, to retain that rank. However Bolesław, who had had seven sons, in his last will had attempted to significantly reform the Polish monarchy in an attempt to prevent a civil war. Unfortunately, the attempt not only proved futile, but led into the period known as the fragmentation of Poland. Bolesław's will divided Poland into several princedoms, with one of his sons in charge of each one. The will declared that henceforth, the king of Poland was to be the oldest of the Piast dynasty, and not necessarily the heir of his firstborn. Władysław II opposed his father's wish, and encouraged by his wife, Agnes of Babenberg, tried to ensure his power as the king would not be weakened. As Boleslaw's chosen Voivode, a rift occurred when Włostowic argued against this. Włostowic feared a civil war, but by his opposition, he soon lost the trust of Bolesław, and especially that of his wife, who thought Wlast had sided with the younger sons of Bolesław.

A civil war began in 1142, with a string of Władysław victories. For his part, Włostowic refused to clearly declare himself for any side, instead choosing to try and smooth the conflicts and conduct negotiations.

In 1146, Władysław decided to finally remove Włostowic from the equation, ordering one of his knights, Dobek, to capture him. Dobek succeeded in this in a manner not unlike Włostowic's own capture of Wołodar: he arrived at Włostowic's court in Ołbino, and during the night captured Włostowic's court with his men. Agnes demanded Włostowic's death, but Władysław decided instead to make an example out of him: Wlast was blinded, muted and sentenced to exile.

This had not proven to be Władysław's wisest move. Włostowic was respected and had many friends, and his fate caused many people to switch their allegiance to the younger brothers. Further, the blinded Włostowic went to Rus', which had so far supported Władysław, and convinced them to break their alliance. As a result, Władyslaw was soon defeated. Włostowic regained his position as a voivode, but his disability and old age prevented him from becoming an active politician. He died on April 16, 1153.

== Legacy ==
In the coming centuries, Piotr Włostowic Dunin (or Peter Wlast) became a near-legendary figure, especially as contemporary writers-monks remembered his generous support of the Church. His story was told, among others, in the poem Carmen Mauri. Among the legends, one of the most prevalent is that Peter Wlast's family originates from Denmark, explaining his later nickname, 'Dunin', "the Dane". The Dunin clan has survived to the modern day and has many notable members. The family crest is the Labedz, the swan.
