= Łabędź coat of arms =

Polish coat of arms

Łabędź
- Alternative names: Cygnus, Junosza, Łabęć, Łabuć, Łambęć, Skrzymno, Skrzynno, Skrzyński
- Earliest mention: 1421
- Cities: Biłgoraj, Wysokie Mazowieckie, Zbąszynek, Zbąszyń, Żelechów
- Divisions: Kępno County, Gmina Przasnysz, Gmina Kępno, Gmina Borkowice
- Families: 346 names Audycki, Balbas, Bałaszko, Bałowski, Bartodziejski, Bauman, Berwaldski-Dunin, Berwaldzki, Berżański, Białowicz, Birzyński, Birżysko, Blinstrub, Błaszkowski, Bogdanowski, Borkowski, Borkowski-Dunin, Breański, Brezański, Brodowski, Brown, Brun, Bruński, Brzezicki, Brzeziński, Brzyszowski, Butrymowicz, Cielewicz, Ciemnicki, Czajewicz, Ćwikła, Damniowski, Damujewski, Damujowski, Daszczyński, Dejdygoltt, Deydolt, Dobulewicz, Dolgiert, Dołgiert, Donin, Donyn, Dowgajłło, Dowgajło, Dowgiert, Dowgird, Dunin, Dusznikiewicz, Duszyński, Galiński, Ganckow, Giełdowski, Gierdowski, Ginejd, Girski, Głuszewski, Głuszyński, Gojsiewski, Gojziewski, Gojżewski, Golginiewicz, Goligunt, Golimunt, Goławiński, Gościkowski, Goyżewski, Goździkowski, Górkiewicz, Górkowicz, Grodziński, Grodziski, Grudziński, Hatnicki, Hatowski, Haustowicz, Hołowczyński, Hordziejenko, Horodyjski, Horoszewicz, Hryszkiewicz, Ibiański, Iszliński, Jagiełło, Jagiełłowicz, Jagiełowicz, Jastrzębski, Jawgiełło, Jedko, Jundziłł, Juniewicz, Junowicz, Kacperski, Kamionomojski, Kaniemojski, Kaniomojski, Kantowicz, Karnikowski, Karnkowski, Karwacki, Karwicki, Karwicki Dunin, Kasperski, Kąsinowski, Kęplicz, Kęstowicz, Kęstowski, Kęśmin, Kierżgajłło, Kiezgajło, Kieżgajło, Kieżgało, Kłopocki, Kołaczek, Kołaczko, Komorowski, Koncewicz, Konczewicz, Konderewicz, Koniński, Kopaczewicz, Korbaczewski, Korejwicz, Kormułt, Koroszewicz, Kostrzejowski, Kozic, Kozica, Kozicki, Kozicz, Kozielecki, Krajewski, Krzczonowski, Krzonowski, Kudrewicz, Kulwieć, Kuncewicz, Kunderewicz, Kunicki, Kuńczewicz, Kupin, Kusprzak,Łabędźyński, Lebiedź,Łabędźyński, Leszczyłowski, Lichawski, Lipczyński, Lubdziński, Lubsieński, Lubsiński, Lubszyński, Lupsiński, Lutyk, Łabenta, Łabęcki, Łabędzki, Łabędź, Łabęta, Łabicki, Łabowski, Łabuć, Łabudź, Łaskarzewski, Łąkiński, Łęgonicki, Łowicki, Łuński, Macanowicz, Macenowicz, Maciejewicz, Maciejowicz, Macinowicz, Majewski, Maksymenko, Maksymowski, Mancewicz, Marcinkiewicz, Michalik, Marcinowicz, Marcińczyk, Marczenko, Markiewicz, Marusewicz, Marusiewicz, Maruszewicz, Matusewicz, Matusiewicz, Matuszewic, Matuszewicz, Matysewicz, Matysiewicz, Matyszewicz, Miczyński, Mieciński, Mieczeński, Mieczyński, Mieczyński Dunin, Miesojed, Miesopad, Mieszczański, Mikitynicz, Milimont, Milmont, Miłoszewicz, Mingaiłowicz, Mingajło, Miniat, Minigajło, Minmont, Mioduszewski, Misopad, Modliszewski, Monsztolt, Mozejko, Możejko, Możeyko, Narkiewicz, Neapolski, Niedroszlański, Niedrusławski, Niedruszlański, Niemieksza, Niemieszka, Nowacki, Ortyński, Otoski, Otowski, Owadowski, Pałacki, Pantkowski, Petko, Petruszewicz, Pilecki, Pladziewicz, Podhajski, Polib, Polip, Pomieski, Potopowicz, Primus, Progulbicki, Prokulbicki, Prymus, Przychoski, Przychowski, Przystałowski, Przyszowski, Ptaszycki, Pujkiewicz, Pujkowicz, Puykiewicz, Radoński, Radostowski, Rafałowski, Rajecki, Rajecki DuninDuninowie Grand Duke family, Rakint, Ratyński, Referowski, Roicki, Rostecki, Rostek, Rostocki, Ruksza, Rusinowski, Ruskowski, Ruszkowski, Rychlig, Rychlik, Rzuchowski, Rzuchowski ze Skrzynna Dunin, Salamon, Salomon, Sartoryusz, Sebastjanowicz, Sebastyanowicz, Siemaszko, Siemaszkowicz, Siemniszko, Skrzyński, Slepść, Smoszewski, Steckowicz, Stoma, Sudimont, Sudymont, Sudywoj, Sulgotowski, Suligostowski, Szameit, Szemet, Szemiaka, Szemioth, Szempiński, Szostak, Szostakowski, Szpot, Szpotański, Szpotowski, Sztoc, Sztok, Sztorc, Szwichowski, Ślepść, Śmiałkowski, Śmiglewicz, Talafus, Talento, Talwosz, Tanajewski, Telefus, Thomaszewicz Dunin, Todt, Tomasiewicz, Tomaszewicz, Towtwiłł, Trzebicki, Tumliński, Urbanowicz, Walentynowicz, Waleszyński, Walthek, Waszewicz, Wąs, Wąsowicz, Wąsowicz Dunin, Wąsowicz-Dunin, Weissenhoff, Weyssenhoff, Węcewicz, Widejko, Wodziradzki, Wojeński, Wojsik, Wojszyk, Wojtkiewicz, Wolski, Wolski-Dunin, Wołodkiewicz, Wołodkowicz, Woronicki, Woyszko, Woytkiewicz, Wozgiełowicz, Zawisza, Zalewski, Zbarzyński, Zborzyński, Zburzyński, Zuchowski, Żuchowski, Żukowski

Łabędź (Polish for "Swan") is a Polish coat of arms. It was used by many knightly and noble families in Polish in medieval Poland and later under the Polish–Lithuanian Commonwealth, branches of the original medieval Duninowie (Łabędzie) magnate family as well as families connected with the Clan by adoption.

== Blazon ==
Gules a swan passant Argent beaked and legged Or.

== Notable bearers ==
Notable bearers of this coat of arms have included:

- Dunin family
  - Piotr Włostowic (1080–1153)
  - Marcin Dunin archbishop
  - Hrabia, Grand Duke (Count, Grand Duke) Rodryg Dunin (1870–1928)
  - Hrabia Antoni Dunin (1907–1939)
- Ortynski family
  - Stanisław Kostka Ortynski
  - Soter Ortynsky O.S.B.M., bishop (1866–1916)
  - Josef Ritter von Ortynski, mayor of Chernivtsi
  - Liubomyr Ortynskyi
- Teodor Bujnicki
- Mszczuj of Skrzynno
- Lucjan Żeligowski
- August Zaleski
- Krzysztof Zawisza
- Stanislav Szemet
- Michail Szemet (Шемет)

== Gallery ==
Counts Dunin-Borkowski

Byliński

Chróścieski

Gromadzki

Szpot variations

Szpot, standard version

Szpot I a

Szpot I b

Szpot I c

Szpot I d

Szpot I e

Szpot II

Szpot II

Szpot II a

== See also ==
- Polish heraldry
- Heraldic family
- List of Polish nobility coats of arms

== Bibliography ==
- Tadeusz Gajl: Herbarz polski od średniowiecza do XX wieku : ponad 4500 herbów szlacheckich 37 tysięcy nazwisk 55 tysięcy rodów. L&L, 2007. ISBN 978-83-60597-10-1.
- Herby szlachty polskiej, S. Górzyński, J.Kochanowski, Warszawa 1992.
