= Carmen Mauri =

Medieval Polish Poem

Carmen Mauri, known in English as the Song of a Maur, is an anonymous Polish medieval poem written in Latin. It tells the story of Polish nobleman and magnate Piotr Włast (Peter Wlast) and his rebellion against Duke Władysław II the Exile. The poem has survived only in fragmentary form. Its author and exact date of creation is unknown, it is presumed that the author was a Benedictine monk and the poem was written between the second half of the 12th century and the beginning of the 14th century.

== Bibliography ==
- Vauchez, Andre (2001). Encyclopedia of Middle Ages. Routledge. p. 303. ISBN 978-1-57958-282-1.
- Knoll, Paul W. (1976-04-15). "Learning in Late Piast Poland". Proceedings of the American Philosophical Society. 120 (2): 136–157.
- "Cronica Petri Comitis Poloniae" together with the "Carmen Mauri", ed. M. Plezia, Kraków 1951. IHL Series 2 volume 3.
- Mały słownik pisarzy polskich, 1969 (in Polish)
