= Rodryg Dunin =

Rodryg Dunin (June 26, 1870 – October 26, 1928) was a Polish noble (szlachta), a hrabia (Count), and an industrialist and an agriculturalist. His work in agricultural industry, including pioneering new techniques, earned him recognition among the farming circles of early 20th century Greater Poland.

== Biography ==
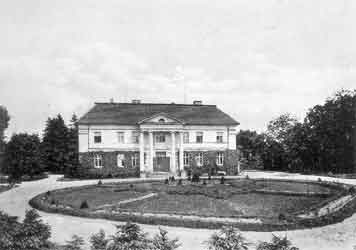
Rodryg and Lucia's home in Granówko, Kościan County

Rodryg Dunin was born in Marszewo, Kreis Pleschen, Province of Posen, to Stanisław Tadeusz Dunin (a participant in the 19th century January Uprising), and Maria-Antonina Baranowska (daughter of the Poznań playwright Agnieszka Baranowska). He was a student at Maria Magdalena Gymnasium (high school) in Poznań, where he participated actively in a secret Polish educational-social youth movement, and later studied at academies in Tetschen (Děčín), Bohemia, and Leipzig, Saxony.

He married Lucia (Łucja) Taczanowska (1862-1917), the widow of Stanisław Nieżychowski (1851-1897), and became the stepfather of her six children. Among his own children by the marriage was Stanisław Antoni Piotr Dunin, an army officer who received the Virtuti Militari award.

== Estate ==
Rodryg Dunin's estate was in Granówko, Kreis Kosten. Formerly the seat of the Nieżychowski family, it came into the hands of the Dunins following the 1898 marriage. The mansion was built by Nepomucen Nieżychowski, who owned the estate at the time. In 1923, he passed Granówek to his oldest stepson, Józef Nieżychowski, and bought the Ruchocice manor near Grodzisk Wielkopolski from Tiedemann, an HKT member. Dunin would later use Ruchocice to provide an orphanage aiming to protect Polish children from Germanization.

== Industry and agriculture ==
Dunin played an important role in Greater Poland agricultural-industrial organizations, including serving as a councillor of the Poznańskie Ziemstwo Kredytowe and holding seats on the boards of numerous institutions. His capacity to both introduce new techniques and to balance with traditions earned him a reputation among Polish farmers for modernity and innovation. He founded an alcohol factory, local train, and in 1912 installed the first rain-based irrigation system in the Poznań area. He mentored young farmers and was invited to lecture in contemporary centers of farmer education, both in Poznań and Warsaw.

== See also ==
- Dunin (surname), other figures who share the family name
