= Taczanowski =

Family coat of arms: Jastrzębiec.

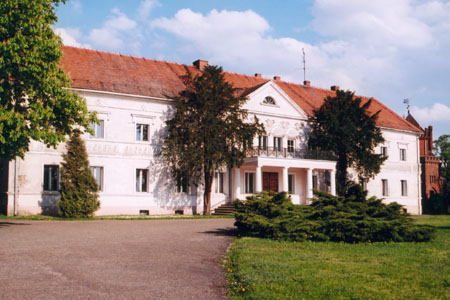
Taczanow Palace, Poland (late 18th century; expansions in 1853-57 and 1922)

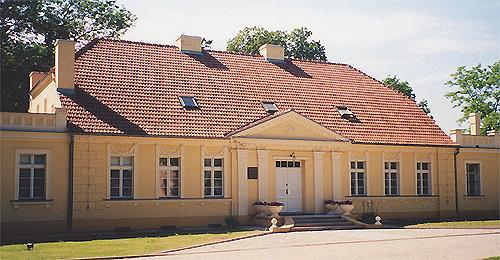
Choryń Manor, Poland (late 18th century)

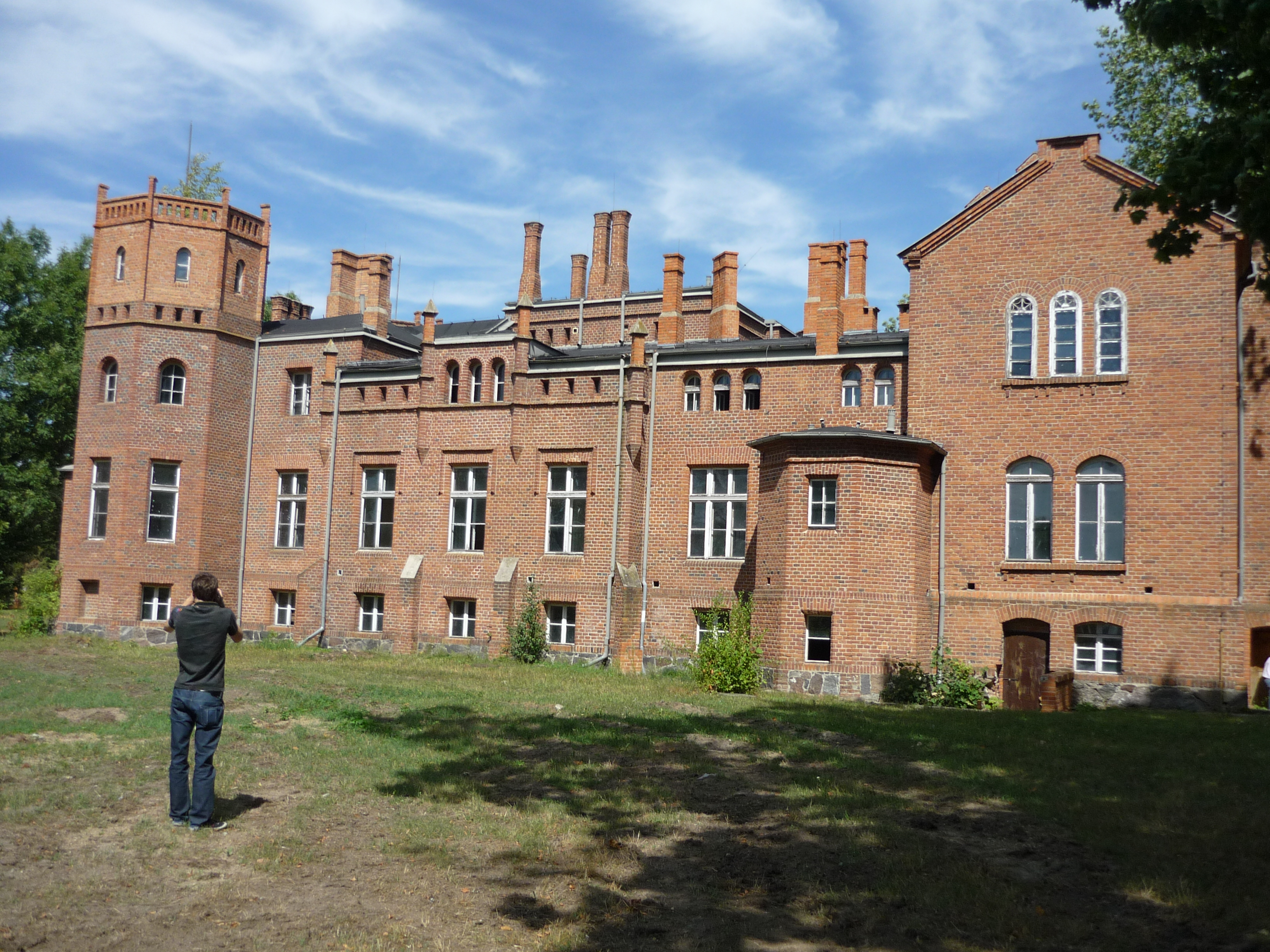
Podrzecze Castle, near Gostyń, Poland (nineteenth century)

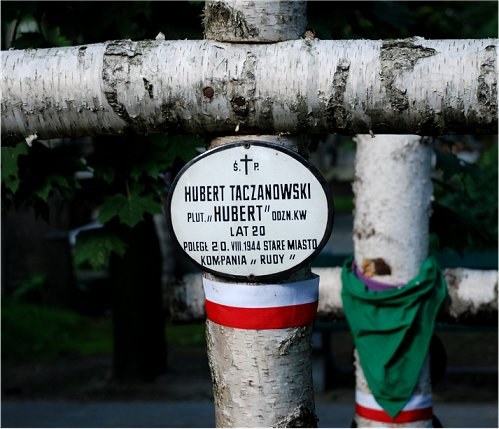
Grave of Warsaw Uprising Home Army officer Hubert Taczanowski (1924–1944)

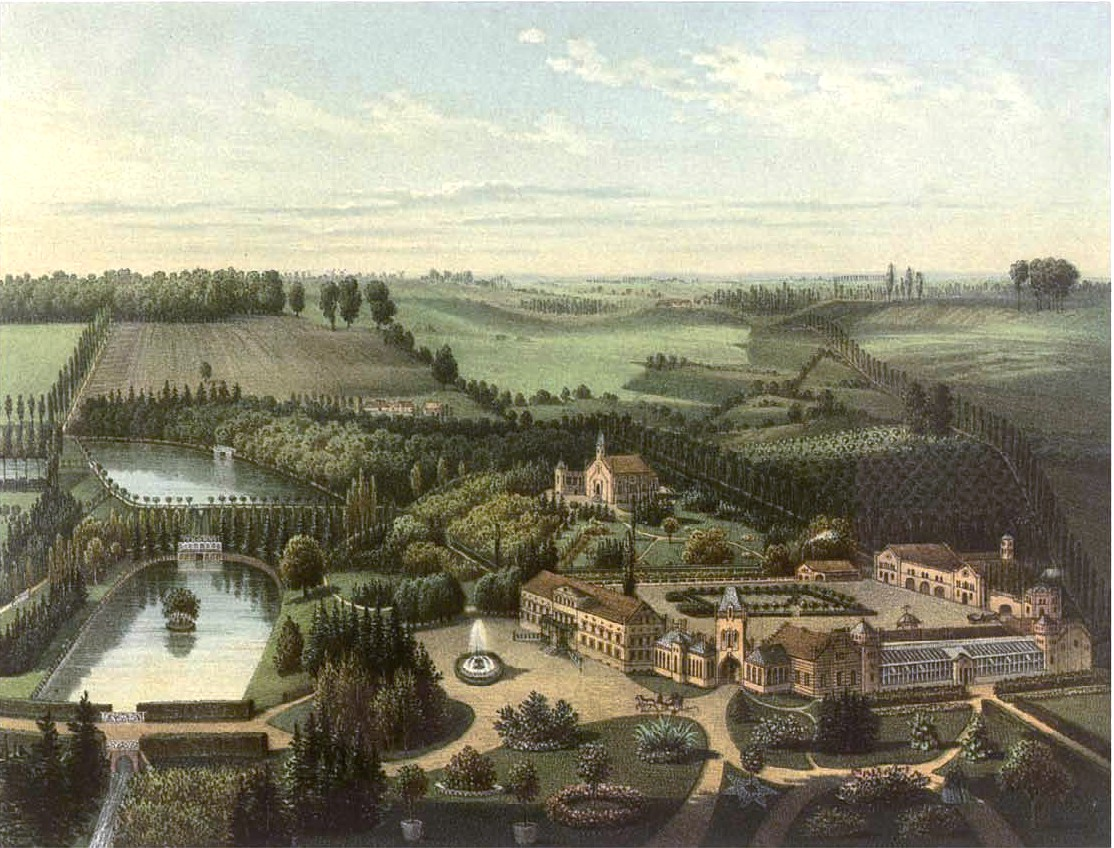
Palace Taczanowo around 1860, Edition by Duncker

Taczanowski (Polish feminine: Taczanowska; plural: Taczanowscy) is the surname of a Polish szlachta (nobility) family from Poznań bearing the Jastrzębiec coat of arms and the motto: Plus penser que dire. They took their name from their estate Taczanów in the 15th century and by the 19th century were among the leading magnates in partitioned-Poland. Members of the family are historically significant religious, political, scientific, and military figures. The family was granted the title of count by King Friedrich Wilhelm IV of Prussia in 1857. The Austrian branch of the family, which spells the name Dassanowsky, came to Vienna with the forces of King Jan Sobieski during the Battle of Vienna in 1683.

== Notable members ==
- Jan Scibor Taczanowski (15th century–1468), voivode of Łęczyca c. 1437
- Andrzej Taczanowski (c. 1660–18th century), knight commander under King Sobieski during the Turkish Siege (Battle of Vienna) of 1683
- Rafael Taczanowski (18th century), head of the Jesuit Order in Poland
- Jan Taczanowski (1753–19th century), Lord High Steward of Trembowia (now known as Terebovlya)
- Count Alfons Anton Felix von Taczanow-Taczanowski (1815–1867), member of the Prussian House of Lords
- Władysław Taczanowski (1819–1890), zoologist
- Wladislaw von Taczanowski (1825–1893), politician; Prussian parliamentary representative
- Edmund Taczanowski (1833–1879), general and Polish patriot; in Italy with Giuseppe Garibaldi
- Hubert Taczanowski (1960–2024), cinematographer

== Coat of arms ==
Coat of Arms of Count Alfons Taczanowski (1854)

== See also ==
- Dassanowsky

== Selected literature ==
- Gothaisches Taschenbuch der gräflichen Häuser, Perthes Verlag, Gotha 1857–1870
- P.P. Paprocki, Herby Rycerstwa polskiego, Kraków 1858
- Genealogisches Taschenbuch der Ritter- und Adelsgeschlechter (Brünner Taschenbuch), Brünn 1890
- Teodor Zychlinski, Zlota Ksiega szlachty polskiej, Poznań 1879–1908
- Stefan Graf von Szydlow-Szydlowski und Nikolaus R. von Pastinszky, Der polnische und litauische Hochadel, Budapest 1944
- Simon Konarski, Armorial de la noblesse polonaise titrée, Paris 1958
- Günther Berger, "Die Familie v. Dassanowsky: Die kaisertreue österreichische Linie des polnischen Grafenhauses Taczanowski zu Taczanow," Krone und Reich: Zeitschrift des Verbandes der Österreicher zur Wahrung der Geschichte Österreichs, 1/2 1999, 13–15.
- Genealogisches Handbuch des Adels, Adelslexikon Band XIV, Band 131 der Gesamtreihe, C. A. Starke Verlag, Limburg (Lahn) 2003, ISSN 0435-2408.
