= Kleinert =

Kleinert is a surname. Notable people with the surname include:

- Claudia Kleinert (born 1969), German television presenter
- Detlef Kleinert (1932-2016), German politician
- Hagen Kleinert (born 1941), German physicist
- Paul Kleinert (1837-1920), German theologician
