= Paczkowski =

Paczkowski [pat͡ʂˈkɔvski] (with its female form Paczkowska [pat͡ʂˈkɔvska]) is a Polish surname. It is of toponymic origin, deriving either from Paczkowo or Paczków, the names of several small settlements in north central and south western Poland respectively.

Notable people with the name Paczkowski include:

- Andrzej Paczkowski (1938–2026), Polish historian and academic
- Jacek Paczkowski (born 1981), Polish footballer
- Małgorzata Prokop-Paczkowska (born 1960), Polish politician
- Paweł Paczkowski, Polish handball player
- Ray Paczkowski (born 1974), American keyboardist
