= Paszkowski =

Paszkowski (feminine Paszkowska) is a Polish surname. Notable people with the surname include:

- Cezary Paszkowski (born 1948), Polish artist
- Walter Paszkowski (born 1934), Canadian politician

== See also ==
- Paczkowski
