= Satok =

Satok may refer to:

- Sątok
- Satok (state constituency), represented in the Sarawak State Legislative Assembly
