= Conciliation cross =

Stone cross set up where a murder or accident happened

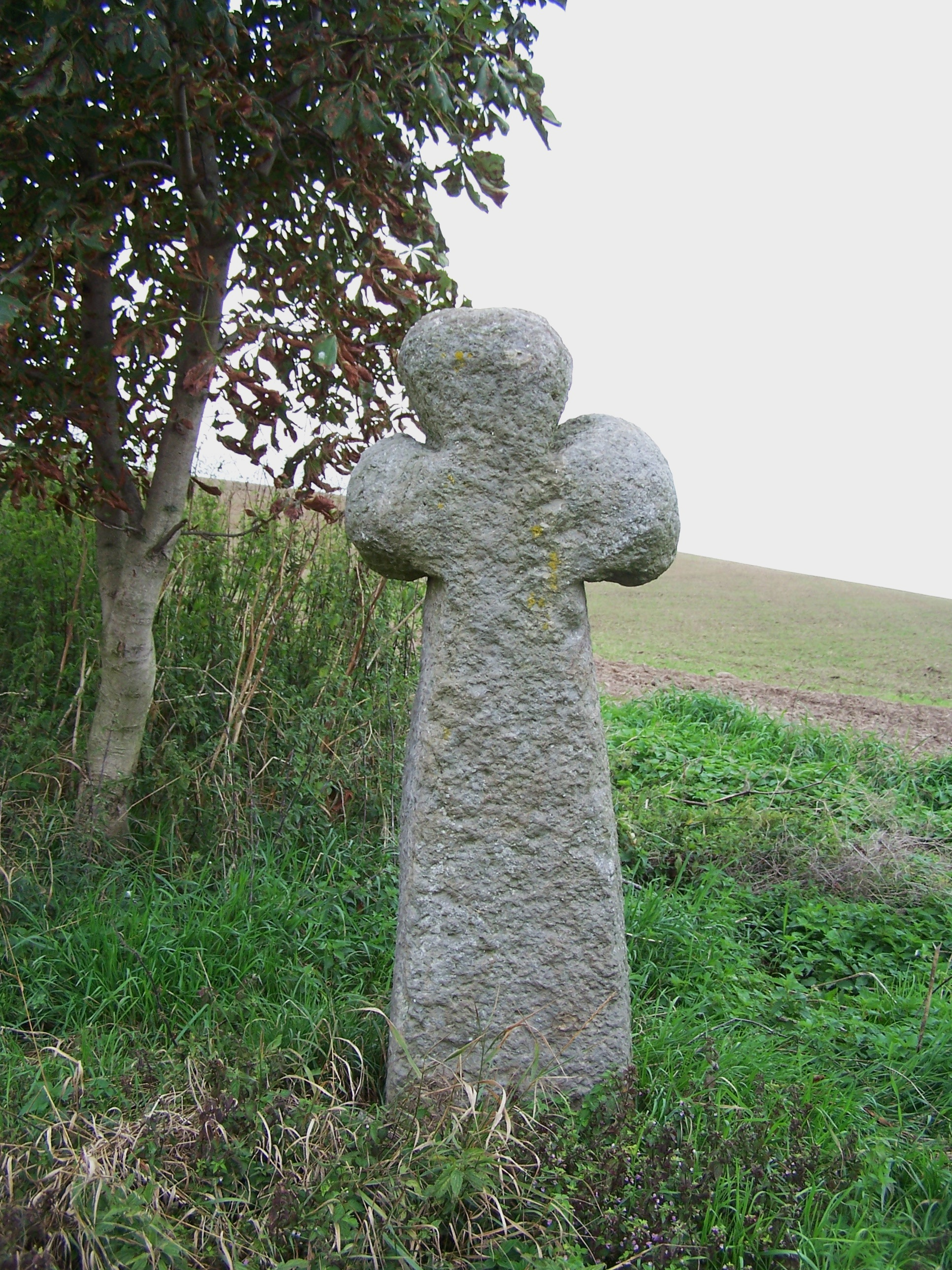
Conciliation cross near Jaroměř, the largest in the Czech Republic

Conciliation cross, also known as roadside cross or penitence cross, is a stone cross, which was set up in a place where a murder or accident had happened. It occurs mainly in Central Europe.

== Purpose ==
In the Middle Ages and in the early modern period, the conciliation crosses were erected as a symbol of penance for crime, most often for murder. If the perpetrator of the murder was not punished according to the law, he concluded a contract with the family of the victim or with the town council, which included the obligation to erect a stone cross. The culprit usually had to create it by his own hands.

Many of the conciliation crosses are associated with local legends. They are considered to be one of the oldest monuments of law in the Czech lands.

== Occurrence and research ==
In 1983, the Society for the Research of Stone Crosses was established under the auspices of the Aš Museum in the Czech Republic. The society created a register of stone crosses in the Czech Republic and takes care of their protection. The company registers 2,685 conciliation crosses in the Czech Republic and 273 in other countries, especially in Central Europe.

The conciliation cross near Jaroměř is considered the largest in the Czech Republic. It has a height of 1.67 m (5 ft 6 in).

== Gallery ==
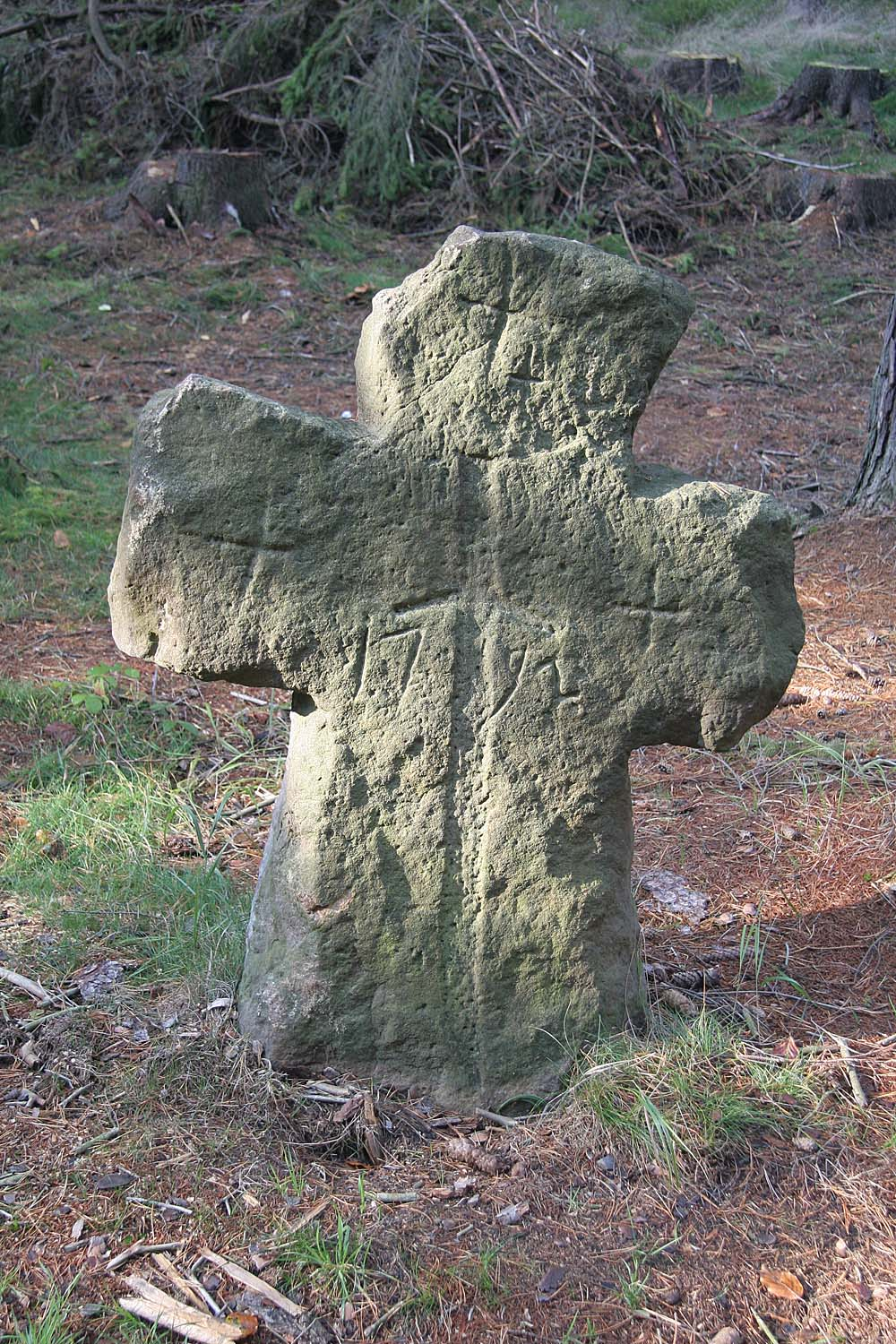
Conciliation cross close to Růžová, Czech Republic

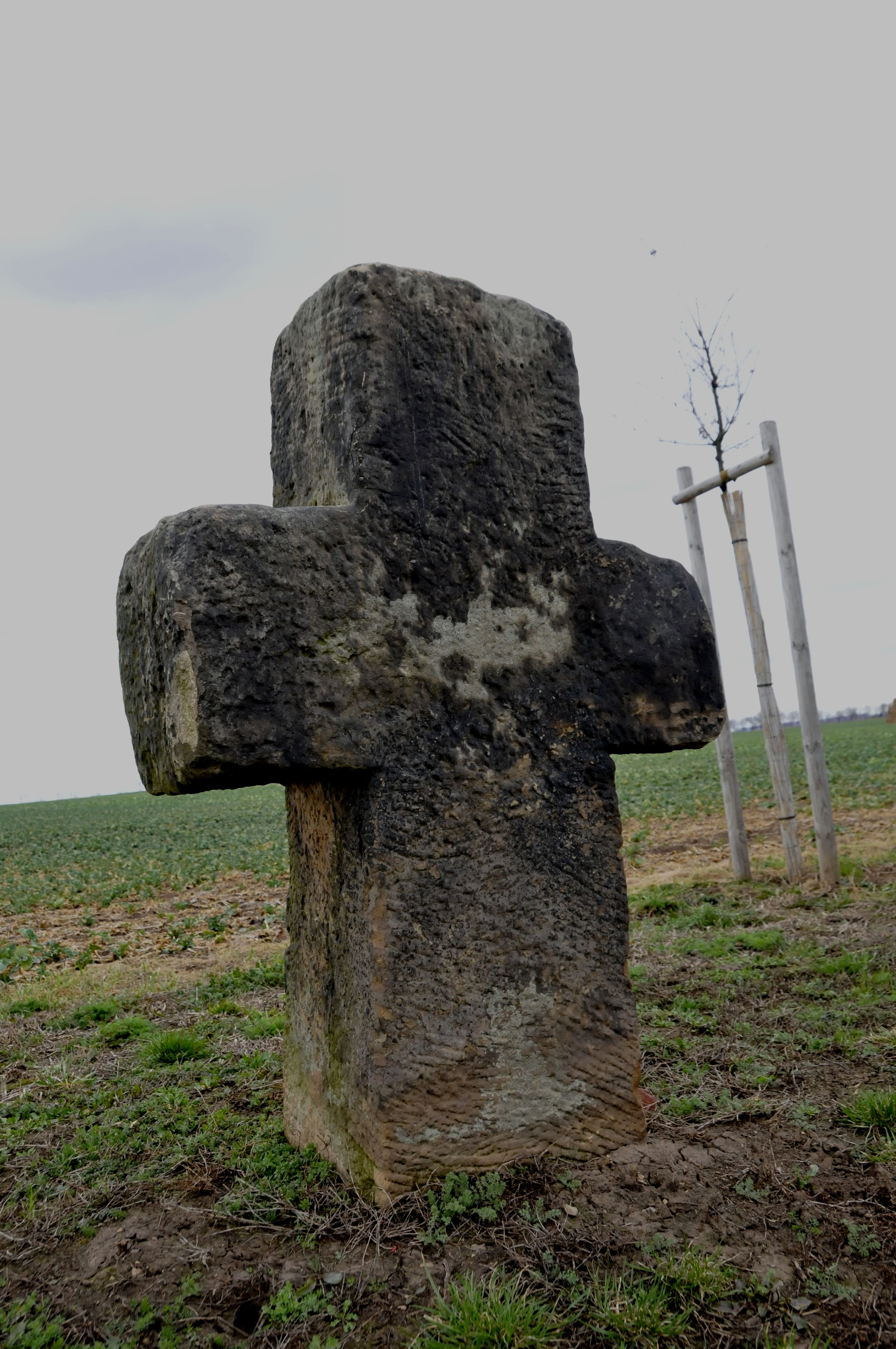
Conciliation cross close to Kleinrettbach, Germany

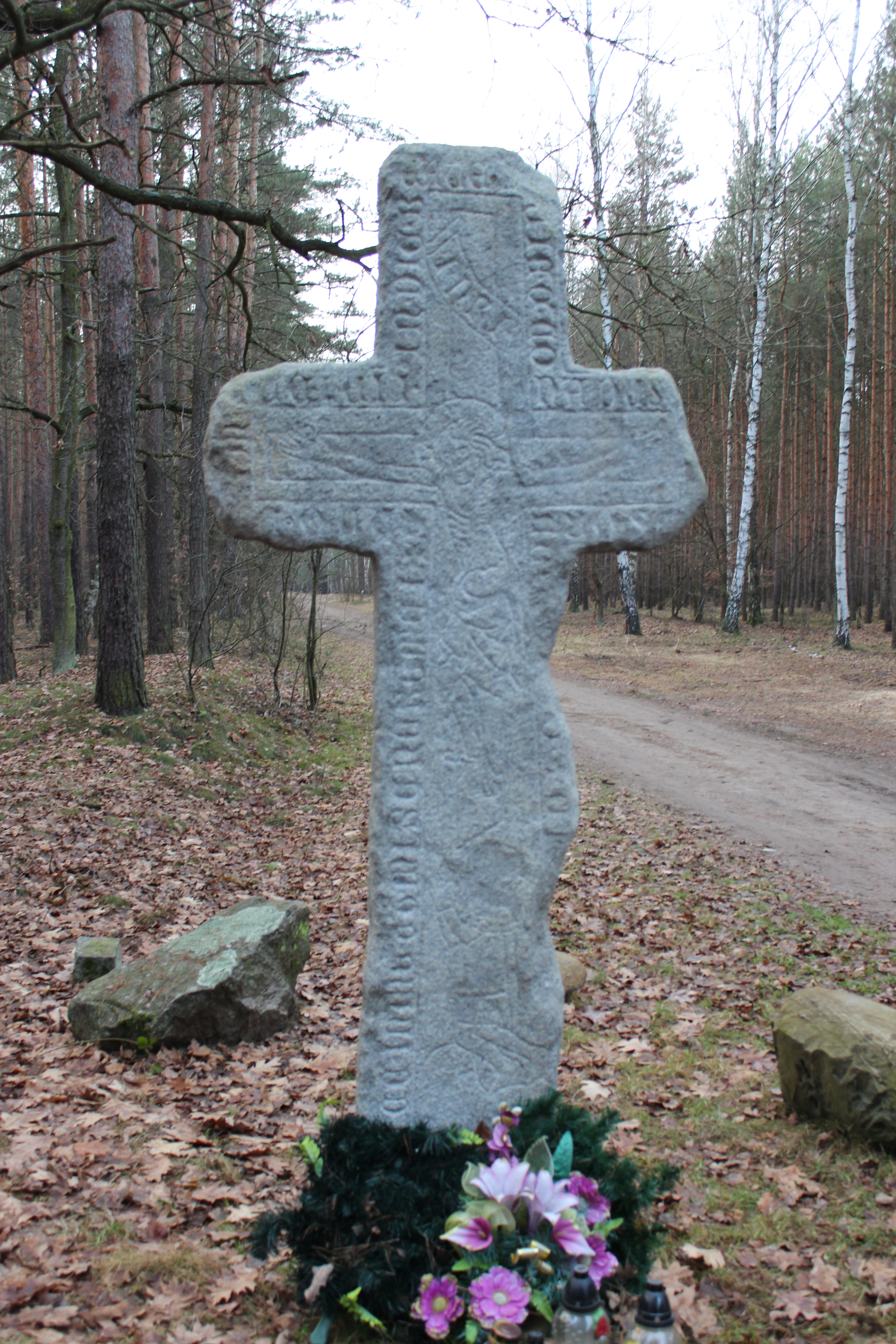
Conciliation cross close to Kijowice, Poland

== See also ==
- Wayside shrine
- Roadside memorial
