= Gorzesław =

- Village
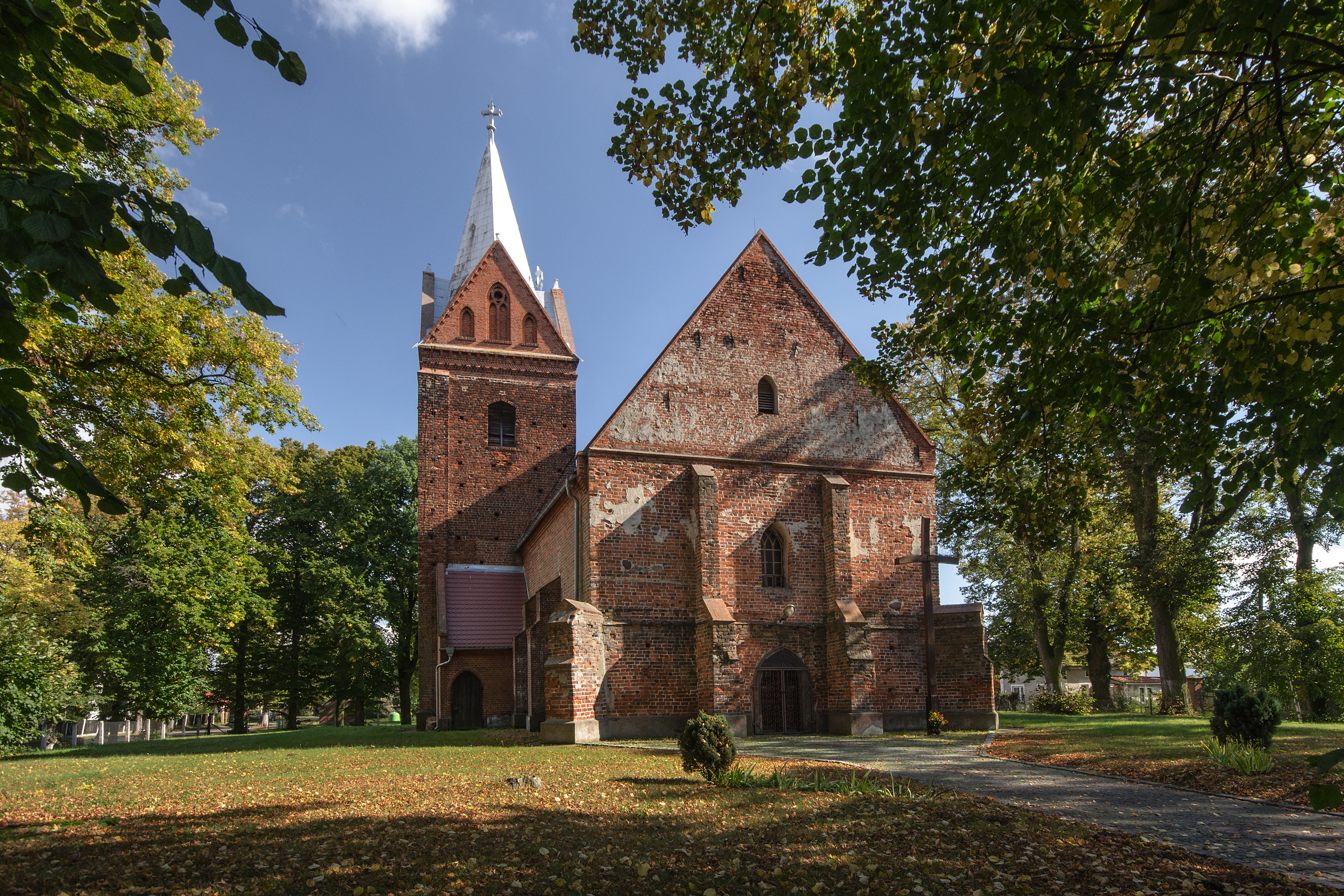
- Catholic church

- Location within Poland
- Coordinates: 51°09′58″N 17°32′46″E
- Country: Poland
- Voivodeship: Lower Silesian
- County: Oleśnica
- Gmina: Bierutów

Gorzesław [ɡɔˈʐɛswaf] is a village in the administrative district of Gmina Bierutów, within Oleśnica County, Lower Silesian Voivodeship, in south-western Poland.
