= Zbytowa =

- Village
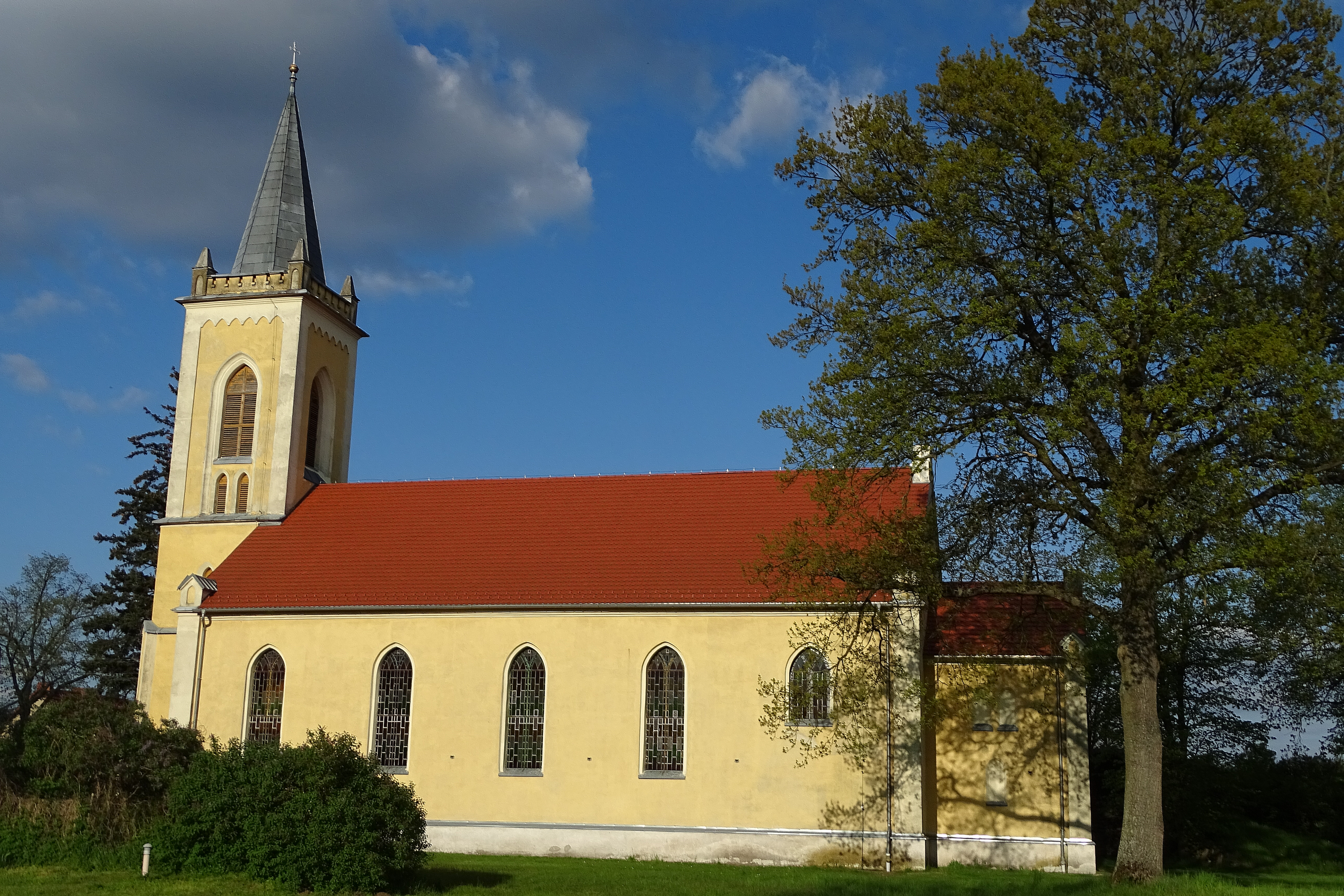
- Catholic church

- Location within Poland
- Coordinates: 51°7′N 17°25′E
- Country: Poland
- Voivodeship: Lower Silesian
- County: Oleśnica
- Gmina: Bierutów

Zbytowa [zbɨˈtɔva] is a village in the administrative district of Gmina Bierutów, within Oleśnica County, Lower Silesian Voivodeship, in south-western Poland.

== Notable residents ==
- Paul Kleinert (1837–1920), German theologian
