= Solniki Małe =

- Village
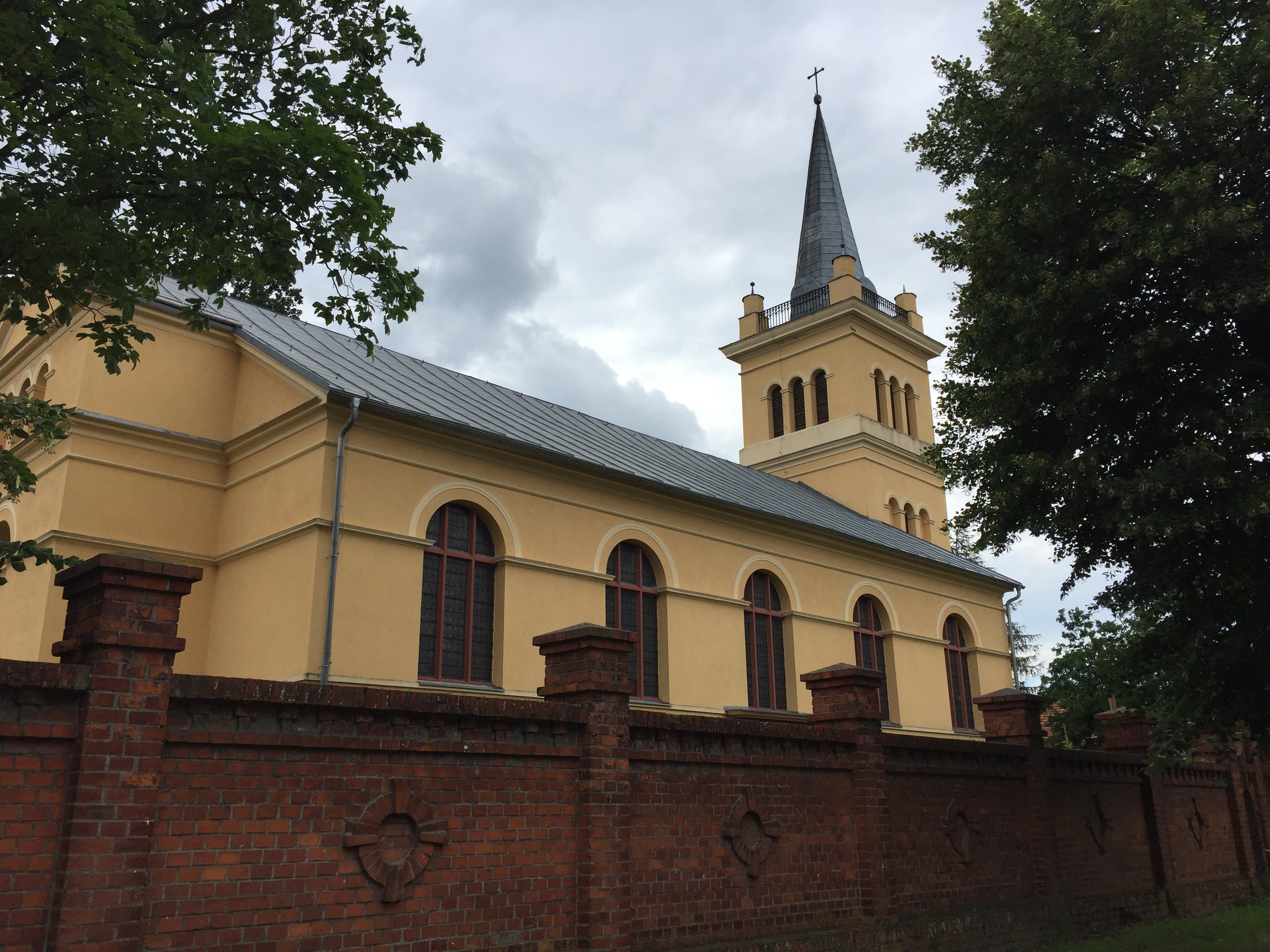
- Catholic church

- Location within Poland
- Coordinates: 51°8′N 17°32′E
- Country: Poland
- Voivodeship: Lower Silesian
- County: Oleśnica
- Gmina: Bierutów

Solniki Małe [sɔlˈniki ˈmawɛ] is a village in the administrative district of Gmina Bierutów, within Oleśnica County, Lower Silesian Voivodeship, in south-western Poland.
