= Gmina Bierutów =

Gmina Bierutów Bierutów Commune
- Gmina
- Coat of arms
- Interactive map of Gmina Bierutów
- Coordinates (Bierutów): 51°08′N 17°32′E
- Country: Poland
- Voivodeship: Lower Silesian
- County: Oleśnica
- Seat: Bierutów
- Sołectwos: Gorzesław, Jemielna, Karwiniec, Kijowice, Kruszowice, Paczków, Posadowice, Radzieszyn, Sątok, Solniki Małe, Solniki Wielkie, Stronia, Strzałkowa, Wabienice, Zawidowice, Zbytowa

Area
  - Total: 147.07 km^{2} (56.78 sq mi)

Population (2019-06-30)
  - Total: 9,963
  - Density: 67.74/km^{2} (175.5/sq mi)
  - Urban: 4,867
  - Rural: 5,096
- Website: http://www.bierutow.pl/

Gmina Bierutów is an urban-rural gmina (administrative district) in Oleśnica County, Lower Silesian Voivodeship, in south-western Poland. Its seat is the town of Bierutów, which lies approximately 13 kilometres (8 mi) south-east of Oleśnica, and 35 kilometres (22 mi) east of the regional capital Wrocław. It is part of the Wrocław metropolitan area.

The gmina covers an area of 147.07 square kilometres (56.8 sq mi). As of 2019, its total population was 9,963.

== Neighbouring gminas ==
Gmina Bierutów is bordered by the gminas of Czernica, Dziadowa Kłoda, Jelcz-Laskowice, Namysłów, Oleśnica and Wilków.

== Villages ==
Apart from the town of Bierutów, the gmina contains the villages of Gorzesław, Jemielna, Karwiniec, Kijowice, Kruszowice, Paczków, Posadowice, Radzieszyn, Sątok, Solniki Małe, Solniki Wielkie, Stronia, Strzałkowa, Wabienice, Zawidowice and Zbytowa.

== Twin towns and sister cities ==
Gmina Bierutów is twinned with:

- Bernstadt auf dem Eigen, Germany
