= Zawidowice, Lower Silesian Voivodeship =

Zawidowice
- Village
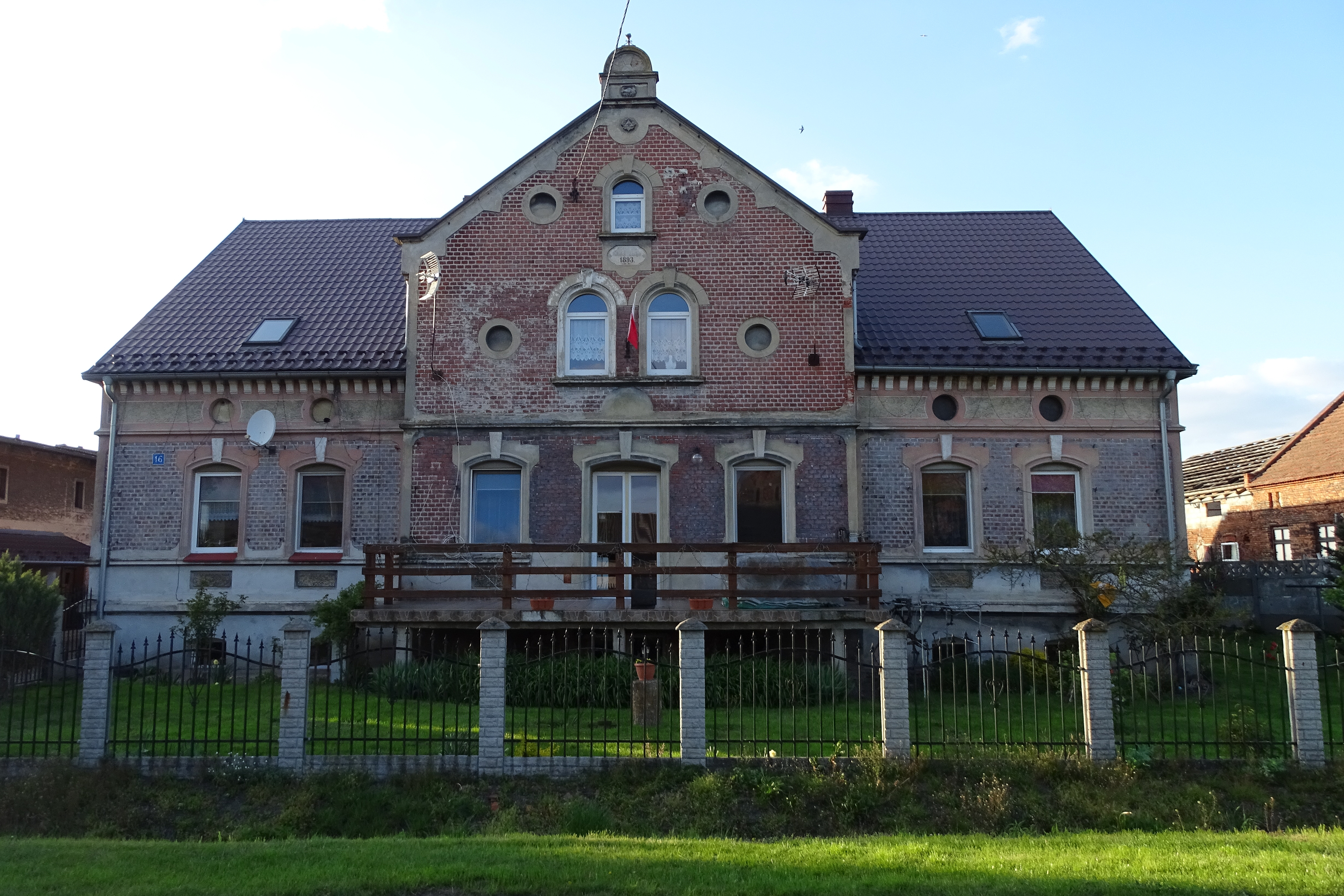

- Location within Poland
- Coordinates: 51°8′N 17°28′E
- Country: Poland
- Voivodeship: Lower Silesian
- County: Oleśnica
- Gmina: Bierutów

Zawidowice [zavidɔˈvit͡sɛ] is a village in the administrative district of Gmina Bierutów, within Oleśnica County, Lower Silesian Voivodeship, in south-western Poland.
