= Kruszowice =

- Village
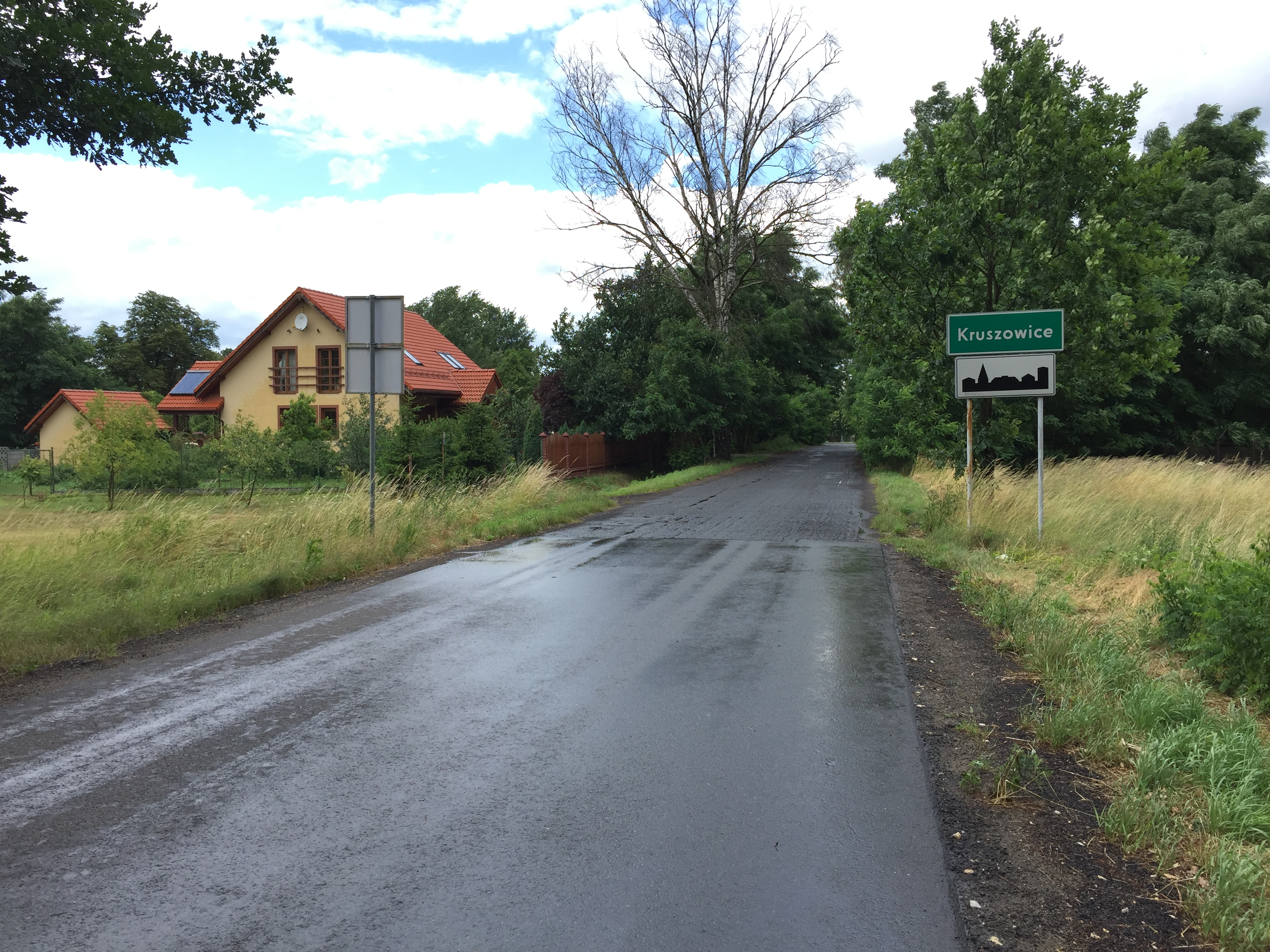

- Location within Poland
- Coordinates: 51°7′N 17°31′E
- Country: Poland
- Voivodeship: Lower Silesian
- County: Oleśnica
- Gmina: Bierutów

Kruszowice [kruʂɔˈvit͡sɛ] is a village in the administrative district of Gmina Bierutów, within Oleśnica County, Lower Silesian Voivodeship, in south-western Poland.
