= Stronia =

- Village
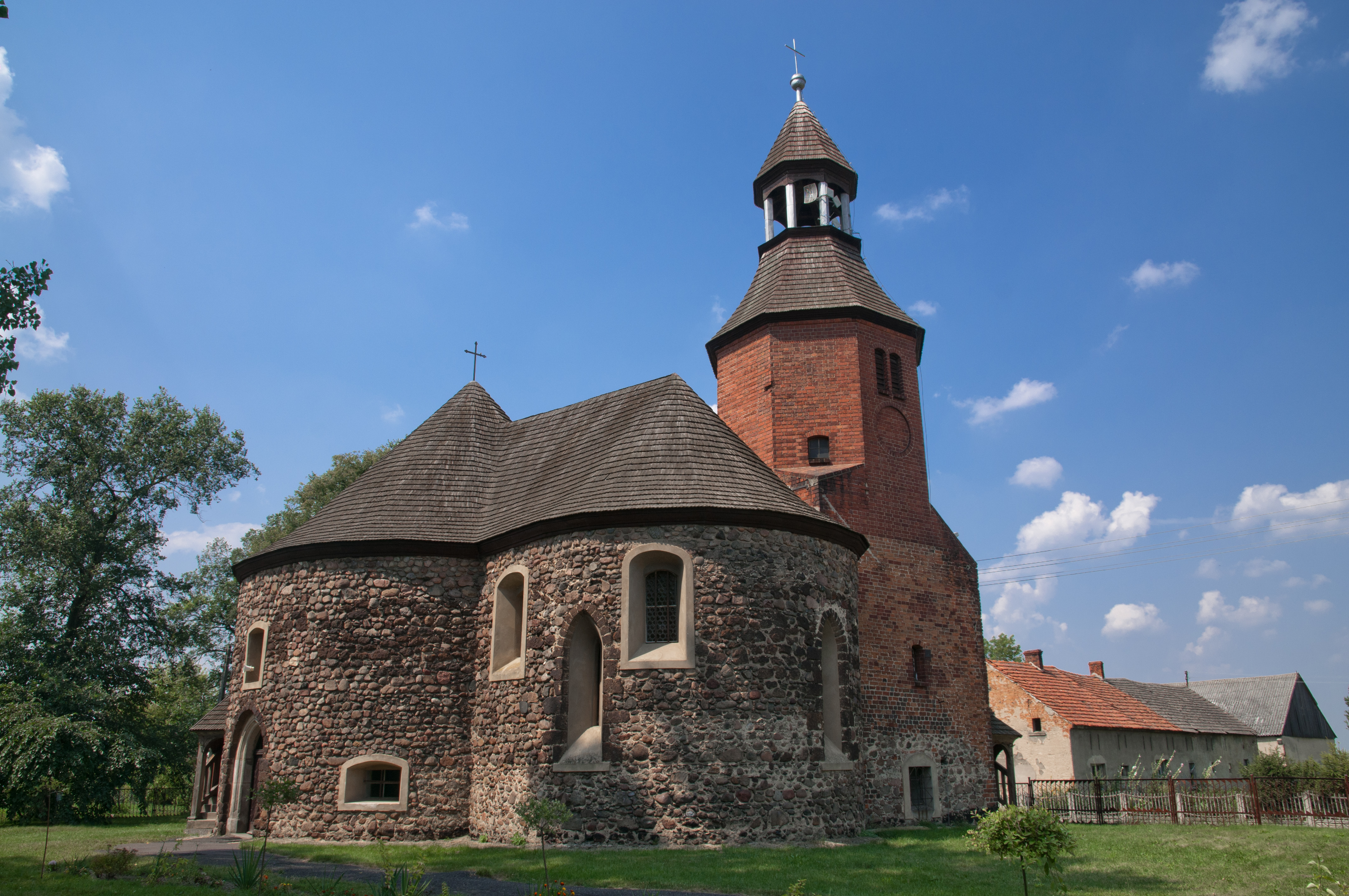
- Catholic church

- Location within Poland
- Coordinates: 51°12′N 17°32′E
- Country: Poland
- Voivodeship: Lower Silesian
- County: Oleśnica
- Gmina: Bierutów
- Highest elevation: 180 m (590 ft)
- Lowest elevation: 175 m (574 ft)
- Population: 554

Stronia [ˈstrɔɲa] is a village in the administrative district of Gmina Bierutów, within Oleśnica County, Lower Silesian Voivodeship, in south-western Poland.
