= Bierutów =

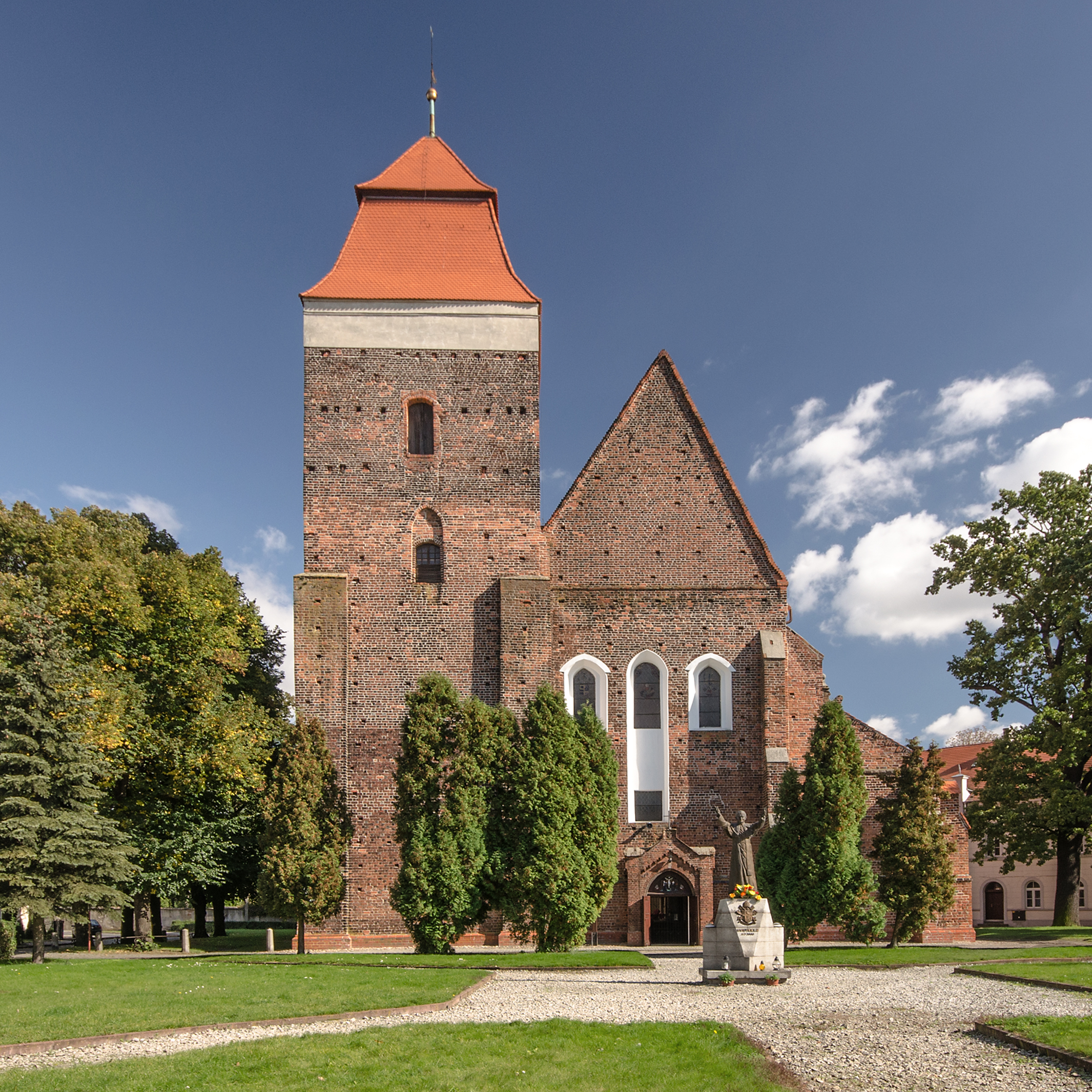
- Saint Catherine church in Bierutów

- Coat of arms

- Location within Poland
- Coordinates: 51°7′30″N 17°32′30″E
- Country: Poland
- Voivodeship: Lower Silesian
- County: Oleśnica
- Gmina: Bierutów
- Town rights: 1266

Government
  - Mayor: Piotr Sawicki

Area
  - Total: 8.36 km^{2} (3.23 sq mi)
- Highest elevation: 167 m (548 ft)
- Lowest elevation: 137 m (449 ft)

Population (31 December 2021)
  - Total: 4,728
  - Density: 566/km^{2} (1,470/sq mi)
- Time zone: UTC+1 (CET)
  - Summer (DST): UTC+2 (CEST)
- Postal code: 56-420
- Area code: +48 71
- Vehicle registration: DOL
- Website: http://www.bierutow.pl

Bierutów [bʲɛˈrutuf] (German: Bernstadt in Schlesien) is a town in Oleśnica County, Lower Silesian Voivodeship, in south-western Poland. It is the seat of the administrative district (gmina) called Gmina Bierutów.

As of December 2021, the town has a population of 4,728. Its castle is believed to date to the 13th century, and was the headquarters of the local forestry body after World War II.

It was granted town rights in 1266.

== Geography ==
Bierutów is situated on the Widawa river, approximately 2 mi (3 km) south-east of Oleśnica.

== Government ==
=== List of mayors since 1990 ===
Name	Years in office
Bogdan Smolarczyk	1990–1992
Andrzej Wojtkowiak	1992–1997
Edward Puk	1997–1998
Włodzimierz Kubiak	1998–2002
Roman Kazimierski	2002–2004
Grzegorz Michalak	2004–2006
Władysław Bogusław Kobiałka	2006–2018
Piotr Sawicki	since 2018

== Twin towns and sister cities ==
See twin towns of Gmina Bierutów.

== Notable people ==
- Andreas Acoluthus (1654–1704), German scholar of orientalism
- Louise Elisabeth of Württemberg-Oels (1673–1736)
- Wilhelm Sihler (1801–1885), German-American Lutheran minister and educator
- Maximilian von Prittwitz (1848–1917), Prussian general
- Josef Block (1863–1943), German painter
- Horace Kallen (1882–1974), German-American philosopher
- Ludwig Meidner (1884–1966), German expressionist painter
