= Paczków (disambiguation) =

Paczków may refer to the following places in Poland:

- Paczków, a town in Nysa County, Opole Voivodeship (SW Poland)
- Paczków, Lower Silesian Voivodeship, a village in the administrative district of Gmina Bierutówa in Oleśnica County, Lower Silesian Voivodeship (SW Poland)
