= Bierutów Castle =

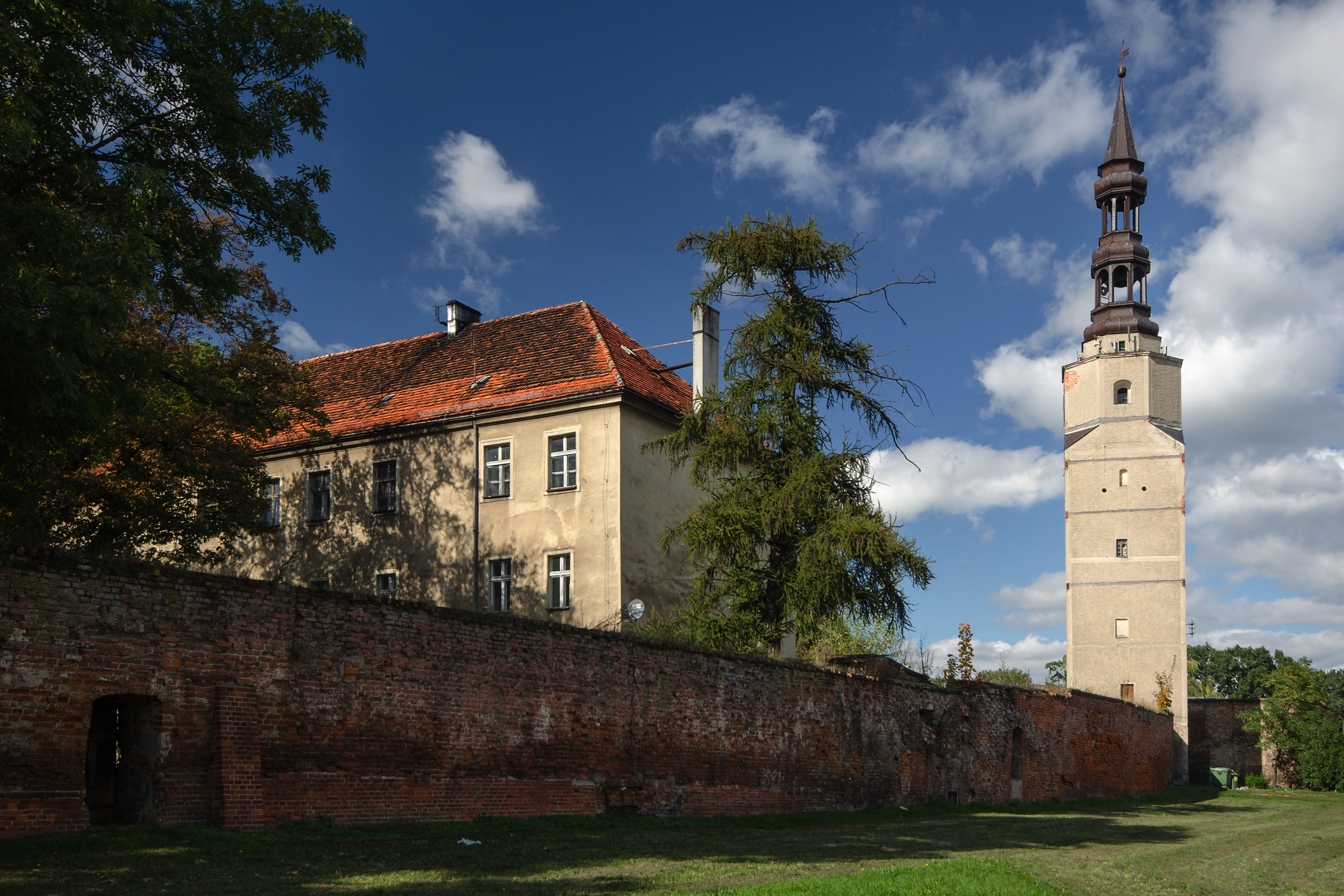
- Bierutów Castle

- Location of the Bierutów Castle in Poland Bierutów Castle (Lower Silesian Voivodeship)
- 51°07′25″N 17°32′33″E

History
- Built: 14th century
- Rebuilt: 17th, 19th centuries

Site notes
- Architectural style: Renaissance

Bierutów Castle (Polish: Zamek w Bierutowie, German: Schloss Bernstadt) is a castle in Bierutów, Poland. The Gothic structure is believed to have been built in the 13th century under the orders of Henry III the White, Duke of Wrocław. It underwent renovation in the Renaissance style between 1534 and 1540, but was rebuilt after a fire in 1603 during the rule of Henry Wenceslaus, Duke of Oels-Bernstadt. Later that century, Christian Urlich Wirtemberg renovated the castle, adding another floor and a Baroque portal in the south wing. It underwent extensive redevelopment in the 19th century, replacing the ruined porches, and in 1899 the north wing was completely renovated.

Since World War II it has served as the headquarters of the Forest Inspectorate of Bierutów, accommodation for forestry workers and the headquarters of the Municipal Enterprise for Communal Management (MPGK), and at one stage was a kindergarten.
