= Solniki Wielkie =

- Village
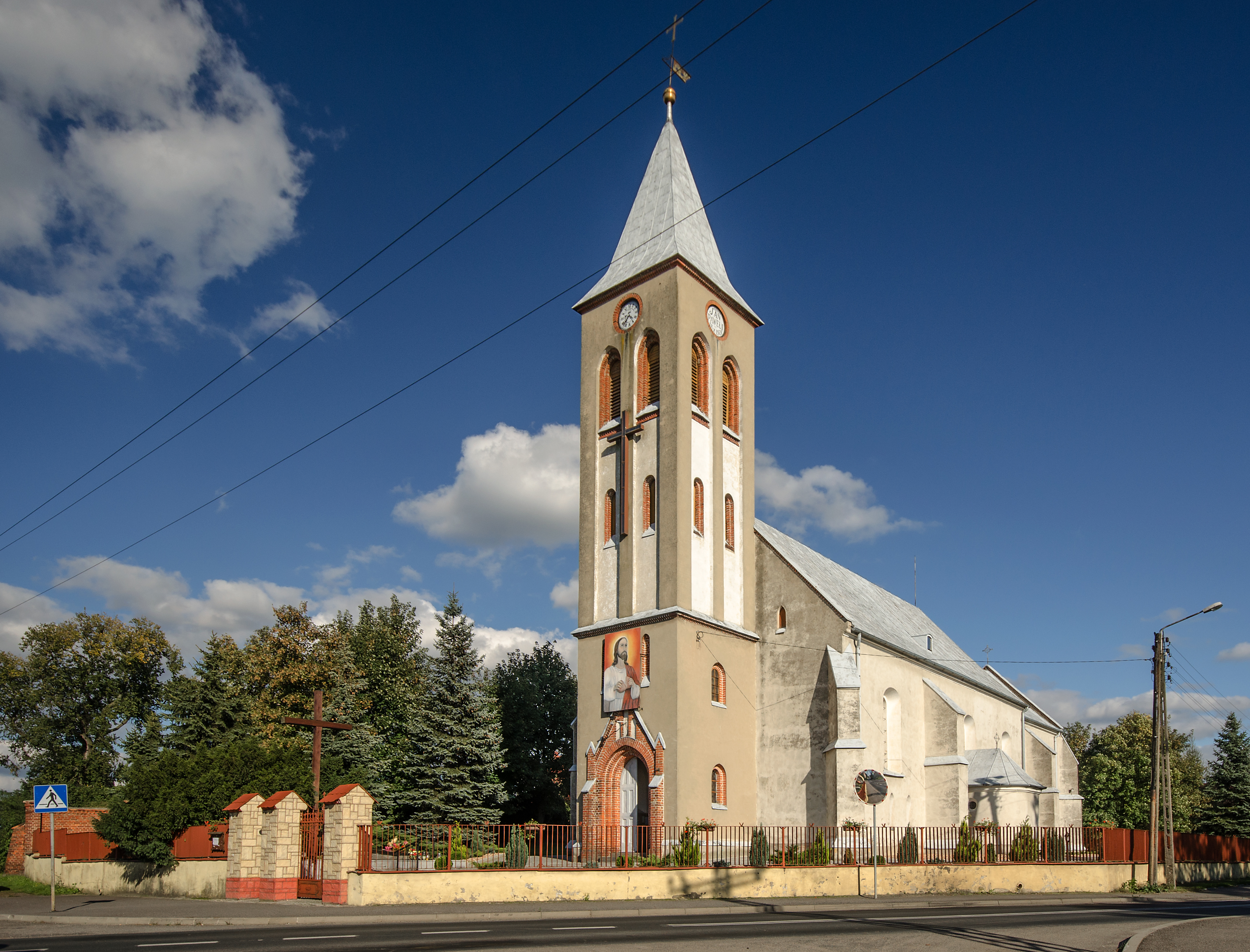
- Catholic church

- Location within Poland
- Coordinates: 51°10′N 17°29′E
- Country: Poland
- Voivodeship: Lower Silesian
- County: Oleśnica
- Gmina: Bierutów

Population
  - Total: 510
- Time zone: UTC+1 (CET)
  - Summer (DST): UTC+2 (CEST)
- Vehicle registration: DOL

Solniki Wielkie [sɔlˈniki ˈvjɛlkʲɛ] is a village in the administrative district of Gmina Bierutów, within Oleśnica County, Lower Silesian Voivodeship, in south-western Poland.
