= Strzałkowa =

- Village
- Location within Poland
- Coordinates: 51°10′16″N 17°30′26″E
- Country: Poland
- Voivodeship: Lower Silesian
- County: Oleśnica
- Gmina: Bierutów

Strzałkowa [stʂau̯ˈkɔva] is a village in the administrative district of Gmina Bierutów, within Oleśnica County, Lower Silesian Voivodeship, in south-western Poland.
