= Karwiniec =

- Village
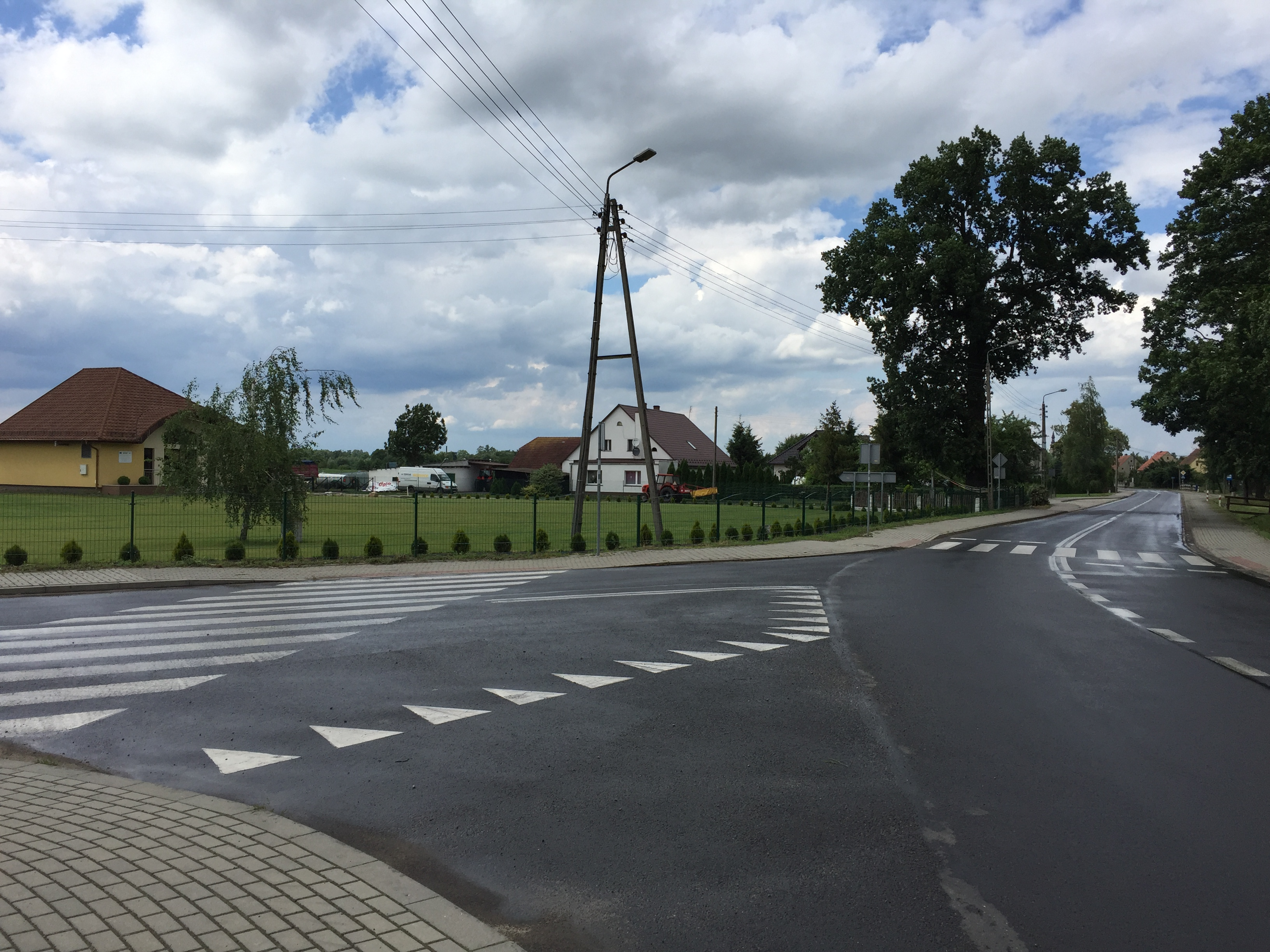

- Location within Poland
- Coordinates: 51°06′45″N 17°32′41″E
- Country: Poland
- Voivodeship: Lower Silesian
- County: Oleśnica
- Gmina: Bierutów

Karwiniec [karˈviɲɛt͡s] is a village in the administrative district of Gmina Bierutów, within Oleśnica County, Lower Silesian Voivodeship, in south-western Poland.
