= Jemielna =

- Village
- Location within Poland
- Coordinates: 51°12′51″N 17°34′24″E
- Country: Poland
- Voivodeship: Lower Silesian
- County: Oleśnica
- Gmina: Bierutów
- Population (approx.): 300

Jemielna [jɛˈmjɛlna] is a village in the administrative district of Gmina Bierutów, within Oleśnica County, Lower Silesian Voivodeship, in south-western Poland.
