= Radzieszyn =

- Village
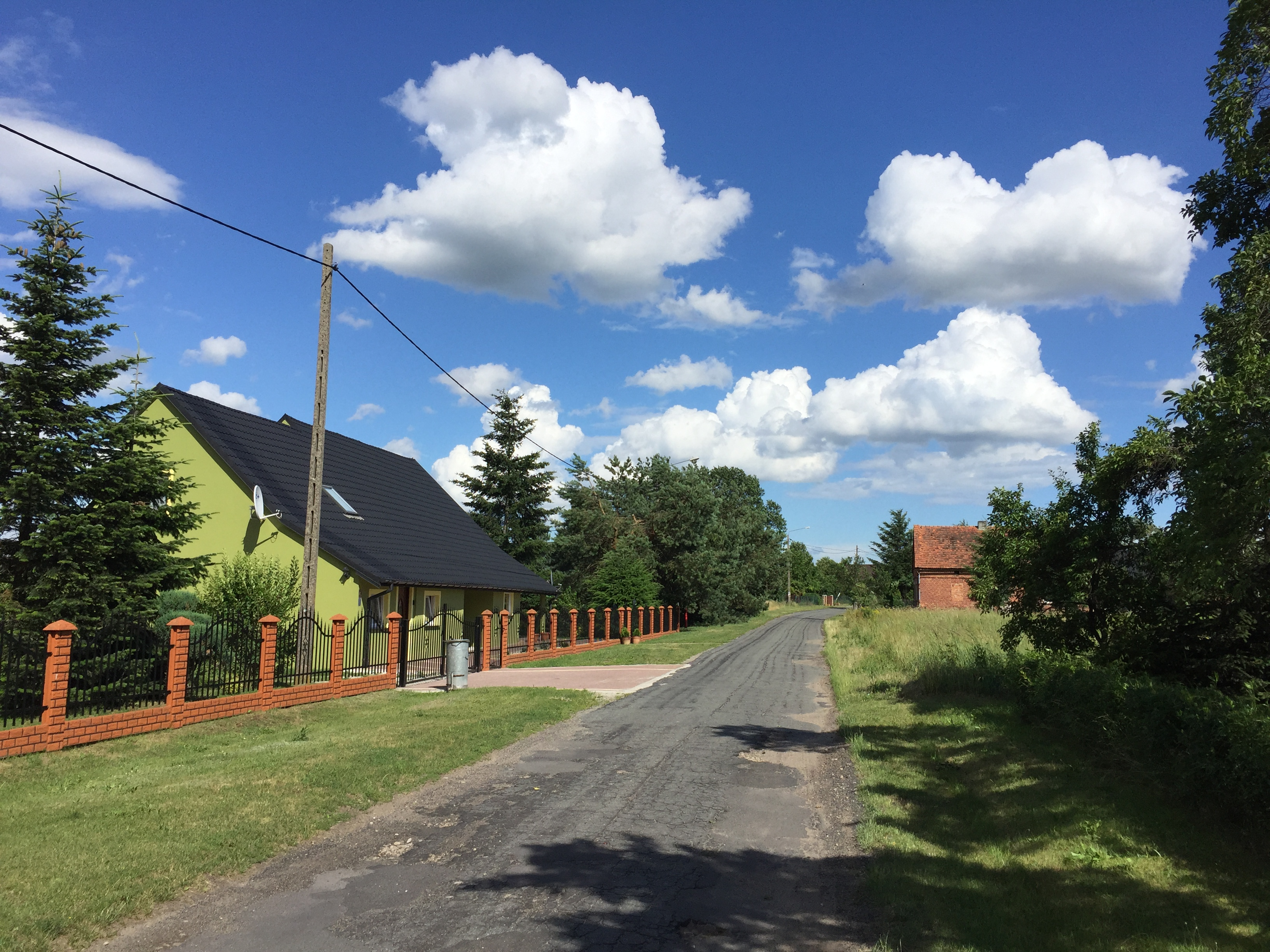
- Road in Radzieszyn village.

- Location within Poland
- Coordinates: 51°03′24″N 17°30′35″E
- Country: Poland
- Voivodeship: Lower Silesian
- County: Oleśnica
- Gmina: Bierutów

Radzieszyn [raˈd͡ʑɛʂɨn] is a village in the administrative district of Gmina Bierutów, within Oleśnica County, Lower Silesian Voivodeship, in south-western Poland.

Radzieszyn is known for its historic church, which was built in the 15th century and is dedicated to St. Nicholas. The church features a unique bell tower with a spire that is covered in glazed ceramic tiles.

Radzieszyn is located near several other attractions in the region, such as the ruins of the medieval Czersk Castle and the scenic Pilica River Valley.
