= Kijowice =

- Village
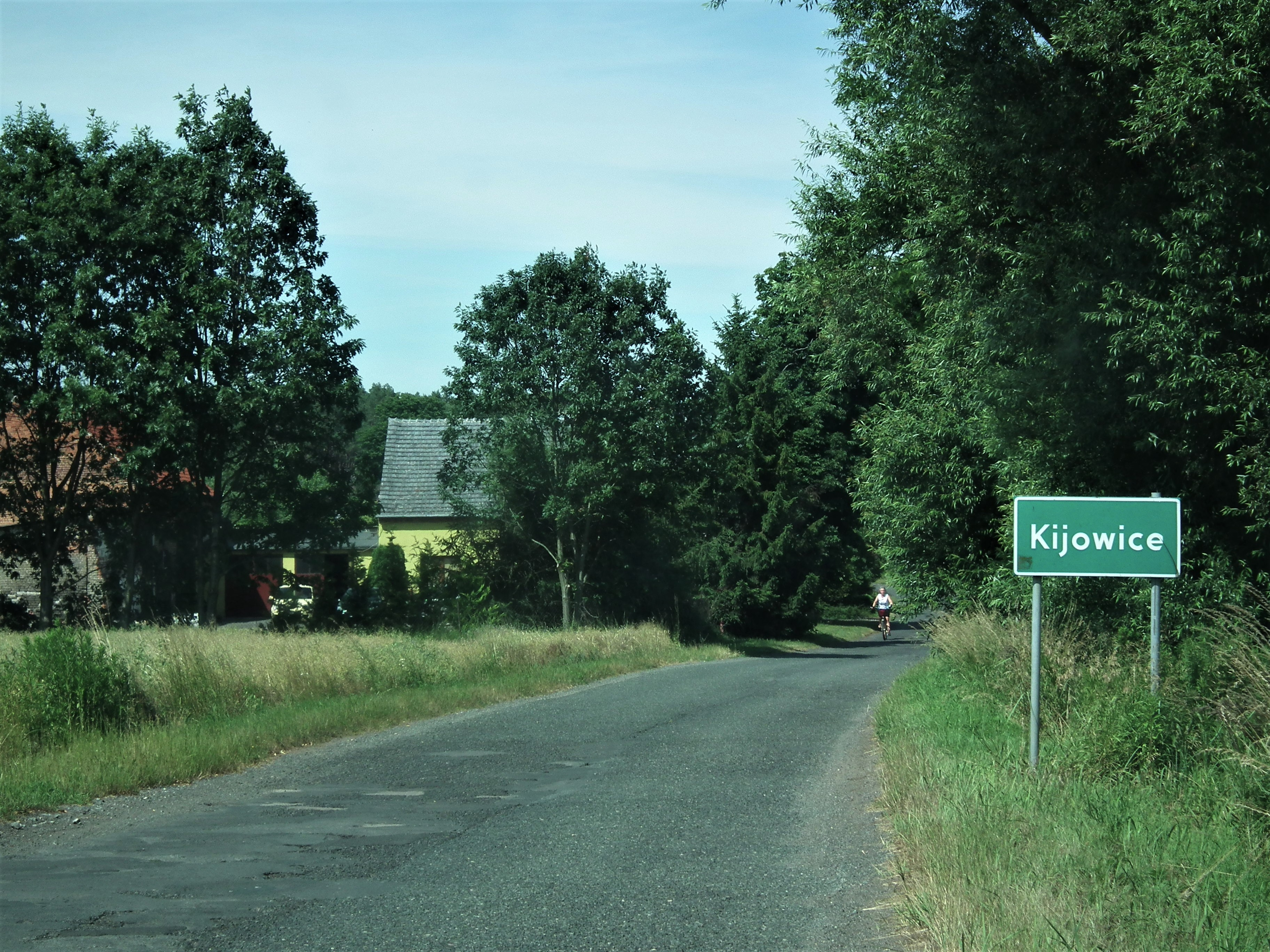

- Location within Poland
- Coordinates: 51°07′40″N 17°30′41″E
- Country: Poland
- Voivodeship: Lower Silesian
- County: Oleśnica
- Gmina: Bierutów

Kijowice [kijɔˈvit͡sɛ] is a village in the administrative district of Gmina Bierutów, within Oleśnica County, Lower Silesian Voivodeship, in south-western Poland.
