= Paul Kleinert =

German theologian

Paul Kleinert (23 September 1837 – 29 July 1920) was a German theologian, born at Vielguth in Prussian Silesia.

From 1854 to 1857 he studied at the universities of Breslau and Halle. He taught school in Oppeln and Berlin, becoming professor at the University of Berlin in 1868. In 1885-1886 he was rector at the University of Berlin. From 1873 to 1891 he was member (consistorial counsellor) of the Marcher Consistory in Berlin. In 1892 he was promoted upper consistorial counsellor in the Supreme Consistory (Evangelischer Oberkirchenrat; EOK) of the Evangelical State Church of Prussia's older Provinces.

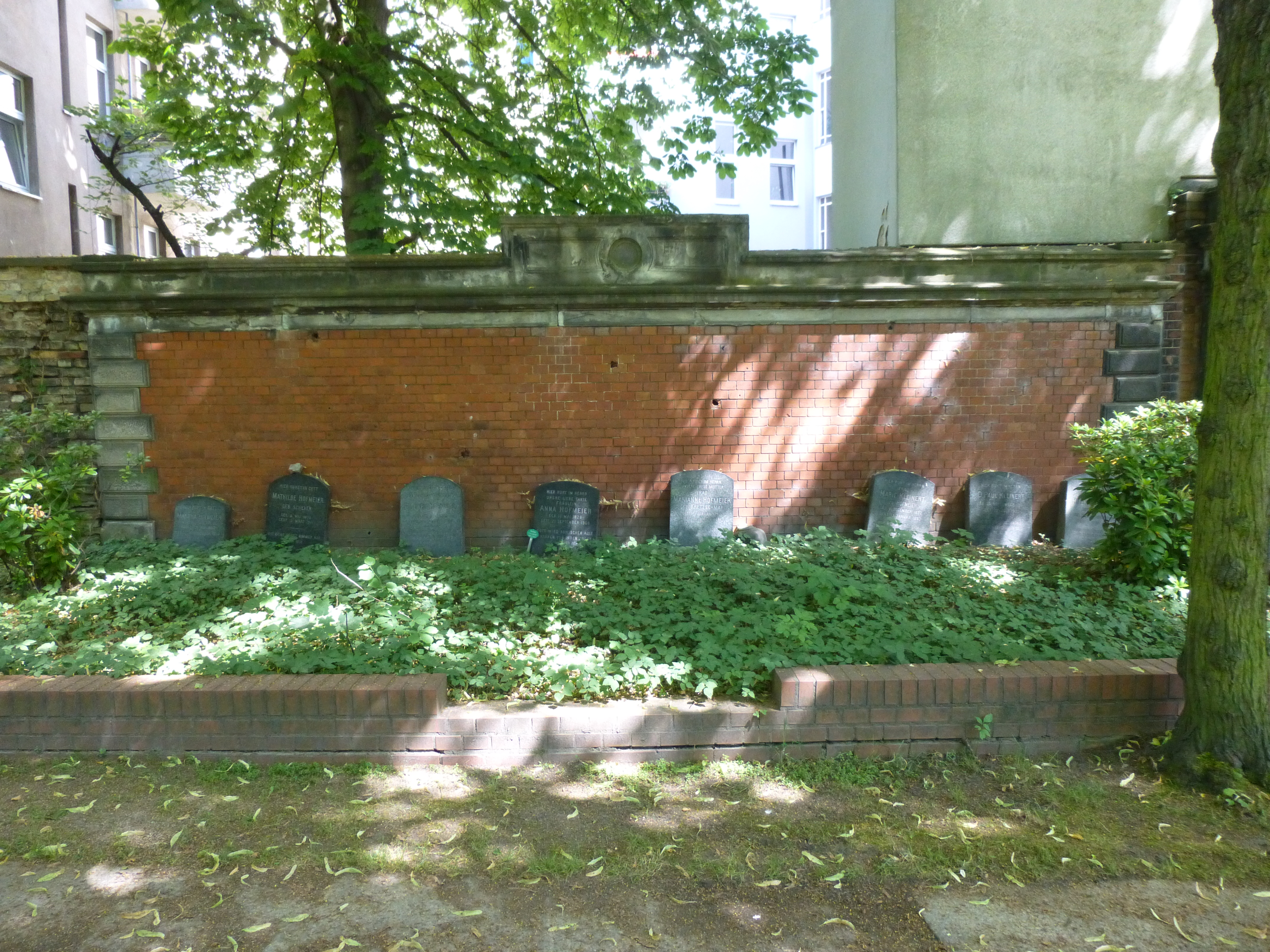
Family grave of Paul Kleinert, Alter St.-Matthäus-Kirchhof, Berlin

== Publications ==
Kleinert published:

- Obadjah-Zephanjah wissenschaftlich und für den Gebrauch der Kirche dargestellt (second edition, 1893)
- Ueber das Buch Koheleth (Berlin, 1864)
- Augustin und Goethes Faust (1866)
- Das Deuteronomium und die Deuteronomiker (1872)
- Untersuchungen zur alttestamentlichen Rechts- und Litteraturgeschichte (1872)
- Abriss der Einleitung zum alten Testament in Tabellenform (1878)
- Abhandlungen zur christlichen Kultus- und Kulturgeschichte (1889)
- Der preussische Agendenentwurf (1894)
- Selbstgespräche am Kranken- und Sterbelager (1896)
- Die Propheten Israels in sozialer Beziehung (1905)
- Homiletek (1907)
- Musik und Religion (1908)
