= Paczkowo =

Paczkowo may refer to the following places in Poland:

- Paczkowo, Greater Poland Voivodeship (west-central Poland)
- Paczkowo, Pomeranian Voivodeship (north Poland)
- Pączkowo, Masovian Voivodeship (east-central Poland)
