= Paczków, Lower Silesian Voivodeship =

Paczków
- Village
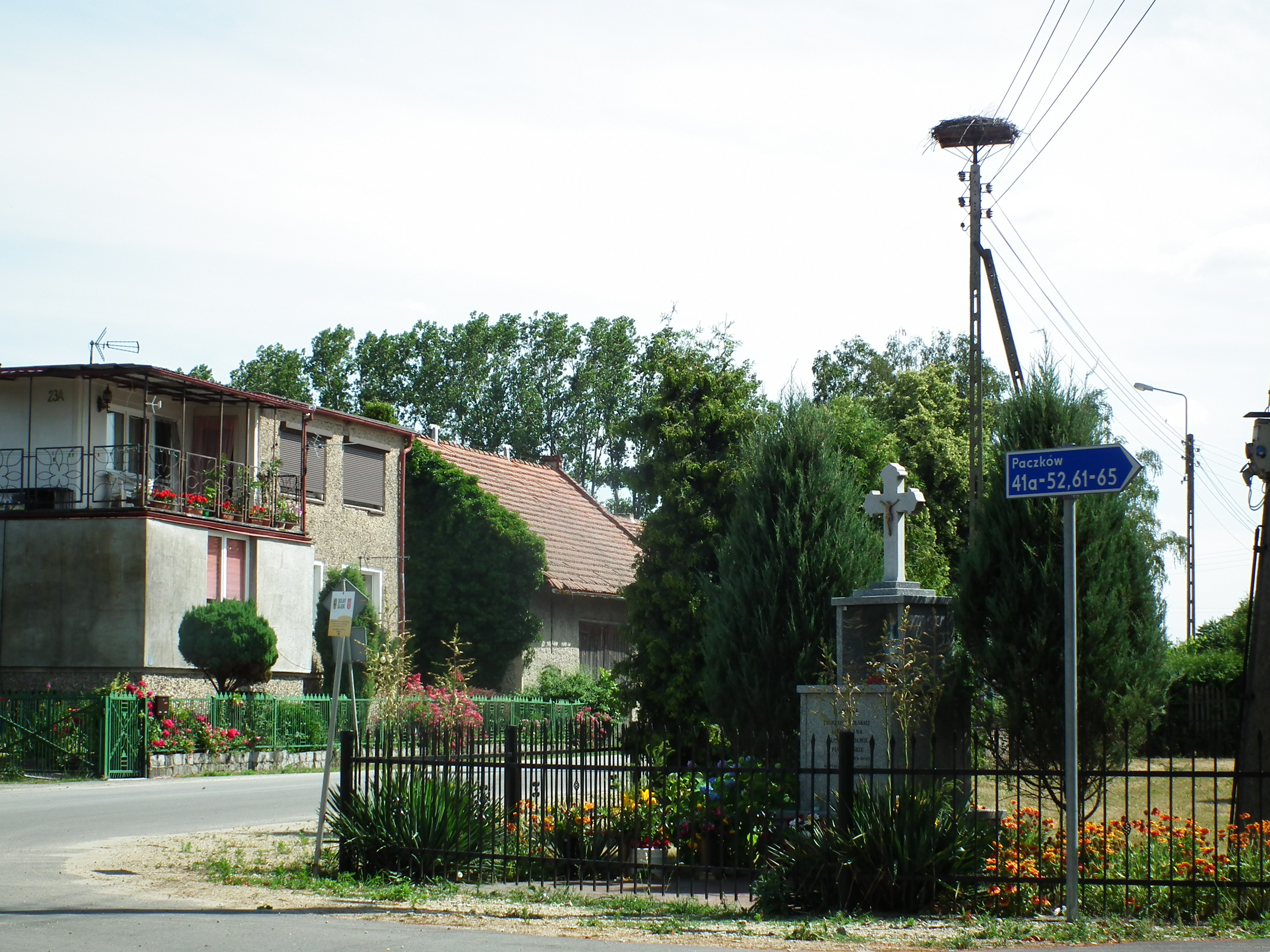

- Location within Poland
- Coordinates: 51°06′48″N 17°29′14″E
- Country: Poland
- Voivodeship: Lower Silesian
- County: Oleśnica
- Gmina: Bierutów

Paczków [ˈpat͡ʂkuf] is a village in the administrative district of Gmina Bierutów, within Oleśnica County, Lower Silesian Voivodeship, in south-western Poland.
