= Detlef Kleinert =

German lawyer and politician (1932–2016)

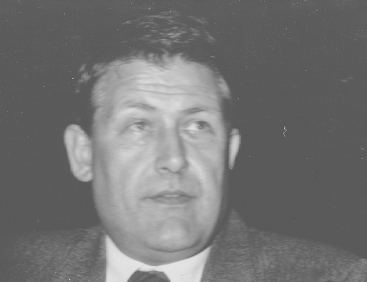
- Detlef Kleinert, 1984

Member of the Bundestag
- In office 20 October 1969 – 26 October 1998
- Constituency: Lower Saxony (1969–1998)

Chairman of the FDP district association Hanover-City
- In office 1967–1996

Personal details
- Born: 26 July 1932 Essen, Rhine Province, Germany
- Died: 17 June 2016 (aged 83) Hanover, Lower Saxony, Germany
- Party: Free Democratic Party
- Education: University of Erlangen; Ludwig-Maximilians-Universität München
- Occupation: Lawyer, notary, politician

Detlef Kleinert (26 July 1932 – 17 June 2016) was a German lawyer and politician of the Free Democratic Party (FDP). He was a member of the Bundestag from 20 October 1969 to 26 October 1998, representing Lower Saxony via the FDP state list, and worked on legal policy. From 1967 to 1996, he chaired the FDP district association for the city of Hanover.

== Early life and education ==
Kleinert was born in Essen and grew up in Schöningen, near the inner German border, and in Hanover. His father, a trained merchant, was a senior official of the Reichsbank and last headed its branch in Schöningen. He passed his Abitur in Schöningen in 1951 and studied law at the University of Erlangen and the Ludwig-Maximilians-Universität München. He took the first state law examination in 1955 and the second in 1960. In Munich, he joined a student corps. In 1952, he became a member of the Liberal Student Federation of Germany (Liberaler Studentenbund Deutschlands, LSD).

== Legal and business career ==
Kleinert began practising as a lawyer in Hanover in 1960 and later worked as a notary. During his time in parliament he was a board member of Wert-Garantie Technische Versicherung AG, an insurance company in Hanover. He was honorary chairman of the Vereinigung Liberaler Juristen (Association of Liberal Lawyers).

Kurt Jodexnis, a Hanover insurance businessman and a long-standing business associate of Kleinert, held a 20 per cent share in the casino company of Bad Bentheim and Bad Zwischenahn, which received its licence in 1975 from the FDP state interior minister Rötger Groß. In 1982, Jodexnis transferred half of this share to Kleinert. In August 1988, Kleinert testified about the stake before the Landtag of Lower Saxony's casino inquiry committee. He stated that he had received the share, with a nominal value of 300,000 Deutsche Mark, free of charge as compensation for a business deal with Jodexnis twelve years earlier. He also stated that he had only advised Jodexnis on the selection of the other partners, had never discussed the licence with Groß and had not donated any casino income to the party. Jodexnis largely confirmed his account.

== Political career ==
=== Party offices ===
Kleinert joined the FDP in 1957. From 1967 to 1996, he was chairman of the party's district association for the city of Hanover. In 1970, he became treasurer of the Lower Saxony FDP, a post he still held in 1988; during this time he consolidated the state party's finances. He took part in the FDP's 1974 coalition negotiations with the Social Democrats in Lower Saxony, whose delegation was led by Alfred Kubel. In November 1976, he was elected to the party's federal executive.

=== Member of the Bundestag ===
Kleinert was elected to the Bundestag in the 1969 federal election on the FDP's state list for Lower Saxony and was re-elected at each subsequent election until 1994. He sat from 20 October 1969 to 26 October 1998, from the 6th to the 13th legislative term.

From the end of 1969 he chaired the FDP parliamentary group's Working Group IV, which covered home affairs and law and, at times, education and the environment. His work there included data protection, bureaucracy and the volume of legislation. In his last term he was a full member of the Legal Affairs Committee, the Judicial Selection Committee and the committee that elects judges of the Federal Constitutional Court, and a deputy member of the Committee on Internal Affairs. He supported the repeal of Paragraph 175, the criminal provision against homosexual acts between men, and took part in drafting the reform of divorce law.

In July 1979, the Bundestag debated the abolition of the statute of limitations for murder, prompted by the approaching expiry of the limitation period for Nazi-era murders. Kleinert spoke for the majority of the FDP parliamentary group in favour of retaining the existing law. He argued that criminal justice should be kept separate from the country's responsibility for its history, that few unidentified perpetrators remained, and that the Majdanek trial had shown that fair trials were no longer possible after so long a period.

In May 1989, in a Bundestag debate on the conviction of the Memmingen gynaecologist Horst Theissen for illegal abortions, Kleinert criticised the conduct of the trial and described the women concerned as more victims than offenders.

On 23 November 1994, in the debate on Chancellor Helmut Kohl's government statement, Kleinert gave a short speech on legal and home-affairs policy while under the influence of alcohol. He spoke on whether electronic surveillance of private homes should be permitted, a question on which the FDP had not yet reached a decision, and his remarks drew repeated laughter from the opposition benches.

During the dispute over the German orthography reform of 1996, Kleinert, Norbert Geis and other members tabled a motion on German spelling, which the Bundestag debated on 18 April 1997.

In January 1998, Kleinert was one of the Legal Affairs Committee's rapporteurs on the amendment to Article 13 of the Basic Law that permitted electronic surveillance of private homes for criminal prosecution, and he took part in the cross-party negotiations on it for the FDP. In the Bundestag debate on 16 January 1998, he supported the amendment. He argued that its safeguards, including authorisation by a panel of judges, would limit surveillance to a small number of serious cases, and that the offices of lawyers and other professionals bound by confidentiality could not be fully exempted from surveillance.

=== Political positions ===
Kleinert belonged to the right wing of the FDP and was critical of the party's left-leaning currents. In 1995, the party's conservative wing, centred on Kleinert and the parliamentary group leader Hermann Otto Solms, was in conflict with the civil-liberties wing of the party and with the Federal Minister of Justice, Sabine Leutheusser-Schnarrenberger, who opposed electronic surveillance of private homes and supported dual citizenship. He also received negative press coverage over a dispute in a pub.

== Personal life and death ==
Kleinert had one child. He died in Hanover on 17 June 2016 at the age of 83.
