= Claudia Kleinert =

German television host

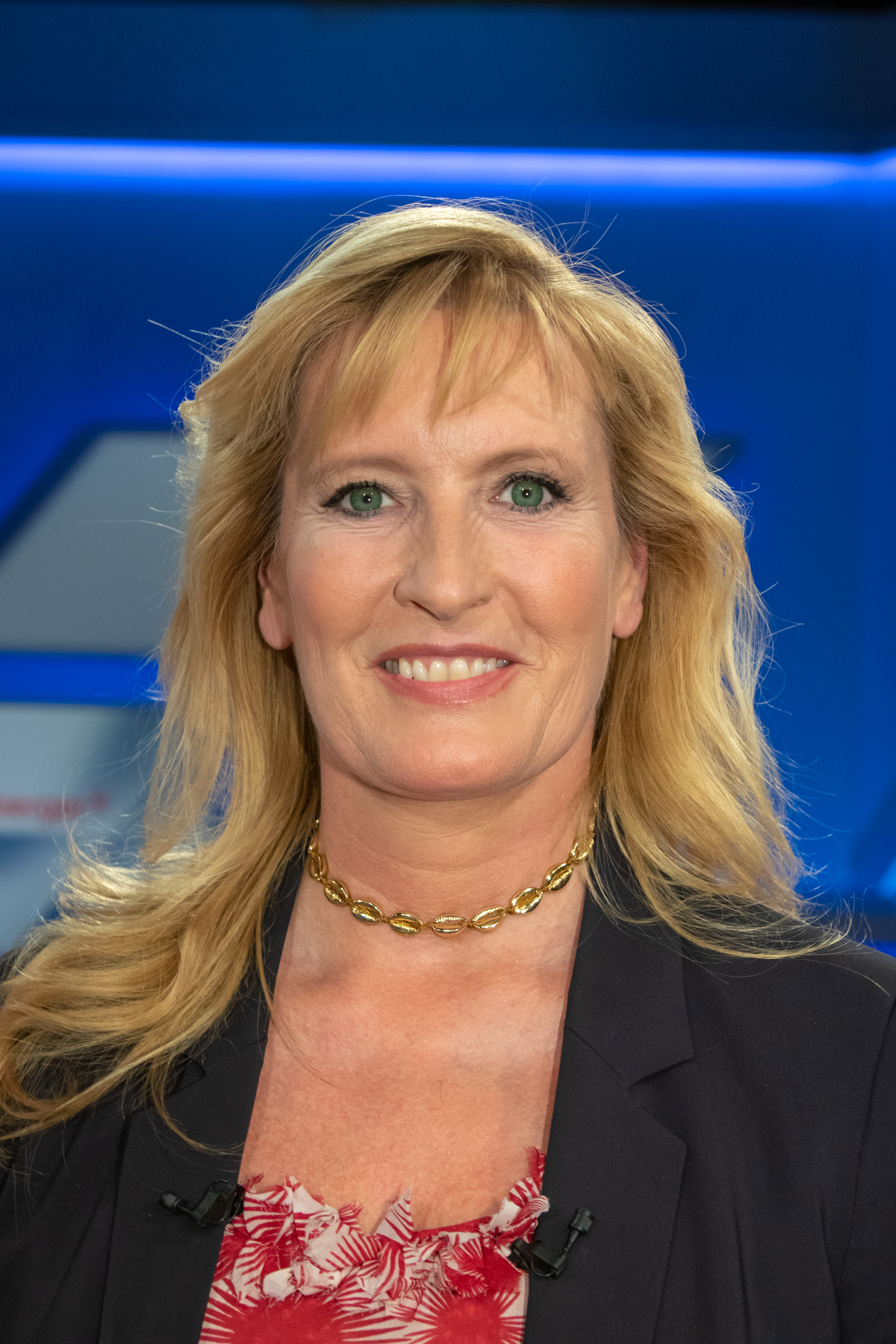
Claudia Kleinert in 2019

Claudia Kleinert (born December 31, 1969, in Koblenz) is a German television host.

== Life and career ==
Kleinert is the daughter of a professional soldier and a saleswoman; she has one brother. Born in Koblenz, she lived with her family in Cologne from early childhood, where she attended the Irmgardis-Gymnasium - an all-girls school until 1983. She took speech and acting lessons while still at school.

After graduating from high school in 1988, Kleinert began training as a Bankkauffrau and then worked for some time at Deutsche Bank in Cologne. In 1993, she began studying Business Administration at the University of Cologne, at the same time she worked for Westdeutscher Rundfunk and did Program announcements, among other things. In addition, she completed her studies in 1998 as a Diplom-Kauffrau.

As early as 1996, Kleinert moved to Wetterkanal in Düsseldorf, then presented the weather show and the travel magazine for the Cologne station n-tv and from 1999 also Das Wetter im Ersten on Das Erste and some dritten programs. She also moderates numerous events at trade fairs and presentations. At the end of the 1990s, she was recruited by Jörg Kachelmann to his company Meteomedia, where she rose to become a member of the management board. From 2002, she gave up her management role in favor of the weather announcements before the Tagesschau and after the Tagesthemen. Since the spring of 2002, she has alternated with Sven Plöger, Donald Bäcker and Karsten Schwanke in presenting the weather.

From March to December 2007, Kleinert presented the cooking program Kleinert kulinarisch on WDR Fernsehen.

On July 24, 2010, ARD broadcast a film (by Holger Weinert, Hessischer Rundfunk) about Claudia Kleinert as part of the series Höchstpersönlich.

== Personal ==
Until 2012, Kleinert had a residence in Gais near St. Gallen in Switzerland, since then she has lived in Cologne and Munich.

Kleinert has been involved with Kindernothilfe North Rhine-Westphalia. She has also been an ambassador for Lebenshilfe Nordrhein-Westfalen e. V. since 2008 and an ambassador for the children's rights organization Save the Children since 2021. She is the godmother of an Ethiopian child. As Kleinert mentioned in a television interview on NDR, she has a soft spot for vintage cars and owns a 1971 Mercedes-Benz 350 SL. She is in a relationship with the photographer and film producer Michael Souvignier.

On March 7, 2023, she was awarded the Order of Merit of the State of North Rhine-Westphalia.
