= Sątok =

- Village
- Location within Poland
- Coordinates: 51°4′N 17°27′E
- Country: Poland
- Voivodeship: Lower Silesian
- County: Oleśnica
- Gmina: Bierutów

Sątok [ˈsɔntɔk], not to be confused with Santok, is a village in the administrative district of Gmina Bierutów, within Oleśnica County, Lower Silesian Voivodeship, in south-western Poland.
