= Marcin Kasprzak =

Polish Marxist revolutionary

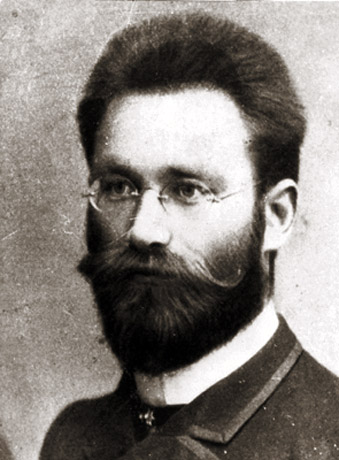
- Born: 2 November 1860; Schmiedsruh, Kreis Schrimm, Province of Posen, German Empire
- Died: 8 December 1905 (aged 45); Warsaw Citadel, Warsaw Governorate, Congress Poland
- Cause of death: Execution
- Other names: Maciej and Teofil
- Occupation: Roofer
- Years active: 1880-1904
- Political party: SDKPiL
- Other political affiliations: SAP; First Proletariat; Second Proletariat; Polish Socialist Party in Prussia
- Movement: Socialism
- Criminal penalty: Death by hanging
- Spouse: Helena Żółtowska
- Parents: Kacper (father); Agnieszka née Ostrowska (mother)

Marcin Kasprzak (November 2, 1860 – December 8, 1905) was a Polish Marxist revolutionary and a prominent leader of Poland's labour movement. He was a member of the Socialist Workers' Party of Germany (SAP), the International Social Revolutionary Party "Proletariat" (usually referred to by the names First Proletariat or Great Proletariat party), the Polish Socialist Party in Prussia, and the Social Democracy of the Kingdom of Poland and Lithuania (SDKPiL) party, and was a founder of the Social Revolutionary Party "Proletariat" (usually referred to by the names Second Proletariat or Small Proletariat party).

== Biography ==
Kasprzak was born the son of a laborer on November 2, 1860, in the village of Schmiedsruh, Kreis Schrimm. In 1885 he moved to Berlin and joined the SAP. He soon returned to his homeland, where he joined the First Proletariat.

Kasprzak was arrested in 1885, but escaped prison in 1887 and fled to Switzerland, then illegally arrived in Warsaw the same year. After the destruction of the First Proletariat in 1888, Kasprzak became one of the founders and leaders of the Second Proletariat. According to some sources, in 1889 Kasprzak also helped to smuggle Róża Luksemburg out of Congress Poland, from where she moved to Switzerland.

In 1891, Kasprzak fled to exile in London. In 1893, he was arrested while trying to cross the border of the Russian Empire. Released from prison in 1896, he joined the Polish Socialist Party in Prussia.

In 1904, Kasprzak returned to the Russian-controlled Congress Poland and joined the SDKPiL party. On April 27, 1904, during a police raid on an underground printing press in Warsaw, Kasprzak participated in armed resistance, during which four policemen were killed and several others wounded.

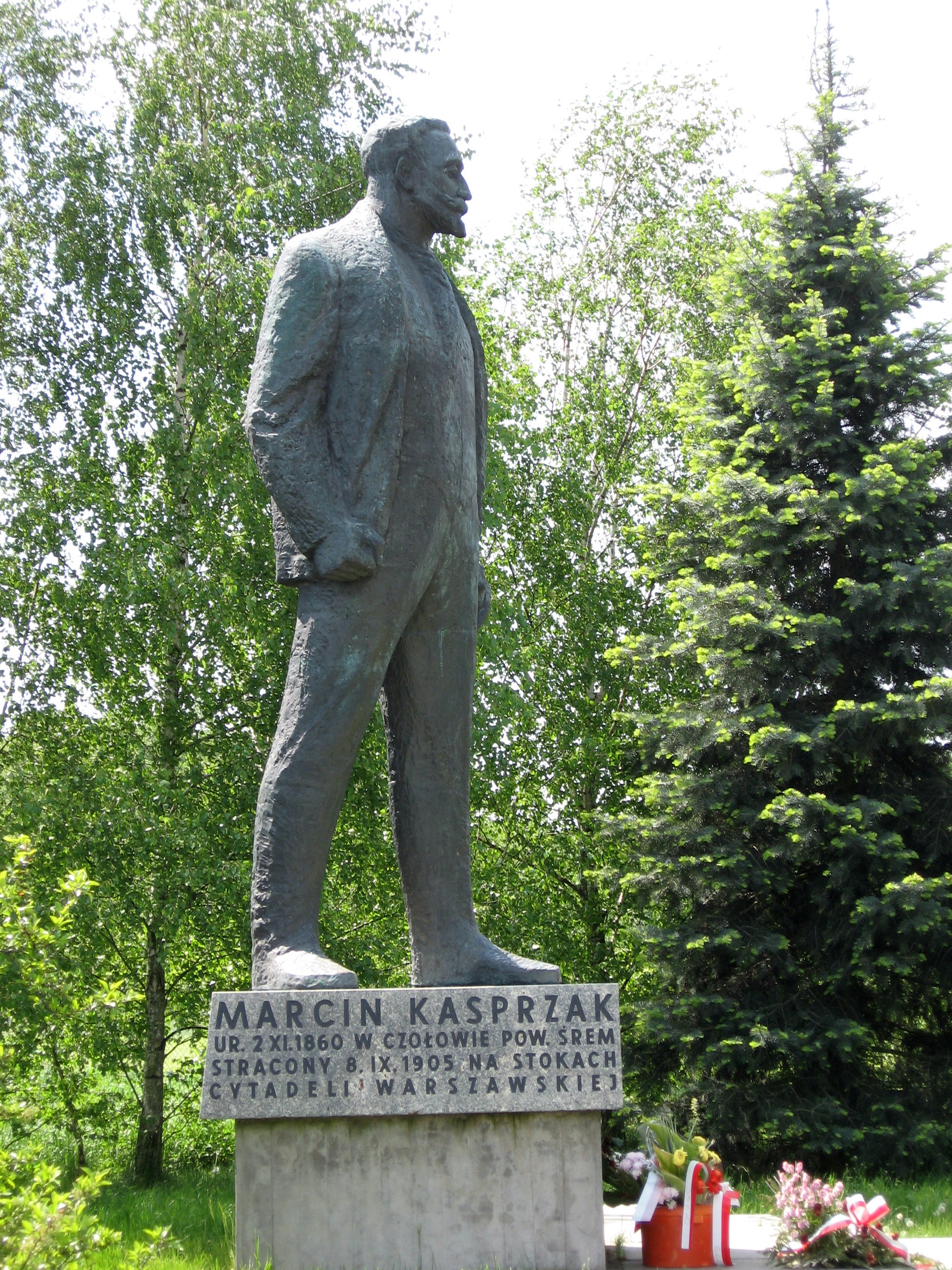
Monument to Kasprzak in his native village

Kasprzak was executed on 8 September 1905, in the Warsaw Citadel.

== See also ==
- Marcin Kasprzak Monument
