= Kreis Samter =

Coordinates: 52°37′00″N 16°35′00″E

Location of Kreis Samter

Kreis Samter (Polish: Powiat szamotulski) was a district in Regierungsbezirk Posen, in the Prussian Province of Posen from 1818 to 1918. Its territory presently lies in the north-western part of Polish region of Greater Poland Voivodeship.

== History ==
The Samter district was formed on 1 January 1818, with its capital at Samter. As part of the Province of Posen, the Samter district became part of the newly founded German Empire on 18 January 1871.

On 27 December 1918 the Greater Poland uprising began in the province of Posen, and on the same day the district town of Samter came under Polish control. On 16 February 1919 an armistice ended the Polish-German fighting, and on 28 June 1919 the German government officially ceded the Samter district to the newly founded Poland with the signing of the Treaty of Versailles.

== Elections ==
In the German Empire, the district of Samter, together with the districts of Birnbaum, Obornik and Schwerin belonged to the Posen 2 Reichstag constituency. The constituency was won by the following candidates in the Reichstag elections:

- 1871: Ludwig von Rönne, National Liberal Party
- 1874: Ludwig Zietkiewicz, Polish Party
- 1877: Stephan von Kwilecki, Polish Party
- 1878: Stephan von Kwilecki, Polish Party
- 1881: Stephan von Kwilecki, Polish Party
- 1884: Stephan von Kwilecki, Polish Party
- 1887: Hector von Kwilecki, Polish Party
- 1890: Hector von Kwilecki, Polish Party
- 1893: Hector von Kwilecki, Polish Party
- 1898: Hector von Kwilecki, Polish Party
- 1903: Mathias von Brudzewo-Mielzynski, Polish Party
- 1907: Mathias von Brudzewo-Mielzynski, Polish Party (52.3% of the vote)
- 1912: Mathias von Brudzewo-Mielzynski, Polish Party (52.7% of the vote)

== Demographics ==
The district had a majority Polish population, with a significant German minority.

Ethnic structure of the Samter district
	1831		1860	
German	10,823	32.2%	16,695	37.1%
Polish	22,760	67.8%	28,312	62.9%
Total	33,583		45,007	

== Towns ==
The five towns in the district were Obersitzko, Pinne, Samter, Scharfenort and Wronke.
