= Province of Posen =

Province of Prussia (1848–1920)

Province of Posen Provinz Posen (German) Prowincja Poznańska (Polish)
- A province of Prussia
- 1848–1920
- Flag Coat of arms

- Posen (red) within Prussia (blue) within the German Empire
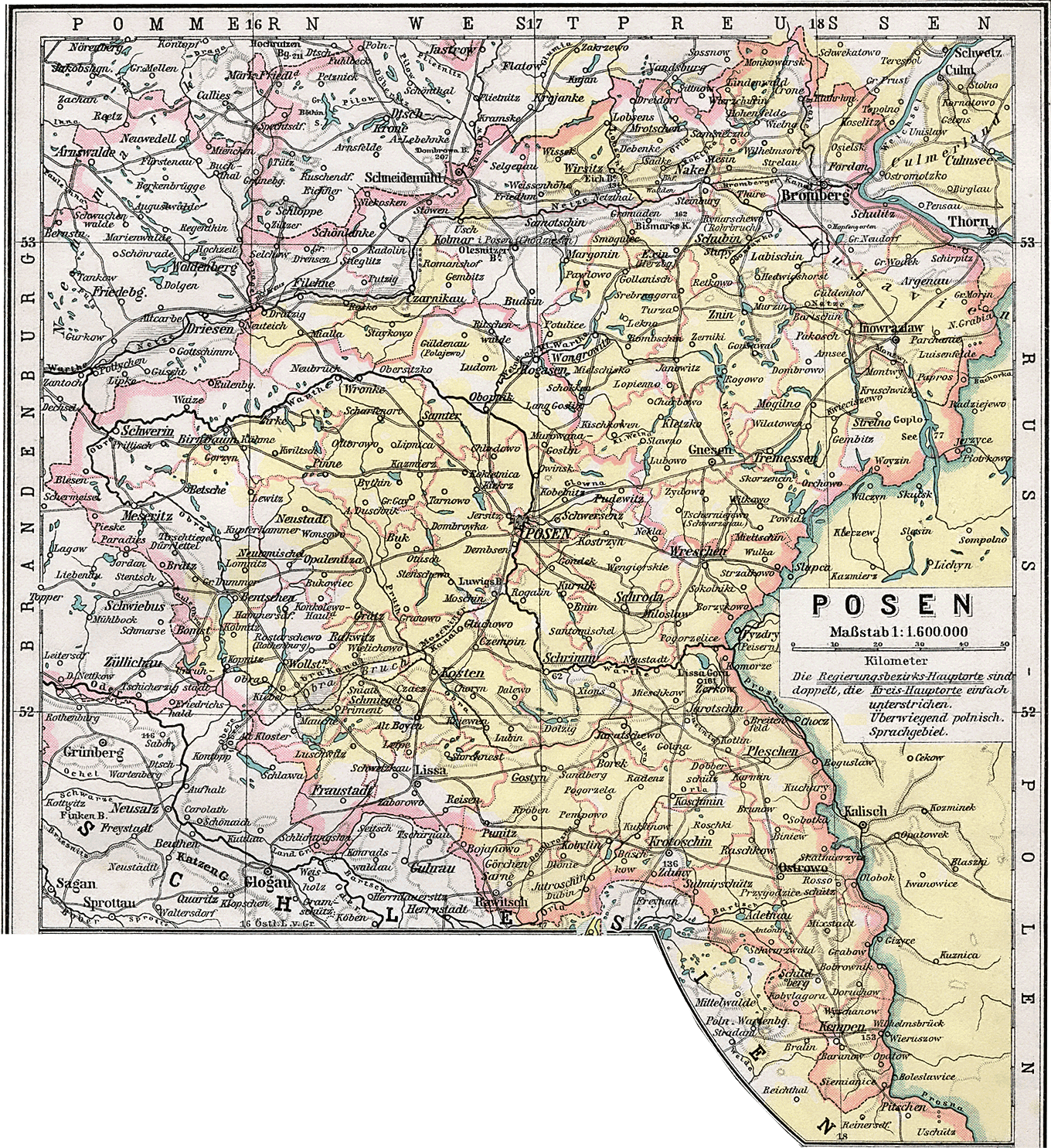
- Capital: Poznań
- Area
  - Coordinates: 52°24′N 16°55′E
  - 1910: 28,962 km^{2} (11,182 sq mi)
- Population
  - 1910: 2,099,831
- Lesser coat of arms
- History
  - Established: 1848
  - Disestablished: 1920
- Political subdivisions: Posen; Bromberg
Preceded by	Succeeded by
Grand Duchy of Posen	Posen–West Prussia; Poznań Voivodeship (1919–1939)
- Today part of: Poland

The Province of Posen (German: Provinz Posen; Polish: Prowincja Poznańska) was a province of the Kingdom of Prussia from 1848 to 1920. It comprised most of the historical region of Greater Poland, which is currently in the west-central part of Poland. Its capital was the city of Posen (present-day Poznań).

Prussia acquired the territory that became the Province of Posen in the 1772 and 1793 partitions of Poland. During the Napoleonic Wars, the region was briefly a client state of France before it was returned to Prussia as the Grand Duchy of Posen in 1815. Following the failed Greater Poland Uprising of 1848, it was reorganised into the Province of Posen and went on to be incorporated, still as a province of the Kingdom of Prussia, into the North German Confederation in 1866 and the German Empire in 1871. Following World War I, the Treaty of Versailles awarded all but two small areas in the far west of the province to the Second Polish Republic in 1920. The territory that remained with Germany was combined in 1922 with the remnants of the Province of West Prussia to form the Prussian province of Posen-West Prussia within the Weimar Republic. As a result of Germany's defeat in World War II, all of what had been the Province of Posen came within the Soviet-dominated Polish People's Republic in 1947. It is today part of the Third Polish Republic.

Posen was always a majority-Polish province, with roughly 60 to 70 percent of its inhabitants Polish speakers. It was affected by three uprisings for an independent Polish state between 1846 and 1919. The Prussian government responded with a series of Germanisation measures including the anti-Catholic Kulturkampf, laws to enforce the use of German in schools and government offices, and programs to attract German settlers to the area. The efforts were in the end unsuccessful and had the effect of heightening the Poles' sense of a national identity.

== Geography ==
Physical map of Posen in 1910

The land is mostly flat, drained by two major watershed systems, the Noteć (German: Netze) in the north and the Warta (Warthe) in the centre. Glaciers left moraine deposits, and the land is speckled with hundreds of "finger lakes", streams flowing in and out on their way to one of the two rivers.

Agriculture was the primary industry. The three-field system was used to grow a variety of crops, primarily rye, other grains, sugar beets, potatoes, and some tobacco and hops. Significant parcels of wooded land provided building materials and firewood. There was some livestock, notably a fair number of sheep.

== History ==
=== Grand Duchy of Posen ===
Greater Poland – the region of west-central Poland (Polish Wielkopolska) whose largest city was Posen (Polish Poznań) – became part of the Kingdom of Prussia during the First and Second Partitions of Poland in 1772 (the Netze District) and 1793 (South Prussia). After Prussia's defeat in the Napoleonic Wars, the territory became part of the Duchy of Warsaw, a client state of France, under the terms of the 1807 Franco-Prussian Treaties of Tilsit. The 1815 Congress of Vienna, which re-ordered Europe following Napoleon's downfall, restored the western part of the duchy to Prussia, with the remainder going to the Russian Empire. Prussia initially administered the region as the semi-autonomous Grand Duchy of Posen. It had its own parliament, although in an advisory capacity only, Polish was the official language in all state functions including education, and Antoni Radziwiłł was appointed to the special position of viceroy (Statthalter) to be a liaison between the central government and the Polish gentry. After the failed anti-Russian November Uprising of 1830 in Congress Poland, the Grand Duchy was stripped of much of its special status. Under Eduard Heinrich von Flottwell, who as Oberpräsident replaced the Statthalter position in December 1830, Prussia's Germanisation measures increased with such policies as inviting German settlers and extending the use of German in education.

=== Greater Poland uprisings and establishment of the province ===
A first Greater Poland Uprising against Prussian rule in 1846 failed when its leaders were reported to the Prussian police and arrested. The Prussian authorities declared martial law in Posen, and some 600 additional arrests were made. Despite Prussia's mistrust of the Polish nobility, relatively few of them were involved in planning the abortive uprising. The independent peasants of the region for the most part also remained at a distance.

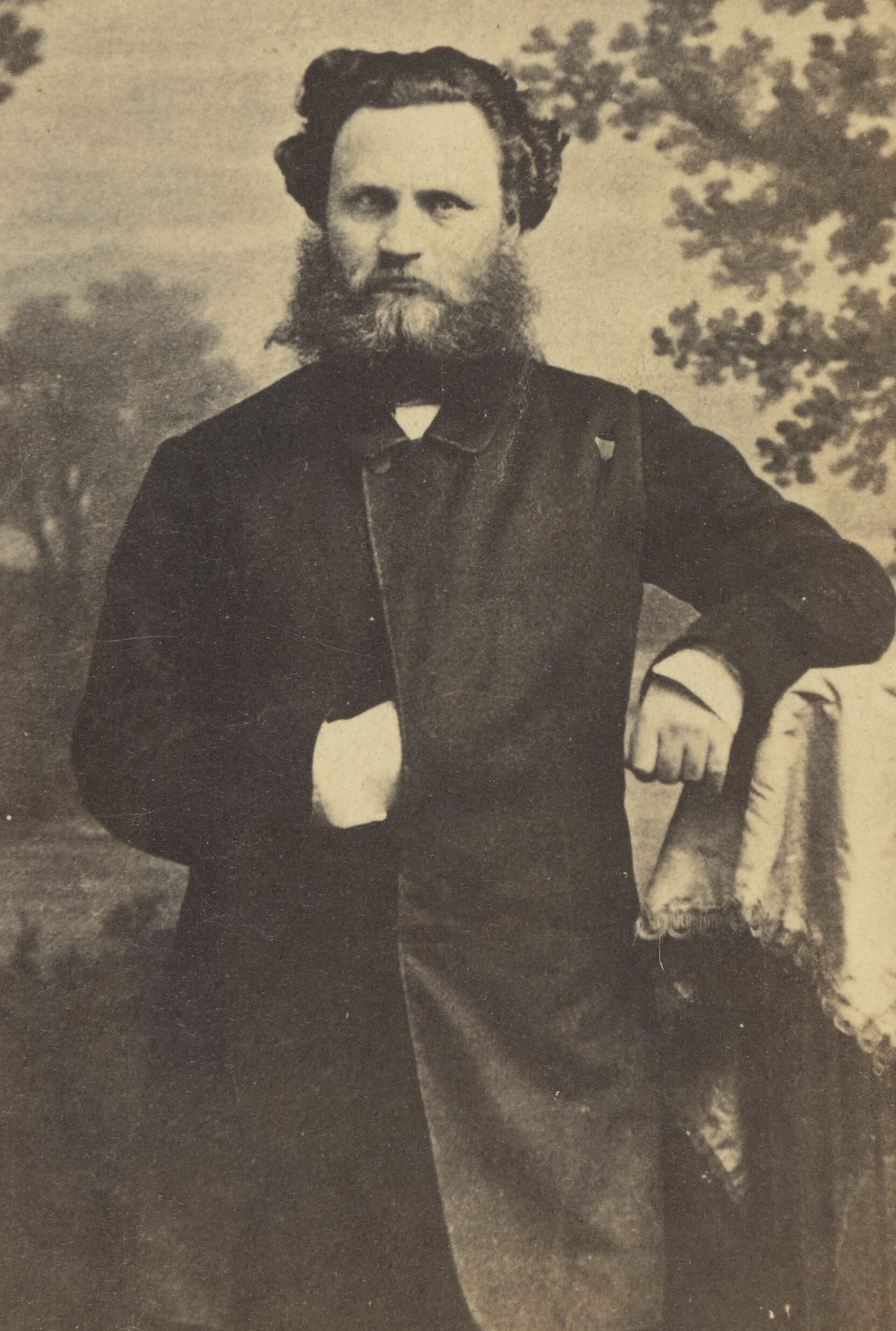
Ludwik Mierosławski, a leader in the first two Greater Poland uprisings

The second Greater Poland Uprising was sparked by the German revolution of 1848–1849, an attempt to unify and liberalise the German states that made up the loosely knit German Confederation. On 20 March 1848, Ludwik Mierosławski and other participants of the 1846 rebellion were freed from prison in Berlin, and a Polish National Committee was formed in Posen. When the assembly of representatives from across the German Confederation that was meeting at Frankfurt voted to include Posen in the elections for a German National Assembly, Poles in Greater Poland under Mieroslawski's leadership rose up against becoming part of Germany. They wanted a restored Poland that would include the parts held by both Russia and Prussia. The friendly mood towards Poles among German revolutionaries quickly soured with the outbreak of the uprising. The Frankfurt Parliament voted 341 to 31 to bring it into the German Confederation and thus make it part of a new Germany.

In order to quell the disturbances in Greater Poland, King Frederick William IV of Prussia issued a cabinet order on 26 April 1848 that divided the Grand Duchy into a Province of Posen in the west, which would join the German Confederation, and an eastern part that was promised its own constitutional government. When the insurrection continued unabated, Prussia sent in troops and defeated the Poles. All of the former Grand Duchy of Posen subsequently became the Province of Posen. Prussia's kings nevertheless retained the title "Grand Duke of Posen" until the fall of the German and Prussian monarchies in 1918. The 1848 revolution overall failed to reach its goals, and the situation in the German Confederation remained largely unchanged. Posen belonged to the Kingdom of Prussia but was outside the Confederation.

Frederick William granted the Kingdom of Prussia a constitution in 1848. It gave the Poles no special status, which meant that they had the same civil liberties as all other Prussians, including the right to send members to the Prussian parliament, the Landtag in Berlin. Polish districts in Posen elected Polish-speaking Catholics who formed an opposition group in the Landtag. It was a small caucus and frequently sided with opposition parties.

In 1866, following Prussia's victory in the Austro-Prussian War, the German Confederation was dissolved, and Posen became part of the Prussian-led North German Confederation. Posen's Polish delegates to the Landtag protested in vain that they had a right to an autonomous administration and did not want to be part of the new confederation. During its short life (1866–1871), the North German Confederation did not push Germanisation in Posen because Prussia believed that German settlement would take place of itself. Chancellor Otto von Bismarck also wanted to maintain good relations with the Catholics in Posen as he eyed the possibility of bringing the southern German states with their large Catholic populations into a united Germany.

=== German Empire ===
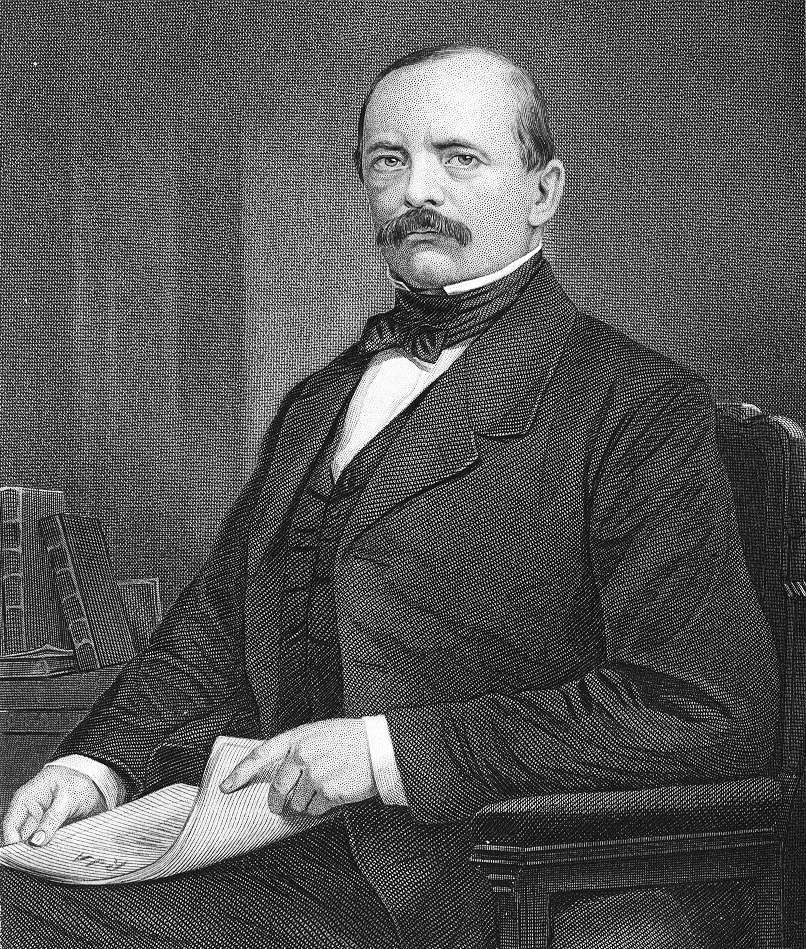
Otto von Bismarck in 1873. His Kulturkampf against Catholics antagonised Posen's Poles.

During the Franco-Prussian War (1870–1871), which led to Germany's unification, the level of pro-French partisanship in Posen alarmed Prussian officials, and Bismarck spoke out forcefully against it in the cabinet. Following the formal establishment of the German Empire, Polish representatives in the Reichstag protested Posen's incorporation in much the same terms that they had used in the Prussian Landtag in 1867. Bismarck feared that a large Polish minority that was seeking independence could endanger the Empire and classified Poles as enemies of the Reich (Reichsfeinde) along with socialists. His hostility towards the Poles was already well known. In 1861 he had written in a letter to his sister: "Hit the Poles so hard that they despair of their life; I have full sympathy for their condition, but if we want to survive we can only exterminate them." His dislike was firmly entrenched in Prussian traditions, and most Prussians, including the King, agreed with his views.

Prussian responses to the Poles in its eastern provinces were primarily in three areas: religion, language and settlement policy. Bismarck fired the first salvo of his nationwide anti-Catholic Kulturkampf (1871–1878) in Posen in 1872 by taking inspection of Catholic schools out of the hands of the clergy. When priests rebelled against the inspection and later Kulturkampf laws, Polish parishioners rallied behind them. They did what they could to protect their clerics against arrest, refused to attend services led by German-speaking replacements and in some cases even physically attacked them. It was the Kulturkampf that first brought Polish-speaking peasants into the Polish national movement.

The questions surrounding the use of the Polish language in schools and government offices lasted much longer than the Kulturkampf, which officially ended in 1878. Not long after the formation of the German Empire, Prussia implemented an ordinance that required that German be the language of school instruction "wherever possible" and that public meetings be shut down if any of the speeches were not in German. German was made the sole and official language for all government business in 1876. Over 25 years later, in 1902, a scandal erupted when it became public that children in Posen were being beaten for refusing to recite the Lord's Prayer in German. In 1906, 100,000 school children went on strike over the practice of whipping those who refused to answer questions in German. A petition by the archbishop of Posen requesting that religious instruction in Polish be allowed was rejected. Parents who then withdrew their children from the classes were fined or fired from their positions.

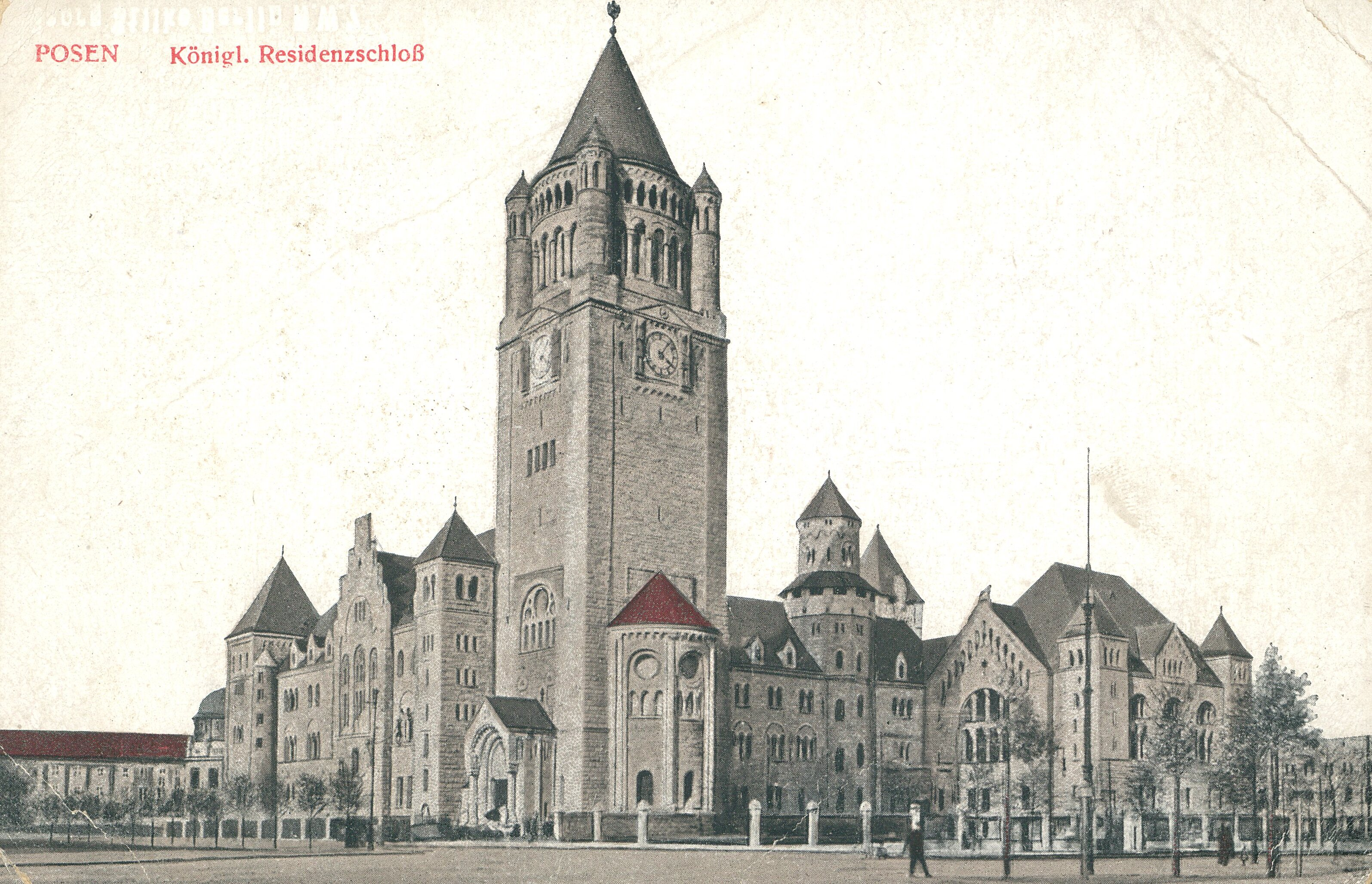
Emperor Wilhelm II's imperial residence in Posen in its original form

By the 1880s, the increasing flight of Germans from the agriculturally depressed east to the industrializing areas in the west prompted the Prussian Landtag to establish the Prussian Settlement Commission headquartered in the city of Posen. It was given 100 million marks to buy failing Polish estates, subdivide them and let the land out to German farmers. Another 100 million marks was allotted to the commission in 1898 and 250 million more in 1903, at which point a law also made it illegal for the German settlers to sell their land to Poles. In the first 15 years of the program, over 300 square miles of land in Posen were distributed. In 1905, Emperor Wilhelm II initiated the construction of an imperial residence in the city of Posen. When it was completed in 1910, Posen was designated an imperial residence city.

Ultimately, Polish resistance to the Kulturkampf and to the imposition of the German language in schools and the government, together with the unbroken tide of German flight to the west, made a failure of Prussia's attempts to suppress the striving for Polish independence in Posen and the other eastern provinces with a substantial Polish-speaking minority. Discrimination in all areas continued to some degree up to 1914, and during World War I Germanisation and annexation were carried out through military means. Poles in Posen nevertheless maintained their sense of a cultural and national identity throughout.

=== Dissolution after World War I ===
Division of the Province of Posen after World War I. The areas in orange and red remained in Germany, while the grey region became part of Poland. (Note: 'ehem.' = 'former')

Germany's defeat in World War I ushered in the end of the Province of Posen. A third Greater Poland uprising broke out on 27 December 1918, ignited by Polish pianist and patriot Ignacy Jan Paderewski's speech in the city of Posen the preceding day. The insurgents quickly took the city from the Germans and controlled most of the province in mid-January. By the time an armistice was signed between Germany and the Poles in Trier on 16 February 1919, an estimated 3,000 to 3,500 people had died in the fighting.

Under the terms of the Treaty of Versailles, which became effective on 10 January 1920, the territory captured during the uprising became part of the Polish Republic as the Poznań Voivodeship. The majority German-populated remainder (with Bomst, Fraustadt, Neu Bentschen, Meseritz, Tirschtiegel (partially), Schwerin, Blesen, Schönlanke, Filehne, Schloppe, Deutsch Krone, Tütz, Schneidemühl, Flatow, Jastrow, and Krojanke – about 2,200 km^{2} (850 sq mi)) was merged with the western remains of the former Province of West Prussia and administered as Posen–West Prussia with Schneidemühl as its capital.

The majority of German speakers in the region that had been ceded to Poland moved west into areas that still belonged to Prussia and Germany. Under Article 91 of the Treaty of Versailles, all German nationals who were resident in Posen before 1 January 1908 automatically became Polish citizens, although within two years of the treaty's effective date they could opt for German nationality. Many of those affected thought that the option was a referendum on whether their region should be part of Germany or Poland rather than a personal choice. The new Polish government's strict policy regarding minorities led to well over half of German speakers in the regions of Posen and West Prussia that had become part of Poland to emigrate.

Posen-West Prussia was dissolved in 1938 when its territory was split between the neighbouring Prussian provinces of Silesia, Pomerania and Brandenburg. In 1939, the territory of the former province of Posen was annexed by Nazi Germany and made part of Reichsgau Wartheland (initially Reichsgau Posen).

Following Germany's defeat in World War II, at the demand of the Soviet Union, all of the German territory east of the Oder–Neisse line defined under the Potsdam Agreement was turned over to either Poland or the Soviet Union. All historical parts of the Province of Posen came under Polish control, and the ethnic German population was forcibly expelled.

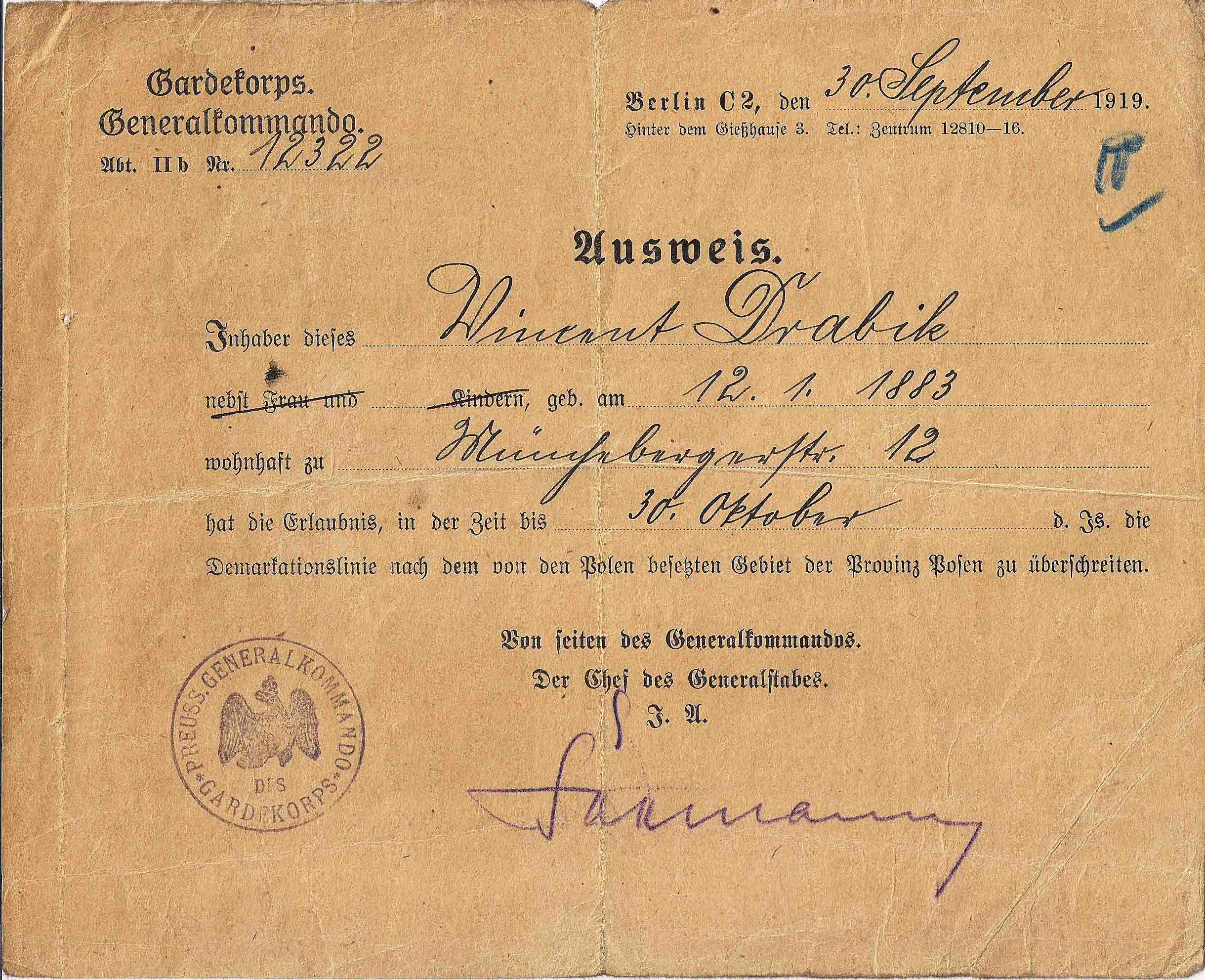
1919 German army permit to enter the Polish territory of Posen, which had just been ceded to Poland

Division of the province between Poland and Weimar Germany
Given to:	Area in 1910 (km^{2})	Share of territory	Population in 1910
	28,962		2,099,831
Poland (Poznań Voivodeship)	26,111	90%	93%
Germany (Posen-West Prussia) (Note: The western fringes of Prussian Greater Poland remained in Germany after 1918. The area included all of county Skwierzyna and portions of counties Wschowa, Babimost, Międzyrzecz, Chodzież, Wieleń and Czarnków (Netzekreis). It contained 12 towns: Piła, Skwierzyna, Bledzew, Wschowa, Szlichtyngowa, Babimost, Kargowa, Międzyrzecz, Zbąszyń, Brójce, Trzciel and Trzcianka. The area was home to significant Polish minority.)	2,851	10%	7%

== Religious and ethnic composition ==
Posen was inhabited by a Polish majority together with German and Jewish minorities and a smattering of other ethnic groups. Almost all the Poles were Roman Catholic, and most of the Germans were Protestant. The small number of Jews were primarily in the larger communities, mostly in skilled crafts, local commerce and regional trading. The smaller the community, the more likely it was to be either all Polish or all German. Such "pockets of ethnicity" existed side by side, with German villages concentrated in northern and western Posen. Under Prussia's Germanisation policies, the population became more German until the end of the 19th century, when the trend reversed as millions of Germans from the region migrated in the Ostflucht to more industrialised regions in central and western Germany.

Languages in the Province of Posen according to the Prussian census of 1910. Shading is from bright red (mostly German) to dark blue (mostly Polish).

Ethnolinguistic composition of the Province of Posen
Year	1815	1819	1837	1846	1890	1910
Total population	798,000	883,972	1,158,608	1,343,135	1,751,642	2,099,831
% Polish-speaking (including bilinguals)	73%	77.0%	65.3%	71.7%	60.1%	61.5% (or 65%) (Note: Official German figures from 1910 fix the percent of Polish-speaking residents at 61.5%. According to historian Stanislas Kozicki, "Authoritative Polish statisticians reckon that, out of 141,000 persons inscribed as 'German Catholics ' in the census of 1910, half may be considered Poles. In this case, the Polish population would form 65 per cent.")
% German-speaking (including most Jews)	25%	17.5%	28.3%	28.3%	39.9%	38.5% (or 35%)

== Statistics ==
Area: 28,962 km^{2}

Population

- 1816: 820,176
- 1868: 1,537,300
  - Bydgoszcz 550,900
  - Poznan 986,400
- 1871: 1,583,843
  - Catholics 1,009,885
  - Protestants 511,429
  - Jews 61,982
  - others 547
- 1875: 1,606,084
- 1880: 1,703,397
- 1900: 1,887,275
- 1905: 1,986,267
- 1910: 2,099,831
  - Bromberg – 763,947
  - Posen – 1,335,884

== Divisions ==
Prussian provinces were subdivided into government regions (Regierungsbezirke). Posen had two:

- Regierungsbezirk Posen 17,503 km^{2}
- Regierungsbezirk Bromberg 11,448 km^{2}

The governmental regions (Regierungsbezirke) Posen (pink) and Bromberg (green) with their subdivisions (Kreise)

The regions were subdivided into districts called Kreise. Cities had their own Stadtkreis (urban district) and the surrounding rural area was named for the city and referred to as a Landkreis (rural district). In the case of Posen, the Landkreis was split into two: Landkreis Posen West, and Landkreis Posen East.

Ethnic Structure of the Province of Posen (1910 census)
District	Name in Polish	Population	German	%	Polish	%	Bilingual	%
Province of Posen	-	2,099,831	806,720	38.4%	1,278,890	60.9%	11,899	0.6%
Bromberg Region	-	763,947	379,488	49.7%	378,831	49.6%	4,956	0.6%
City of Bromberg	Bydgoszcz	57,696	46,720	81.0%	9,350	16.2%	1,557	2.7%
Bromberg	Bydgoszcz	96,473	58,783	60.9%	37,049	38.4%	590	0.6%
Czarnikau	Czarnków	42,287	30,016	71.0%	12,027	28.4%	179	0.4%
Filehne	Wieleń	33,653	23,504	69.8%	9,918	29.5%	217	0.6%
Gnesen	Gniezno	56,250	21,461	38.2%	34,643	61.6%	129	0.2%
Hohensalza	Inowrocław	77,294	28,394	36.7%	48,599	62.9%	258	0.3%
Kolmar in Posen	Chodzież	76,020	61,600	81.0%	13,957	18.4%	427	0.6%
Mogilno	Mogilno	49,253	14,274	29.0%	34,659	70.4%	194	0.4%
Schubin	Szubin	48,304	21,035	43.5%	26,799	55.5%	403	0.8%
Strelno	Strzelno	37,620	7,437	19.8%	30,109	80.0%	67	0.2%
Wirsitz	Wyrzysk	67,219	34,235	50.9%	32,446	48.3%	495	0.7%
Witkowo	Witkowo	29,094	4,814	16.5%	24,164	83.1%	91	0.3%
Wongrowitz	Wągrowiec	52,574	16,309	31.0%	35,955	68.4%	216	0.4%
Znin	Żnin	40,210	10,906	27.1%	29,156	72.5%	133	0.3%
Posen Region	-	1,335,884	427,232	32.0%	900,059	67.4%	6,943	0.5%
Adelnau	Odolanów	36,306	4,681	12.9%	31,537	86.9%	87	0.2%
Birnbaum	Międzychód	28,887	14,069	48.7%	14,513	50.2%	264	0.9%
Bomst	Babimost	63,120	30,980	49.1%	31,794	50.4%	214	0.3%
Fraustadt	Wschowa	28,914	19,663	68.0%	8,902	30.8%	337	1.2%
Gostyn	Gostyń	48,326	6,528	13.5%	41,720	86.3%	70	0.1%
Grätz	Grodzisk Wielkopolski	36,483	5,997	16.4%	30,280	83.0%	199	0.5%
Jarotschin	Jarocin	51,626	9,236	17.9%	42,168	81.7%	197	0.4%
Kempen	Kępno	37,050	5,933	16.0%	30,697	82.9%	242	0.7%
Koschmin	Koźmin Wielkopolski	33,519	5,719	17.1%	27,685	82.6%	58	0.2%
Kosten	Kościan	47,325	5,149	10.9%	42,091	88.9%	50	0.1%
Krotoschin	Krotoszyn	46,874	15,822	33.8%	30,709	65.5%	325	0.7%
Lissa	Leszno	44,579	27,451	61.6%	16,659	37.4%	427	1.0%
Meseritz	Międzyrzecz	53,306	41,059	77.0%	12,207	22.9%	3	0.0%
Neutomischel	Nowy Tomyśl	34,292	15,700	45.8%	18,481	53.9%	109	0.3%
Obornik	Oborniki	55,880	22,450	40.2%	33,139	59.3%	253	0.5%
Ostrowo	Ostrów Wielkopolski	43,887	9,713	22.1%	33,970	77.4%	166	0.4%
Pleschen	Pleszew	37,362	6,200	16.6%	30,965	82.9%	130	0.3%
City of Posen	Poznań	156,691	65,319	41.7%	89,351	57.0%	1,333	0.9%
Posen West	Poznań, Zach.	43,129	7,374	17.1%	35,474	82.3%	238	0.6%
Posen Ost	Poznań, Wsch.	49,119	14,102	28.7%	34,795	70.8%	178	0.4%
Rawitsch	Rawicz	50,523	21,253	42.1%	29,150	57.7%	99	0.2%
Samter	Szamotuły	66,856	17,071	25.5%	49,589	74.2%	145	0.2%
Schildberg	Ostrzeszów	37,290	5,470	14.7%	31,100	83.4%	718	1.9%
Schmiegel	Śmigiel	36,383	6,626	18.2%	29,544	81.2%	208	0.6%
Schrimm	Śrem	57,483	10,017	17.4%	47,088	81.9%	368	0.6%
Schroda	Środa Wielkopolska	49,176	6,201	12.6%	42,870	87.2%	92	0.2%
Schwerin	Skwierzyna	21,620	19,729	91.3%	1,722	8.0%	143	0.7%
Wreschen	Września	39,878	7,720	19.4%	31,859	79.9%	290	0.7%

The numbers in the 'German' column include the German-speaking Jewish population.

== Presidents ==
The province was headed by presidents (German: Oberpräsidenten).

Term	Name
1815–1824	Joseph Zerboni di Sposetti
1825–1830	Johann Friedrich Theodor von Baumann
1830–1840	Eduard Heinrich von Flottwell
1840–1842	Adolf Heinrich von Arnim-Boitzenburg
1843–1850	Carl Moritz von Beurmann
1850–1851	Gustav Carl Gisbert Heinrich Wilhelm Gebhard von Bonin
1851–1860	Eugen von Puttkamer
1860–1862	Gustav Carl Gisbert Heinrich Wilhelm Gebhard von Bonin
1862–1869	Carl Wilhelm Heinrich Georg von Horn
1869–1873	Otto von Königsmarck
1873–1886	William Barstow von Guenther
1886–1890	Robert Graf von Zedtlitz-Trützschler
1890–1899	Hugo Freiherr von Wilamowitz-Moellendorff
1899–1903	Karl Julius Rudolf von Bitter
1903–1911	Wilhelm August Hans von Waldow-Reitzenstein
1911–1914	Philipp Schwartzkopff
1914–1918	Johann Karl Friedrich Moritz Ferdinand von Eisenhart-Rothe

== Notable people ==
- Stanisław Adamski (1875–1967), Polish priest, social and political activist of the Union of Catholic Societies of Polish Workers (Związek Katolickich Towarzystw Robotników Polskich), founder and editor of the 'Robotnik' (Worker) weekly
- Leo Baeck (1873–1956), German rabbi, scholar, and theologian
- Tomasz K. Bartkiewcz (1865–1931), Polish composer and organist, co-founder of the Singer Circles Union (Związek Kół Śpiewackich)
- Wernher von Braun (1912 –1977) German rocket engineer and space architect; credited as being the "Father of Rocket Science"
- Czesław Czypicki (1855–1926), Polish lawyer from Kożmin, activist for the singers' societies
- Michał Drzymała (1857–1937), Polish peasant who lived in a circus wagon to circumvent Germanisation measures
- Ferdinand Hansemann (1861–1900), Prussian politician, co-founder of the German Eastern Marches Society
- Paul von Hindenburg (1847–1934), German field marshal and statesman, last President of Germany before Adolf Hitler
- Józef Kościelski (1845–1911), Polish politician and parliamentarian, co-founder of the Straż (Guard) society
- Józef Krzymiński (1858–1940), Polish physician, social and political activist, member of parliament
- Władysław Marcinkowski (1858–1947), Polish sculptor who created a monument of Adam Mickiewicz in Milosław
- Bernd Baron von Maydell (1934–2018), German lawyer and author
- Władysław Niegolewski (1819–85), Polish liberal politician and member of parliament, insurgent in 1846, 1848 and 1863, cofounder of TCL and CTG
- Cyryl Ratajski (1875–1942), president of Poznań 1922–34
- Arthur Ruppin (1876–1943), sociologist, Zionist thinker and leader, co-founder of Tel Aviv
- Karol Rzepecki (1865–1931), Polish bookseller, social and political activist, editor of Sokół (Falcon) magazine
- Antoni Stychel (1859–1935), Polish priest, member of parliament, president of the Union of the Catholic Societies of Polish Workers (Związek Katolickich Towarzystw Robotników Polskich)
- Roman Szymański (1840–1908), Polish political activist, publicist, editor of Orędownik magazine
- Alfred Trzebinski (1902–1946), SS-physician at several Nazi concentration camps; executed for war crimes
- Aniela Tułodziecka (1853–1932), Polish educational activist of the Warta Society (Towarzystwo Przyjaciół Wzajemnego Pouczania się i Opieki nad Dziećmi Warta)
- Piotr Wawrzyniak (1849–1910), Polish priest, economic and educational activist, patron of Union of the Earnings and Economic Societies (Związek Spółek Zarobkowych i Gospodarczych)
