= Posen (region) =

Prussian administrative region

Coordinates: 52°24′00″N 16°55′00″E

Province of Posen 1887-1919 Regierungsbezirk Posen

Posen was the southern of two Prussian administrative regions, or Regierungsbezirke (Polish: rejencja), of the Grand Duchy of Posen (1815–1849) and its successor, the Province of Posen (1849–1918). The administrative region was bordered on the north by Regierungsbezirk Bromberg, to the west by the Province of Brandenburg, to the south by the Silesia Province, and to the east by Russian Congress Poland.

The Posen region was inhabited mainly by Poles practicing Roman Catholicism, although it had a minority of Germans, mostly Protestants. After World War I, most of the territory of this region was ceded to Poland.

== Divisions ==
Note: Prussian provinces were subdivided into units called Kreise (singular Kreis, abbreviated Kr., English "circle"), which were similar to large counties in US terms. Cities would have their own Stadtkreis (English: "urban district") and the surrounding rural area would be named for the city, but referred to as a Landkreis (English: "rural district"). In the case of Posen, the Landkreis was split into two: Landkreis Posen West, and Landkreis Posen East. The region was originally divided into 16 larger Kreise, which were later divided into the final 27 Kreise, the larger ones spinning off smaller units.

== Demographics ==
The administrative region of Posen had a majority Polish population, with a significant German minority who were mostly concentrated in the western districts.

Ethnolinguistic structure in Regierungsbezirk Posen (1910)
District	Polish Name	Population	German	%	Polish	%	Bilingual	%
Adelnau	Odolanów	36,306	4,681	12.9%	31,537	86.9%	87	0.2%
Birnbaum	Międzychód	28,887	14,069	48.7%	14,513	50.2%	264	0.9%
Bomst	Babimost	63,120	30,980	49.1%	31,794	50.4%	214	0.3%
Fraustadt	Wschowa	28,914	19,663	68.0%	8,902	30.8%	332	1.1%
Gostyn	Gostyń	48,326	6,528	13.5%	41,720	86.3%	70	0.1%
Grätz	Grodzisk Wielkopolski	36,483	5,997	16.4%	30,280	83.0%	191	0.5%
Jarotschin	Jarocin	51,626	9,236	17.9%	42,168	81.7%	197	0.4%
Kempen	Kępno	37,050	5,933	16.0%	30,697	82.9%	236	0.6%
Koschmin	Koźmin Wielkopolski	33,519	5,719	17.1%	27,685	82.6%	58	0.2%
Kosten	Kościan	47,325	5,149	10.9%	42,091	88.9%	50	0.1%
Krotoschin	Krotoszyn	46,874	15,822	33.8%	30,709	65.5%	324	0.7%
Lissa	Leszno	44,579	27,451	61.6%	16,659	37.4%	426	1.0%
Meseritz	Międzyrzecz	53,306	41,059	77.0%	12,207	22.9%	0	0.0%
Neutomischel	Nowy Tomyśl	34,292	15,700	45.8%	18,481	53.9%	109	0.3%
Obornik	Oborniki	55,880	22,450	40.2%	33,139	59.3%	245	0.4%
Ostrowo	Ostrów Wielkopolski	43,887	9,713	22.1%	33,970	77.4%	165	0.4%
Pleschen	Pleszew	37,362	6,200	16.6%	30,965	82.9%	128	0.3%
Stadtkreis Posen	Poznań	156,691	65,319	41.7%	89,351	57.0%	1,311	0.8%
Posen West	Poznań, Zach.	43,129	7,374	17.1%	35,474	82.3%	236	0.5%
Posen Ost	Poznań, Wsch.	49,119	14,102	28.7%	34,795	70.8%	174	0.4%
Rawitsch	Rawicz	50,523	21,253	42.1%	29,150	57.7%	92	0.2%
Samter	Szamotuły	66,856	17,071	25.5%	49,589	74.2%	143	0.2%
Schildberg	Ostrzeszów	37,290	5,470	14.7%	31,100	83.4%	718	1.9%
Schmiegel	Śmigiel	36,383	6,626	18.2%	29,544	81.2%	207	0.6%
Schrimm	Śrem	57,483	10,017	17.4%	47,088	81.9%	366	0.6%
Schroda	Środa Wielkopolska	49,176	6,201	12.6%	42,870	87.2%	92	0.2%
Schwerin in Posen	Skwierzyna	21,620	19,729	91.3%	1,722	8.0%	142	0.7%
Wreschen	Września	39,878	7,720	19.4%	31,859	79.9%	290	0.7%
Total	-	1,335,884	427,232	32.0%	900,059	67.4%	6,867	0.5%
