= Kreis Posen West =

Former district of Posen, Prussia

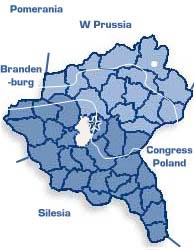

Kreis Posen West was a Kreis in Prussia (county) in the southern administrative district of Posen, in the province of Posen.
