= Kreis Posen Ost =

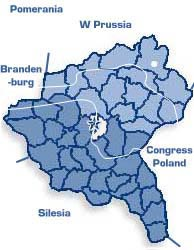

Kreis Posen Ost was a Kreis in Prussia (county) in the southern administrative district of Posen, in the province of Posen.

In 1910, the district had a population of 49,119. According to the 1910 Prussian census, 14,102 (28.71%) spoke German, 34,795 (70.84%) spoke Polish, 178 (0.36%) were bilingual and 44 (0.09%) spoken other languages.
