= Polish Electoral Society in Silesia =

Political party in Poland

Polish Electoral Society in Silesia Polskie Towarzystwo Wyborcze na Śląsku (Polish)
- Leader: Jan Nepomucen Stęślicki
- Founded: 9 November 1902
- Ideology: National Democracy; Patriotism; Populism
- National affiliation: National League

The Polish Electoral Society in Silesia (Polish: Polskie Towarzystwo Wyborcze na Śląsku, PTW) was a National Democratic (Endecja) Polish electoral party founded in 1902 by members of the National League.

== History ==
On 1 November 1902, the National League in Upper Silesia was seeking to cooperate with the rival media magnate Adam Napieralski in the creation of an electoral party to contest the next German election, fearing that his media, oriented around the newspaper Katolik, would go on a mass offensive against the League's candidates. Due to Napieraliski's refusal, the National League decided to create a party independent of him on 9 November 1902, however, the party unsuccessfully continued in its attempts to recruit Napieralski to their cause. Efforts were made by the National League to unite PTW with other Endecja-aligned electoral parties in other parts of the Prussian partition. In June 1903, the Central Electoral Committee in the Grand Duchy of Posen proposed the creation of an Endecja-aligned Central Electoral Committee in the German Reich.

=== 1903 German federal election ===
In the 1903 German federal election, the party ran seven candidates in seven constituencies: Wojciech Korfanty in Kattowitz-Zabrze, Jan Nepomucen Stęślicki in Beuthen-Tarnowitz, Józef Siemianowski in Lublinitz-Tost-Gleiwitz, Jan J. Kowalczyk in Pleß-Rybnik, Paweł Hanslik in Groß Strehlitz-Kosel, Piotr Reszka in Kreuzburg-Rosenberg and Józef Rostek in Ratibor. The electoral campaign was managed by Maksymilian Hanke. Contemporaries described the electoral mood as energetic, voting for PTW was seen as a rebellion from Germanization and admission to Polish identity. During the electoral campaign, the Prussian police tried to arrest Korfanty and Kowalczyk for distributing illegal literature, but the judiciary rejected the Police's claims. The party won 44 thousand votes, 35% of all votes in the constituencies they contested. Only one candidate, Wojciech Korfanty, won a seat, with 23,550 votes against 22,875 cast for his opponent, Paul Letocha. Kowalczyk came close to victory, winning 47% of votes in the first round, but failing in the second. After the election, Korfanty joined the Polish Circle in the Reichstag, being the first Upper Silesian in the Reichstag to do so.

==== Campaign in the Kattowitz-Zabrze constituency ====
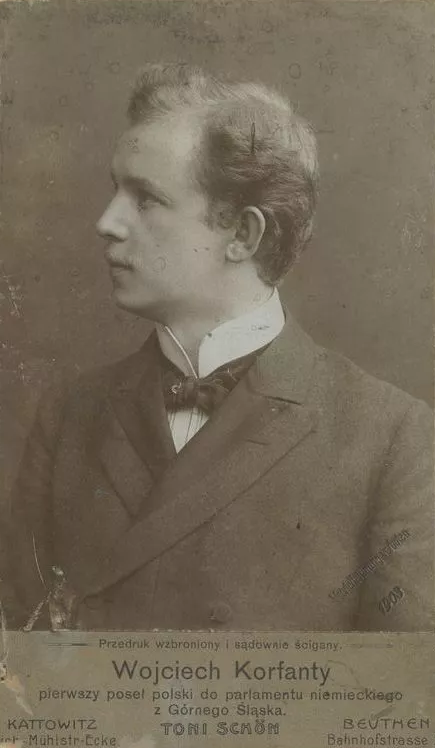
Wojciech Korfanty in 1903

Korfanty's electoral campaign was fierce, with the candidate attending dozens of rallies. Contesting against Zentrumspartei candidate Paul Letocha and PPS-SPD candidate Franciszek Morawski, he attacked them in his newspaper Górnoślązak, which he was the chief editor of. His attacks against the anti-Polish, pro-Zentrum German Catholic hierarchy would earn him a condemnation from Prince-Bishop of Breslau Georg von Kopp. As a future consequence, the German hierarchy would refuse to let Korfanty partake in the sacrament of marriage unless he issued them an apology, which he rejected and married abroad in the Diocese of Kraków months later. Korfanty was aided by the innovativeness of his campaign; his newspaper, Górnoślązak, printed thousands of postcards with his image, Korfanty cooperated with an entrepreneur to create "Korfanty" brand cigarettes. He was seen widely as a political radical. The first turn of the election on 16 June saw PPS candidate Morawski eliminated with Letocha winning only a plurality of votes. PPS would thus endorse the radical Korfanty, leading to his victory in the runoff on 27 June, winning 23,550 votes against Letocha's 22,875.

== Ideology ==
The party advocated only to vote for candidates which would ender the Polish Circle in the Reichstag, as opposed to Zentrum, which all even ethnically Polish and Silesian candidates did before them. It was operated by local National League activists, and was a political body of the National Democratic movement.

== Electoral results ==
=== Reichstag ===
Election year	# of votes	% of vote	# of overall seats won
1903	44,175	0.47	1 / 397
