= Kreis Schrimm =

District in Prussia (1793–1918)

Coordinates: 52°05′00″N 17°01′00″E

Location of the Schrimm district

Kreis Schrimm (Polish: Powiat śremski) was a district in the southern administrative region of Posen, in the Prussian province of Posen. The district capital was Schrimm. Its territory presently lies in the southern part of the Greater Poland Voivodeship in Poland.

== History ==
After the Second Partition of Poland in 1793 and until 1807, the area around the town of Schrimm belonged to the Schrimm district in the Prussian province of South Prussia. According to the Treaty of Tilsit in 1807, the area was ceded to the Duchy of Warsaw. After the Congress of Vienna, on 15 May 1815, it was restored to the Kingdom of Prussia and became part of Regierungsbezirk Posen in the Grand Duchy of Posen (from 1848, the Province of Posen).

In the course of the Prussian administrative reforms, a district reform was carried out in the Posen administrative region on 1 January 1818, in which the borders of the Schrimm district were changed. The area around the town of Moschin was transferred to the Schrimm district from the Kosten district and the area around the town of Jaratsechwo was transferred to the Schrimm district from the Krotoschin district. Finally, the area around Kostschin and Santomischel was transferred from the Schrimm district to the Schroda district.

As part of the Province of Posen, the district became part of the newly founded German Empire on 18 January 1871. On 1 October 1887 the district lost parts of its territory to the two newly formed neighboring districts of Jarotschin and Gostyn.

On 27 December 1918 the Greater Poland uprising began in the province of Posen, and in January 1919, the district was under Polish control. On 16 February 1919 an armistice ended the Polish-German fighting, and on 28 June 1919, with the signing of the Treaty of Versailles, the German government officially ceded the Schrimm district to the newly founded Second Polish Republic.

== Demographics ==
According to the census of 1861, the Schrimm district had a population of 54,036, of which 14,234 (26.3%) were Germans and 39,802 (73.7%) were Poles.
