= Kreis Wreschen =

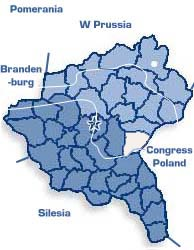

Kreis Wreschen (Polish: Powiat wrzesiński) was a county in the southern administrative district of Posen, in the Prussian province of Posen. It presently lies in the eastern part of Polish region of Greater Poland Voivodeship.

== History ==
The area around the two Polish towns of Września and Pyzdry were ceded to the Kingdom of Prussia in the aftermath of the Vienna Congress. They formed the newly created County of Pyzdry (Ger: Kreis Peysern). The administrative seat was Pyzdry.

On 11 November 1817 the border was corrected and the eastern rim of the county was ceded to Congress Poland, Wreschen (Września) became the new administrative seat. Consequently, the name was changed to Kreis Wreschen (Wreschen County) on 31 July 1819.

== Civil registry offices ==
In 1905, these civil registry offices (German: Standesamt) served the following towns in Kreis Wreschen:

List of all communities with more than 400 inhabitants (as of 1910). The table shows the traditional Polish name, the name during the Prussian administration from 1815 to 1919 and the name during the Nazi occupation.

Polish name	Prussian name (1815–1919)	Nazi-regime name (1939–1945)
Biechowo	Biechowo	Lorenzdorf
Bugaj	Bugaj	Bügen
Czeszewo	Czeszewo	Zeugnersruh
Gozdowo	Gozdowo; Gosdau (1906–1919)	Gosdau
Kaczanowo	Kaczanowo	Entenau
Miłosław	Miloslaw	Liebenau (1939–1943); Liebenstädt (1943–1945)
Nowa Wieś Królewska	Königlich Neudorf	Königlich Neudorf (1939–1943); Königsneudorf (1943–1945)
Oblaczkowo	Oblaczkowo; Oblatschkowo (1906–1919)	Runddorf (1939–1943); Kringeln (1943–1945)
Psary Polskie	Polnisch Psary	Feldkamp
Sędziwojewo	Sendschau	Sendschau
Skarboszewo	Skarboszewo	Karben
Sokolniki	Sokolnik; Sockelstein (1906–1919)	Sockelstein
Strzałkowo	Strzalkowo; Stralkowo (1906–1919)	Stralkau
Szamarzewo	Szamarzewo	Ellerode
Szemborowo	Szemborowo	Langdorf (1939–1943); Schembau (1943–1945)
Września	Wreschen	Wreschen
