= Marcin Kasprzak Memorial =

Monument in Warsaw, Poland

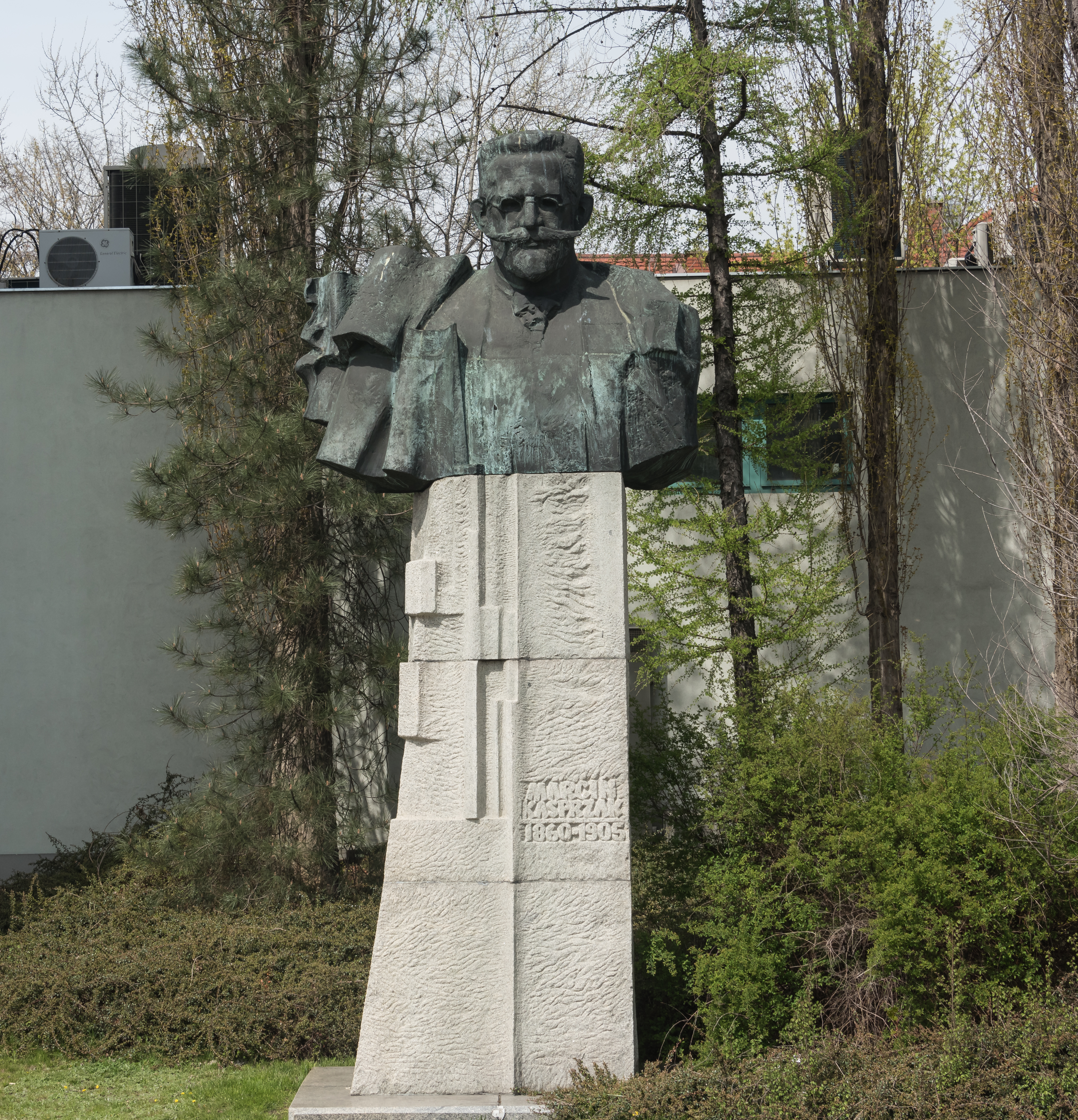
- The monument in 2021.
- Interactive map of Marcin Kasprzak Memorial
- Location: 18 and 20 Kasprzaa Street, Wola, Warsaw, Poland
- Coordinates: 52°13′45.4″N 20°58′21.9″E
- Designer: Edmund Matuszek
- Type: Bust
- Material: Bronze, granite
- Opening date: 1975
- Dedicated to: Marcin Kasprzak

The Marcin Kasprzak Memorial (Polish: Pomnik Marcina Kasprzaka) is a monument in Warsaw, Poland, at 18 and 20 Kasprzaka Street, within the district of Wola. It consists of a bronze bust of Marcin Kasprzak, a 19th- and 20th-century labour movement activist, placed on a granite pedestal. It was designed by Edmund Matuszek, and unveiled in 1975.

== History ==
The monument was designed by Edmund Matuszek, and dedicated to Marcin Kasprzak, a 19th- and 20th-century labour movement activist. It was unveiled in 1975, in front of building of Zakłady Radiowe im. Marcina Kasprzaka (Marcin Kasprzak Radio Company) at 18 and 20 Kasprzaka Street.

== Characteristics ==
The monument is located within the neighbourhood of Czyste in the district of Wola. It consists of a bronze bust of Marcin Kasprzak placed on a granite pedestal. Ot bears the following inscription: "Marcin Kasprzak 1860–1905".
