= Kreis Pleschen =

Coordinates: 51°53′38″N 17°46′58″E

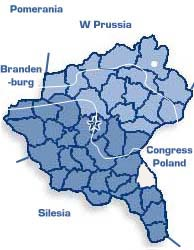

Kreis Pleschen (Polish: Powiat pleszewski) was a county in the southern administrative district of Posen, in the Prussian province of Posen. It presently lies in the south-eastern part of Polish region of Greater Poland Voivodeship.
