= Bill in lemon =

Magic trick

The bill in lemon is an effect in which a magician requests a currency note from a spectator and makes the note vanish, then proceeding to slice a lemon open to show the note inside. Variations include the coin in orange, and more generally "something in fruit".

== Effect ==
The magician asks an audience member for a paper bill, and then has them mark it in some way — signing it, tearing a corner off, memorizing the serial number, or similar. The magician then destroys the bill, ripping it up or causing it to burst into flame. The magician then introduces a lemon and proceeds to cut it in half. The two halves of the lemon are pulled apart and the original bill is found inside. The audience can then verify that it is indeed their bill by comparing it to whatever they recorded earlier.

== Method ==
Prior to performing the trick, the magician prepares the lemon by cutting a long slot into it by forcing a knife or pencil into the fruit from the end. A bill or card is then folded up and inserted into the hole. The flesh of the fruit will close up when the knife is removed, becoming very difficult to see. The hole can be hidden even better if the fruit has a stem, which can be removed and then glued back into place to cover the hole.

The simplest versions of the trick rely on the object in the lemon being merely a copy of the one provided by the audience member — that is, the trick becomes simply an elaborate way to reveal the result of a magician's force. For example, the audience member selects the two of clubs, their original card is destroyed, and the lemon is cut open to reveal another two of clubs.

The magician may compare marks on the audience member's object to marks on the object inside the lemon. A common method is to tear the original card into sixths or eighths, give one piece to the audience member to hold as a "receipt," and vanish the other pieces; when the lemon is opened, the card inside is shown to be intact except for a torn corner exactly matching the "receipt." This effect can be accomplished by palming the corner torn from the prepared card and then forcing the audience member to choose that piece.

Some versions do not rely on a different prepared object, but instead reveal the audience member's actual original object at the end of the trick. This variation is often known as "signed bill in lemon." There are at least three places in the trick where a switch may be performed: First, the lemon may be prepared with a dummy bill which is switched for the signed bill after opening. Second, the lemon may be prepared surreptitiously during the act. Third, a dummy (unprepared) lemon may be introduced at the beginning of the act; the real lemon is surreptitiously prepared during the act, and the magician switches lemons sometime prior to the reveal. The third method is the most convincing, because the switch can take place while the lemon is not the center of attention.

== Famous performers ==
The coin in orange version of the trick dates to at least the mid-1800s, and appears in Modern Magic in 1876. This was a relatively complex version that uses two oranges and considerable stagecraft to complete.

The bill in lemon version is credited to Emil Jarrow (1875-1959), who made it a feature of his vaudeville act during the first half of the twentieth century. Jarrow would borrow as many as three different bills from members of the audience, causing them to later reappear inside of the lemon. Other famous performers of the effect included T. Nelson Downs, Max Malini, Bob Haskell and Billy McComb among many others.

Several modern magicians have presented their own versions of the effect, including Bill Malone, Doc Eason, and Michael Ammar.
