= Emil Jarrow =

German-American sleight of hand magician (1876–1959)

- Born: Emil Javorzynski; April 8, 1876; Pleschen Stadt, Prussia
- Died: March 4, 1959 (aged 82); Islip, New York
- Occupations: Magician, strongman

Emil Jarrow (April 8, 1876 – March 4, 1959) was a sleight of hand magician. He sometimes referred to himself humorously as a "prestidigitator." Jarrow (also spelled Jaro & Jarow) was perhaps best known for creating the “lemon trick,” in which he would procure paper money from an apparently fresh lemon.

== Career and performances ==
Jarrow was born Emil Javorzynski in Pleschen Stadt, in Prussia (now Pleszew, Poland). In 1891, as a young man of 15, he began his professional career as a strongman for the Buffalo Bill’s Wild West show in Germany. He travelled with the show when it moved to England and then the United States the following year. Later, he began working independently by performing acts of strength in local venues, in Chicago and New York.

Some years later, after a stage accident left a leg permanently damaged, he reinvented himself as a sleight of hand artist with a flair for humor and a thick Low Dutch-accented patter, with which he accompanied his performances. Jarrow became quite adept with closely observed sleight-of-hand tricks. For instance, while seated at a dining table, he would unwind the salt shaker lid and empty it into his fist, and with a flourish, “vanish” the salt only to have it later reappear. The props he used for his illusions were simple, household items, rather than elaborate devices. Friendly with his peers, including Harry Houdini, he had a particularly fond relationship with Harry Blackstone, Sr., who would remain his friend until his death at the posh Percy Williams Home for Retired Actors and Actresses on Long Island.

Jarrow was an early friend of Houdini. They had briefly worked together at a Coney Island performance in 1891.

== The lemon trick ==
In what would become his trademark trick, Jarrow would borrow a banknote, only to have it “disappear”. He would then offer a lemon to be examined, cut it in two with a pocket knife, and reveal the missing, crisp paper bill within. The "Bill in lemon," as magicians would later refer to the effect, became popular with many performers. Jarrow's name became synonymous with the routine and his theatrical billing was often "Jarrow: Originator of The Lemon Trick." During the early 1920s when the stage illusion of "Sawing A Woman in Half" was at the peak of its popularity, Jarrow wryly billed his act as "Sawing a Lemon In Half."

== Publications ==
- Rope Magic: How to Do Rope Tricks: Professional Secrets Exposed for Amateur Use (1941)
