= Kreis Schmiegel =

Coordinates: 52°00′33″N 16°31′07″E

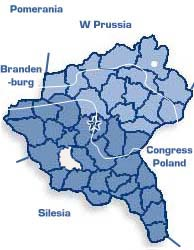

Kreis Schmiegel (Polish: Powiat śmigielski) was a county in the southern administrative district of Posen, in the Prussian province of Posen. It presently lies in the southern part of Polish region of Greater Poland Voivodeship.
