= Kreis Neutomischel =

1887–1919 Prussian district

Coordinates: 52°19′00″N 16°08′00″E

Location of Kreis Neutomischel

Kreis Neutomischel (Polish: Powiat nowotomyski) was a district in the southern administrative region of Posen, in the Prussian province of Posen from 1887 to 1919. It presently lies in the western part of Polish region of Greater Poland Voivodeship. The district was formed in 1887, when Kreis Buk was bifurcated.

== Demographics ==
The district had a German majority in 1890. However, due to the emigration of Germans to western regions of Germany and the higher growth rate among the Polish population, Poles formed the majority by 1900. According to the Prussian census of 1910, Kreis Neutomischel had a population of 34,292, of which 54% were Poles and 46% were Germans.

After the Greater Poland uprising of 1918-1919, the district was ceded to Poland and many Germans left the area.

== Civil registry offices ==
In 1905, these civil registry offices (German: Standesamt) served the following town in Kreis Neutomischel: Neutomischel
