= Kreis Ostrowo =

Coordinates: 51°39′00″N 17°42′00″E

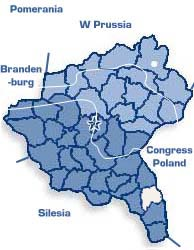

Kreis Ostrowo (Polish: Powiat ostrowski) was a county in the southern administrative district of Posen, in the Prussian province of Posen. It presently lies in the southern part of Polish region of Greater Poland Voivodeship.
