= Pleszew =

Town in Greater Poland Voivodeship, Poland

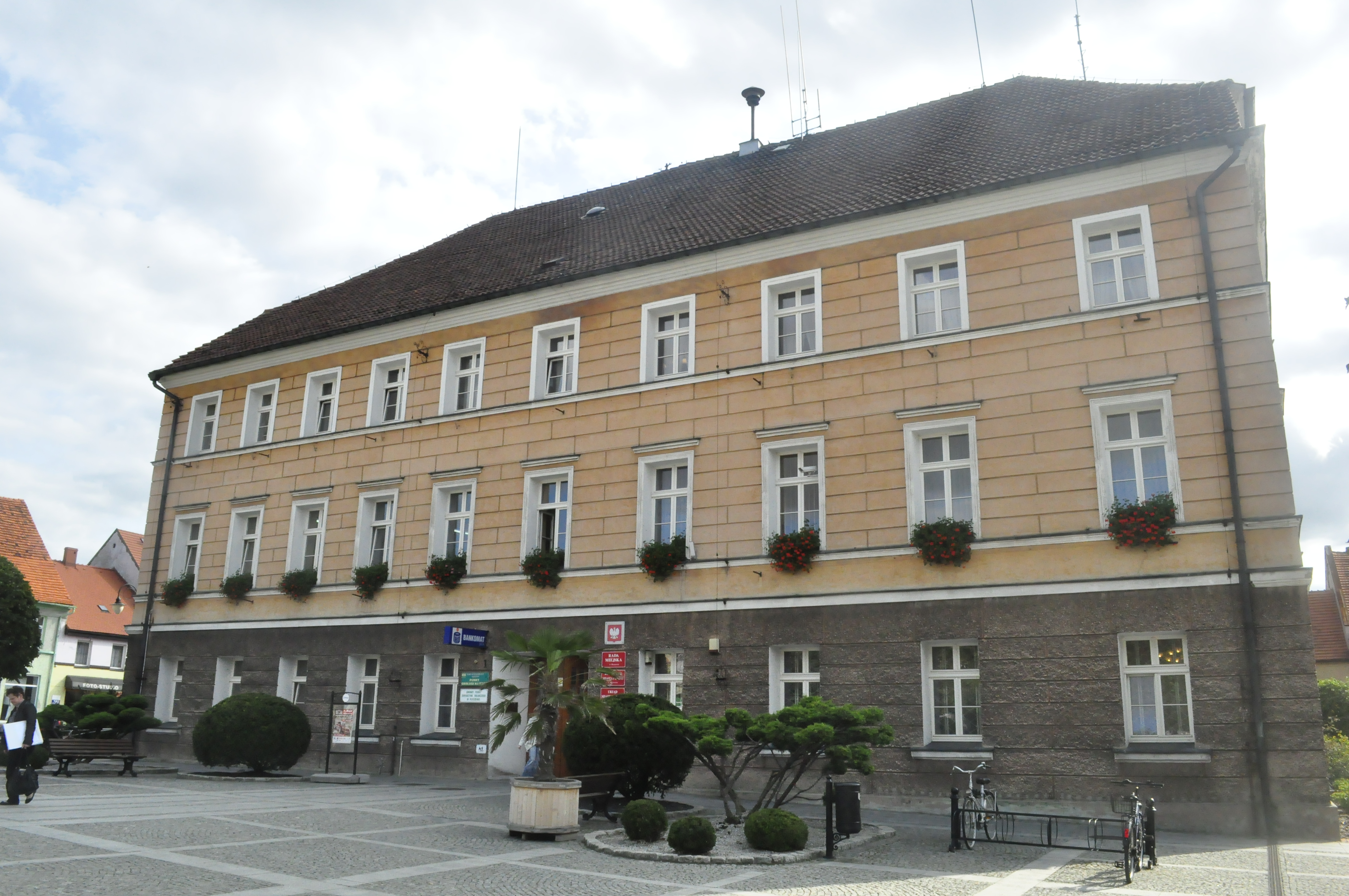
- Town hall

- Flag Coat of arms

- Location within Poland
- Coordinates: 51°53′N 17°47′E
- Country: Poland
- Voivodeship: Greater Poland
- County: Pleszew
- Gmina: Pleszew
- Town rights: 1283

Government
  - Mayor: Arkadiusz Ptak

Area
  - Total: 13.19 km^{2} (5.09 sq mi)

Population (2022)
  - Total: 16,811
  - Density: 1,275/km^{2} (3,301/sq mi)
- Time zone: UTC+1 (CET)
  - Summer (DST): UTC+2 (CEST)
- Postal code: 63-300
- Area code: +48 62
- Car plates: PPL
- Climate: Dfb
- Website: https://pleszew.pl/

Pleszew (Polish pronunciation: [ˈplɛʂɛf]) is a town in central Poland, in Greater Poland Voivodeship, about 90 km southeast of Poznań. It is the capital of Pleszew County. The town's population is 16,811 (2022). The town is claimed to be a 15-minute city.

== History ==
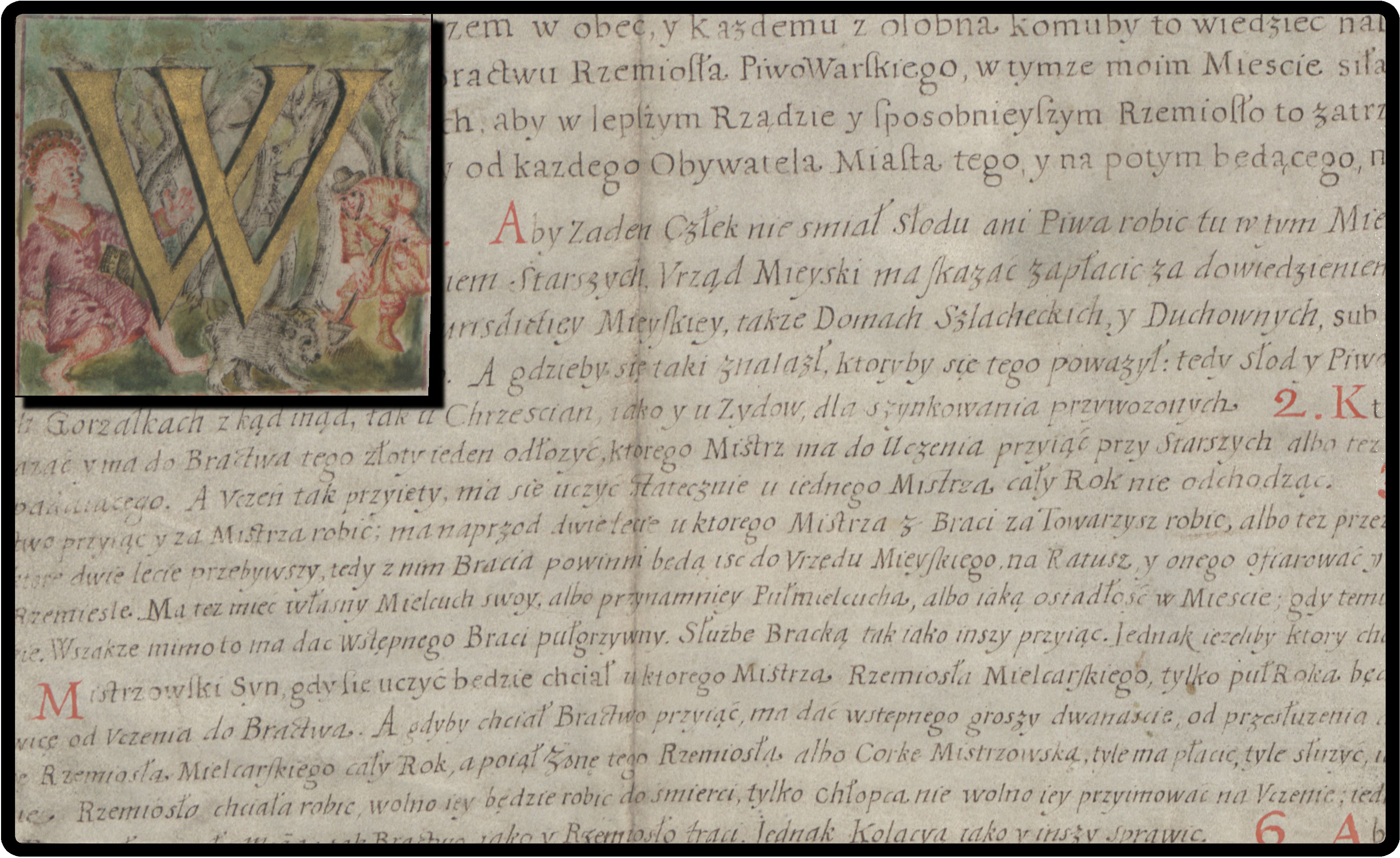
Guild document from Pleszew from 1630

The oldest permanent human settlements in the present-day Pleszew and its surroundings date back to the 9th century BC. The oldest known mention of Pleszew, already as a town, comes from a 1283 document of - in the document of Duke and future King of Poland Przemysł II of the Piast dynasty. In the following centuries it was a private town owned by Polish nobility, located in the Kalisz Voivodeship in the Greater Poland Province of the Polish Crown. King John I Albert in the privilege of 1493 permitted the organization of two weekly markets and two annual fairs. In the early 16th century, there were nine craft guilds in the town. Pleszew was a local center of Reformation. In the 18th century, one of two main routes connecting Warsaw and Dresden ran through Pleszew and Kings Augustus II the Strong and Augustus III of Poland traveled that route numerous times. The 1st Polish Infantry Regiment was stationed in the town in 1792 before it was relocated to Parczew.

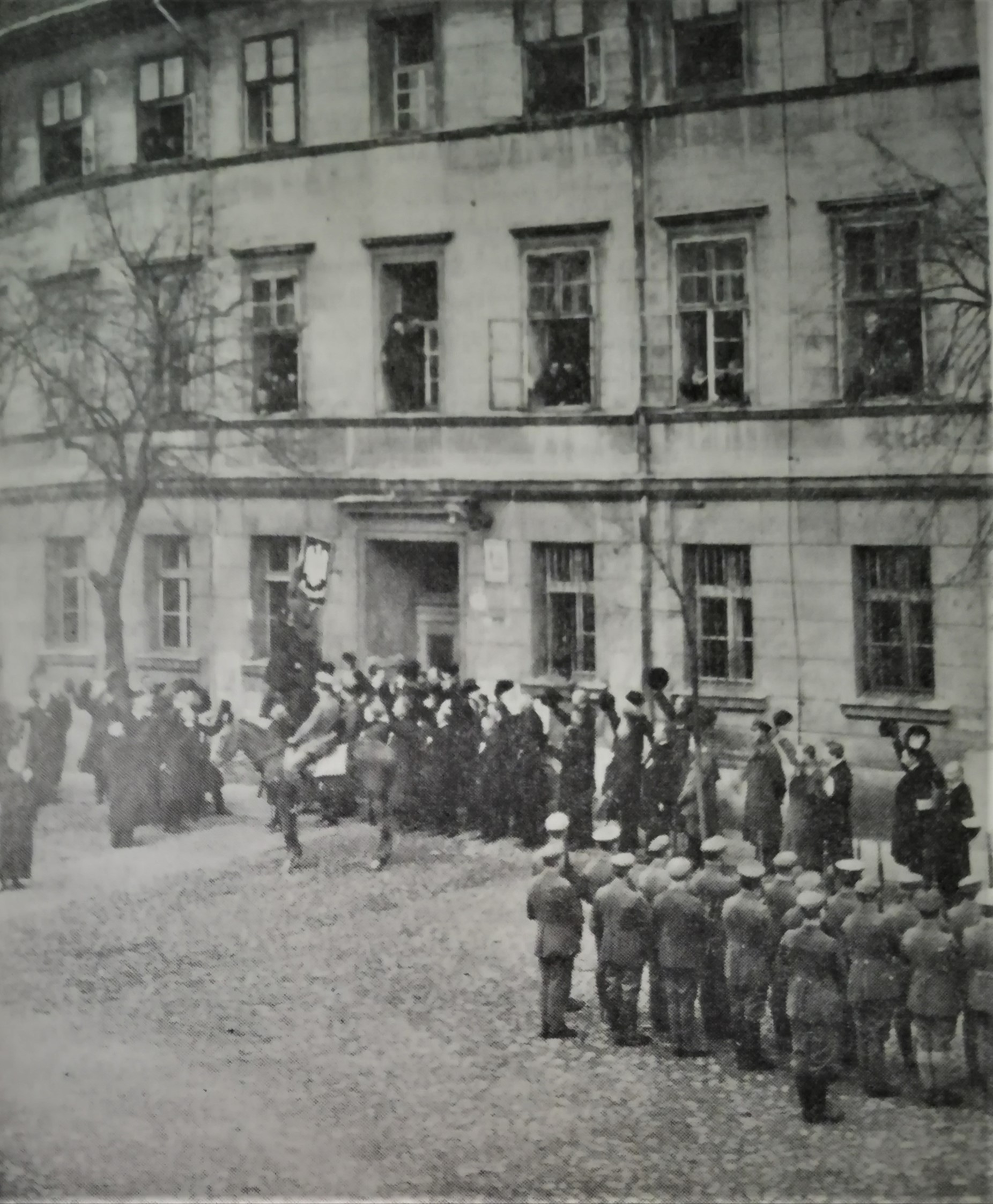
Polish insurgents place the coat of arms of Poland on the town hall in liberated Pleszew, January 1919

During the Second Partition of Poland, in 1793, Pleszew was annexed by Prussia. After the successful Greater Poland uprising of 1806, it was regained by Poles and included within the short-lived Duchy of Warsaw, before it was re-annexed by Prussia in 1815. During the period of the Partitions of Poland, Pleszew was known by its German name, Pleschen.

It was an important center of the unsuccessful Polish Greater Poland uprising (1848). In the following decades, to resist Germanisation, Poles founded various organizations, including agricultural, industrial and educational societies, the Cooperative Bank (Bank Spółdzielczy), a printing house, scout troops and a local branch of the "Sokół" Polish Gymnastic Society. In the second half of the 19th century, new industrial factories were established.

Historical population
Year	Pop.	±%
1910	8,049	—
1921	7,638	−5.1%
1931	8,591	+12.5%
1939	9,994	+16.3%
1950	8,436	−15.6%
1960	11,035	+30.8%
2010	17,530	+58.9%

In October 1918, a few weeks before Poland regained independence, local Poles began preparations for an uprising, which aim was to reintegrate the town along with the region of Greater Poland with soon to be reborn Poland. Many inhabitants took part in the Greater Poland uprising (1918–19), and seven inhabitants were also killed in the Polish–Soviet War in 1919–1920. The Poles took control of the town in January 1919. Within the interwar Second Polish Republic the local insurgent unit was transformed into a full-fledged infantry regiment of the Polish Army. The 70th Infantry Regiment of the Polish Army was stationed in Pleszew since 1921.

On the day of the German invasion of Poland (World War II), on September 1, 1939, Germany unsuccessfully air raided Polish military barracks, killing 13 civilians instead. Wehrmacht troops entered the town a week later. During the German occupation of Poland, the Polish population was subject to mass arrests, executions and expulsions. Shortly after capturing the town, the Germans established a prison for Polish people in the town. On September 28, 1939, the Germans looted the local museum. During the Intelligenzaktion, in October 1939, the Germans executed 7 Poles in the Boreczek forest. Another 68 Poles were killed in the prison, and 8 Poles were murdered at the Gestapo station. Nevertheless, the Polish resistance movement in Pleszew was organized already in October 1939. Polish underground press issued in Ostrów Wielkopolski was distributed in Pleszew, and local Polish teachers organized secret Polish schooling. In 1940, the Germans expelled 155 Poles, mostly owners of shops and workshops with entire families, and their enterprises were then handed over to German colonists as part of the Lebensraum policy. Poles expelled from other villages in the region were sent as slave labour to new German colonists in the town's vicinity, and there was also a forced labour camp in the town in 1944–1945. The Germans also destroyed the gravestone of Polish insurgents fallen in 1919. Shortly before retreating, on January 21, 1945, the Germans carried out a massacre of Poles in the town. The town was captured by the Soviets in January 1945, and was soon restored to Poland, although with a Soviet-installed communist regime, which then stayed in power until the Fall of Communism in the 1980s. Some resistance members were persecuted by the communists in the following years. The devastated gravestone of Polish insurgents was rebuilt in 1947.

In August 1980, workers of the local automatic lathe factory joined the nationwide anti-communist strikes, which led to the foundation of the "Solidarity" organization.

In 1983 the 700th anniversary of Pleszew was celebrated, in reference to the first known historical mention of the town in 1283.

== Sights ==
Among the historic sights of Pleszew are the Market Square (Rynek) with the Town Hall (Ratusz), the Regional Museum, the churches of Beheading of Saint John the Baptist, of Saint Florian and of the Holy Savior, and other historic buildings, including headquarters of historic organizations, townhouses and schools. There also numerous memorials at the sites of killings of Poles carried out by the Germans during the occupation of Poland.

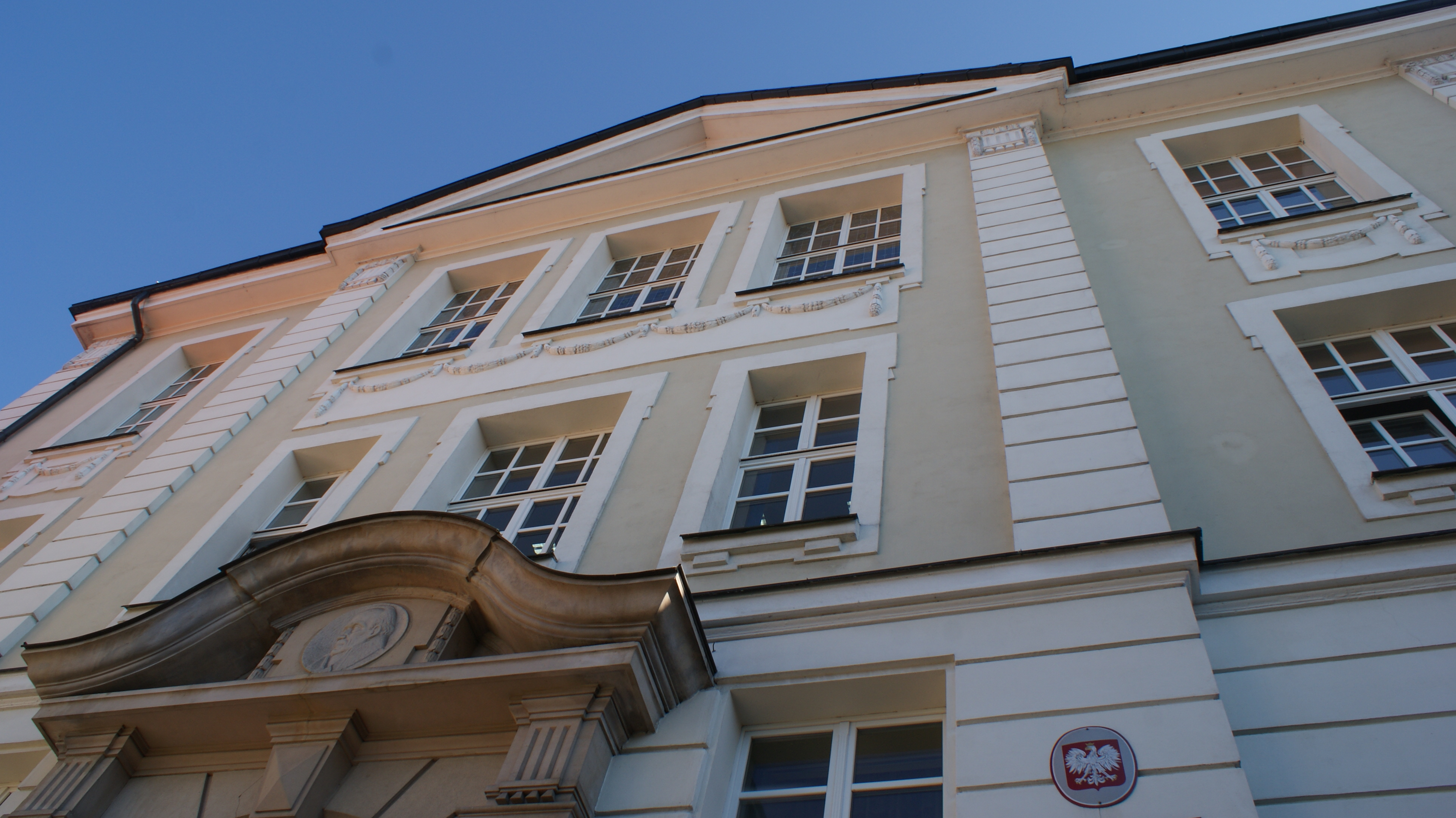
High school

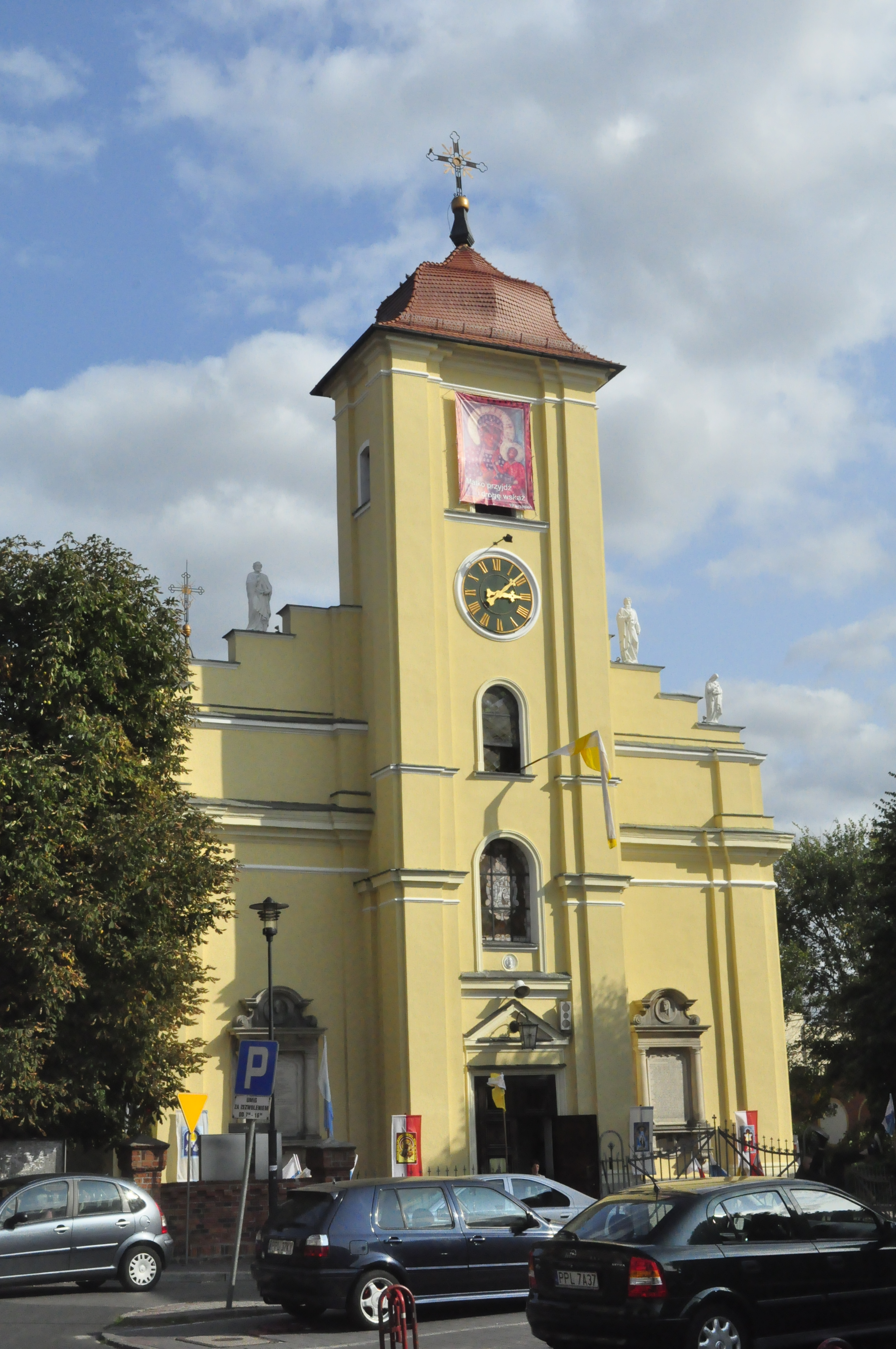
Church of the Beheading of Saint John the Baptist

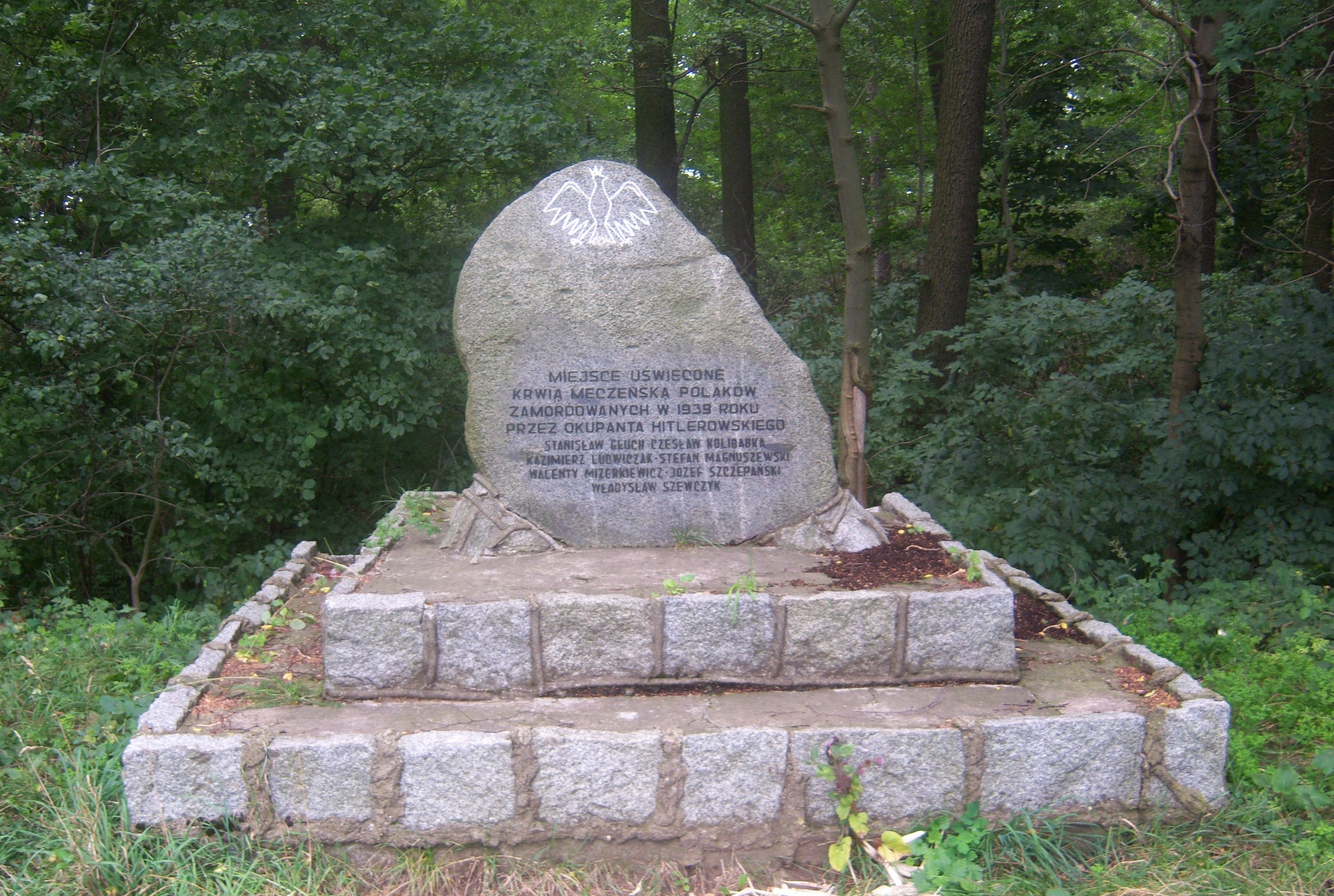
Memorial stone in the Boreczek forest at the site of a German execution of 7 Poles in 1939

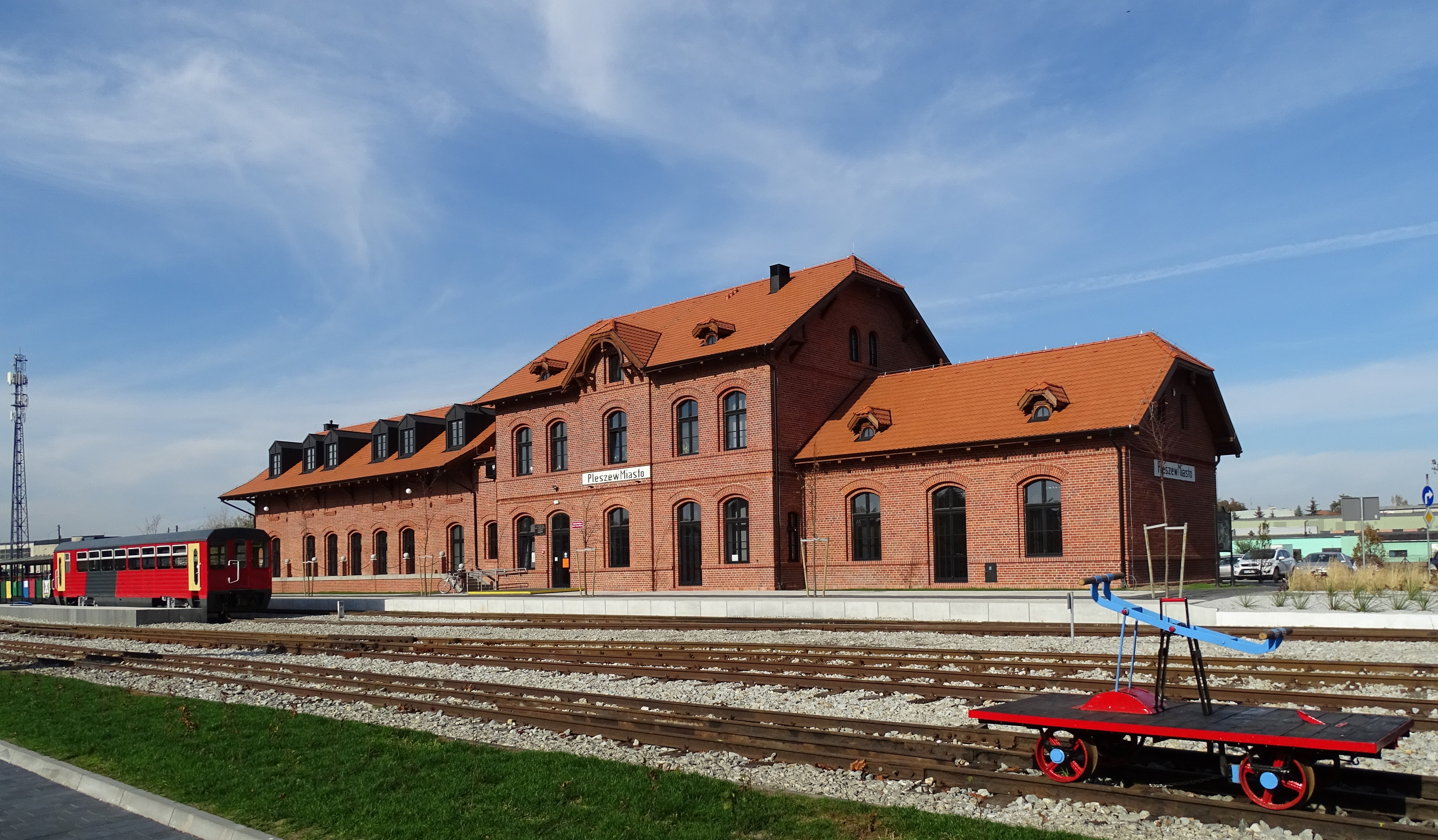
Narrow-gauge railway station

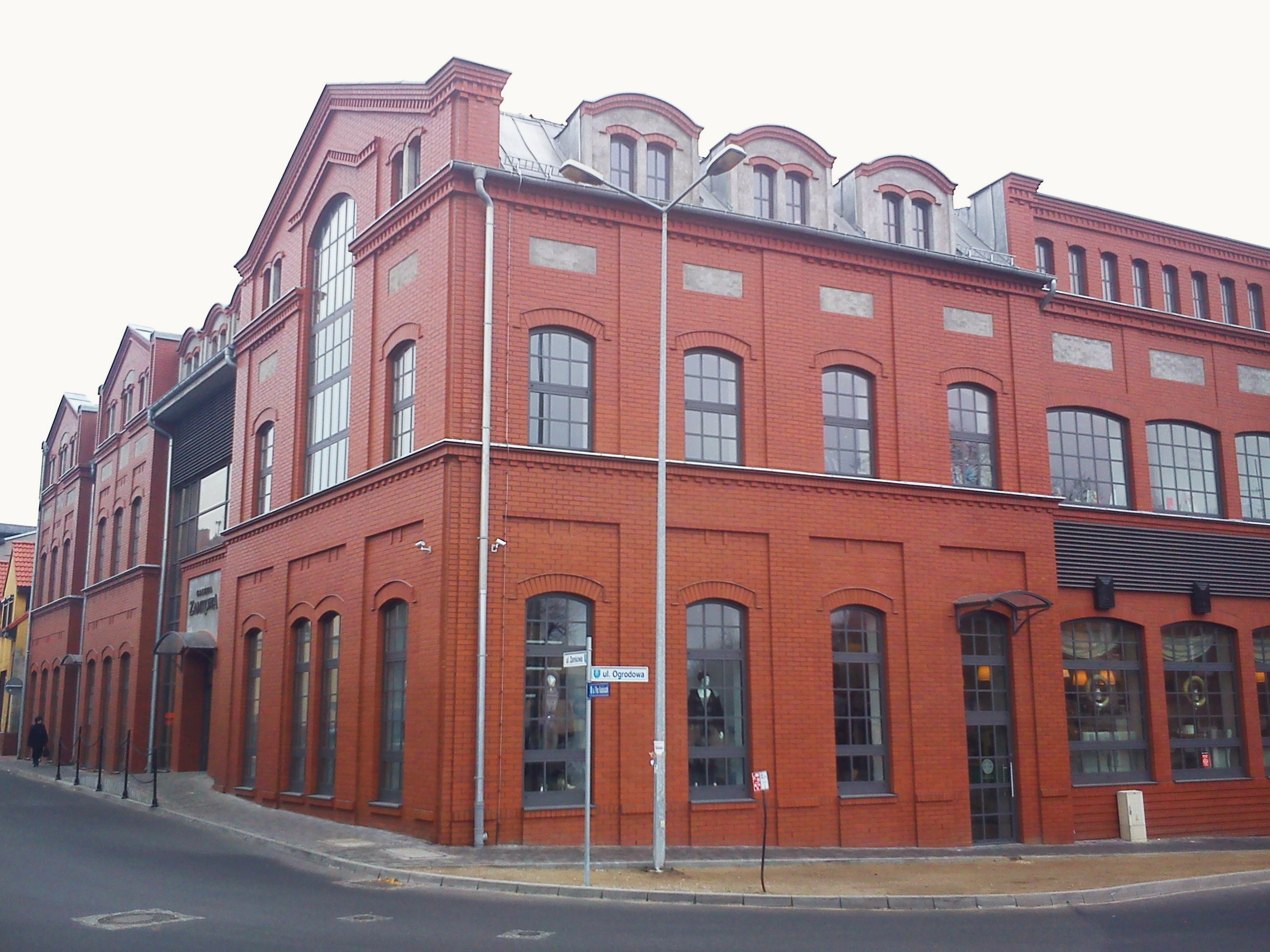
Shopping mall

== Notable people ==
- Agnieszka (Lipska) Baranowska (1819–1890), Polish playwright and poet, wrote several plays for this town's local theater
- Moses Samuel Zuckermandl (1836–1917), Czech-German rabbi, lived here
- Stefan Pawlicki (1839–1916), Polish Catholic priest, philosopher, historian of philosophy; lived here
- Teodor Jeske-Choiński (1854–1920), Polish intellectual, writer and historian, literature critic
- Hugo Leichtentritt (1874–1951), German-Jewish musicologist and composer, born here
- Emil Jarrow (Javorzynski) (1876–1959), world touring vaudeville magician and comedian, born here
- Hanna Suchocka (born 1946), first female Prime Minister of Poland, born here
- Maciej Piaszczyński (born 1989), Polish international speedway rider, born here

== International relations ==
=== Twin towns — Sister cities ===
Pleszew is twinned with:

- Morlanwelz
- Spangenberg (1997)
- Saint-Pierre-d'Oléron

== See also ==
- Gmina Pleszew
- Pleszew County
- Kreis Pleschen, Posen
- Pleszówka
