= Józef Krzymiński =

Polish physician, politician (1858–1940)

Józef Krzymiński (1 March 1858, Kaleje - 20 October 1940) was a Polish physician, social and political activist, and a member of parliament. In March 1940, he was arrested by the Nazi occupation authorities and died in a concentration camp close to Inowrocław on 20 October 1940.
