= Kreis Schwerin an der Warthe =

Coordinates: 52°35′33″N 15°30′00″E

Location of Kreis Schwerin (1910)

Kreis Schwerin an der Warthe (Polish: Powiat skwierzyński) was a district in Prussia, first in the southern administrative Region of Posen within the Prussian Province of Posen (until 1920), then within the Province of the Frontier March of Posen-West Prussia (until 1 October 1938) and at last as part of the administrative Region of Frankfurt within the Province of Brandenburg (until 1945). It presently lies in the western part of Polish region of Lubusz Voivodeship.

== History ==
The district was formed in 1887 from parts of the Kreis Birnbaum. After the First World War, Kreis Schwerin and few more districts belonged to the truncated remnant of the province of Posen remaining with the Free State of Prussia, Germany. Together with Kreis Bomst and Kreis Meseritz, the Kreis Schwerin formed a western territorial exclave of Posen-West Prussia. The district capital of Schwerin an der Warthe (now Skwierzyna), was distinguished from Schwerin in Mecklenburg by the name of the Warthe river, upon which it is located. When the Posen-West Prussia province was dissolved in 1938 the bulk of its territory, anyway neighbouring Pomerania, was annexed to that province, whereas its western exclave became part of the province of Brandenburg.

== Demographics ==
The district had a German majority with a significant Polish minority.

Ethnolinguistic structure of Kreis Schwerin
	Population	German		Polish / Bilingual / Other	
1905	21,840	20,145	92.2%	1,695	7.8%
1910	21,620	19,729	91.3%	1,891	8.7%
