= Polish Socialist Party of the Prussian Partition =

Former Polish political party

The Polish Socialist Party of the Prussian Partition, sometimes Polish Socialist Party in Prussia (Polish: Polska Partia Socjalistyczna Zaboru Pruskiego; German: Polnische Sozialistische Partei in Preußen) was a Polish political party.

The party was founded in 10 September 1893 in Berlin. From 1906 to 1912, the party had formal links with the Social Democratic Party of Germany. Following the restoration of Polish statehood in 1919, the party merged with the Polish Socialist Party.

== Notable members ==
- Marcin Kasprzak
