= 1903 German federal election =

- 16 June 1903

All 397 seats in the Reichstag 199 seats needed for a majority
- Registered: 12,531,248 (▲9.53%)
- Turnout: 76.08% (▲8.02pp)
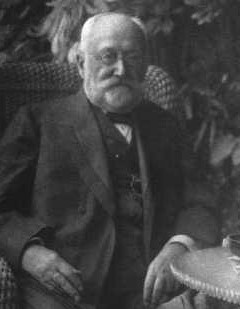

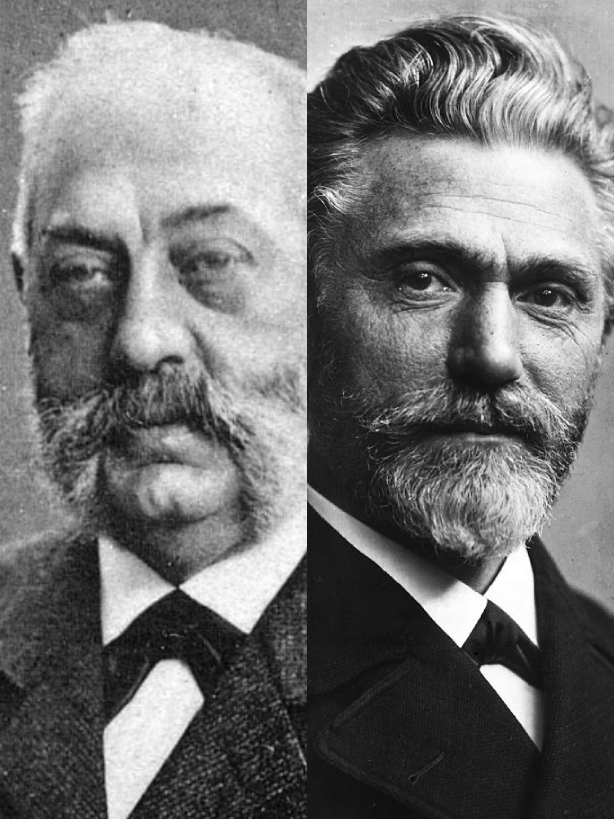

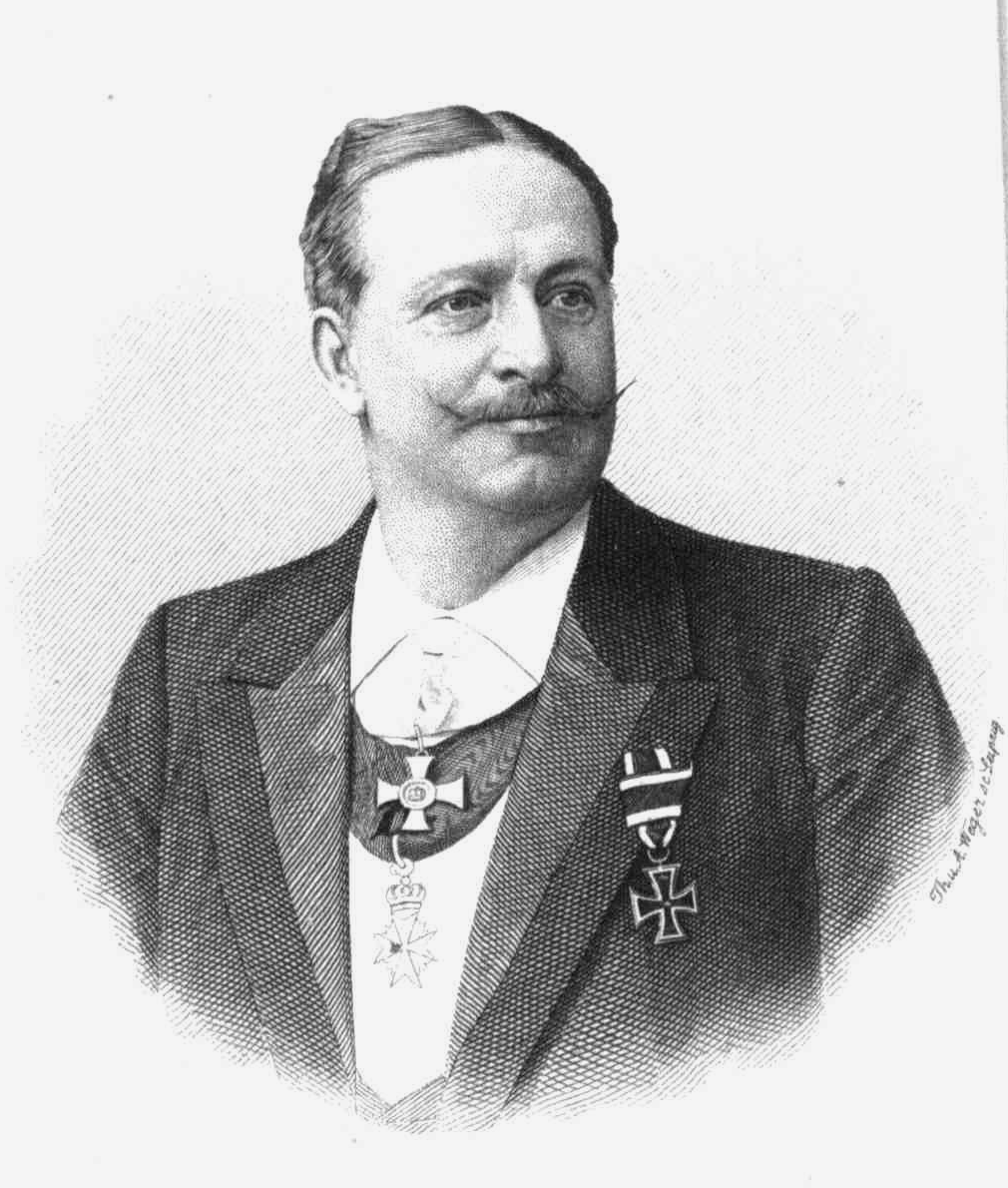

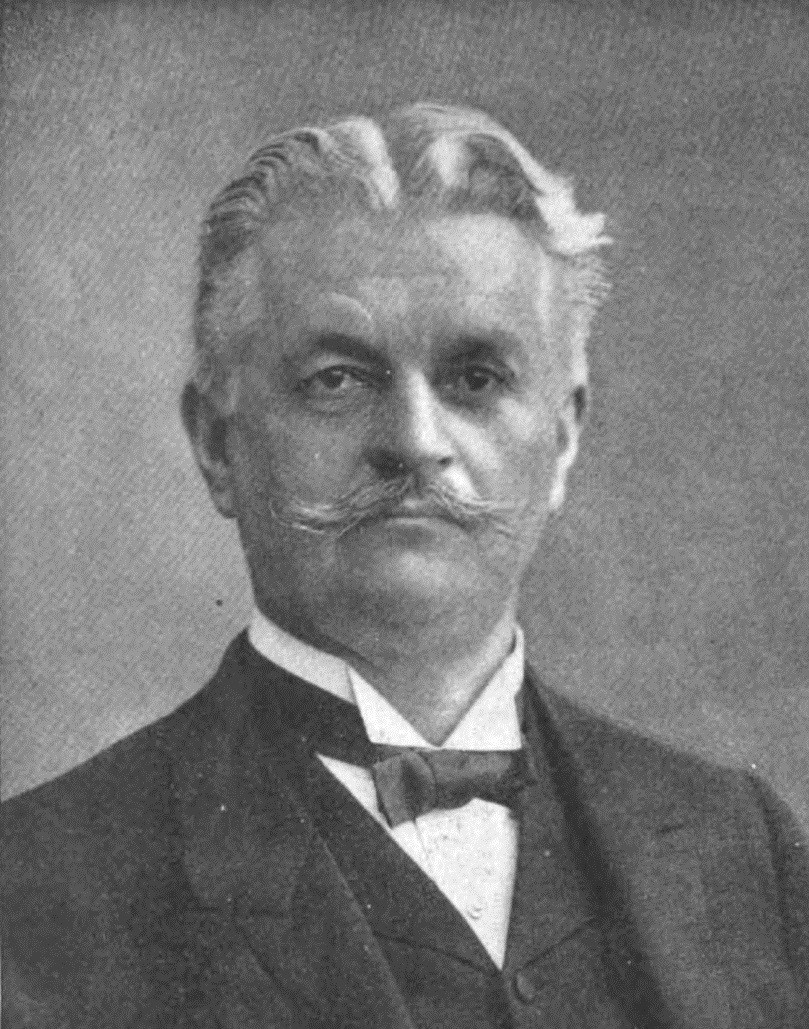

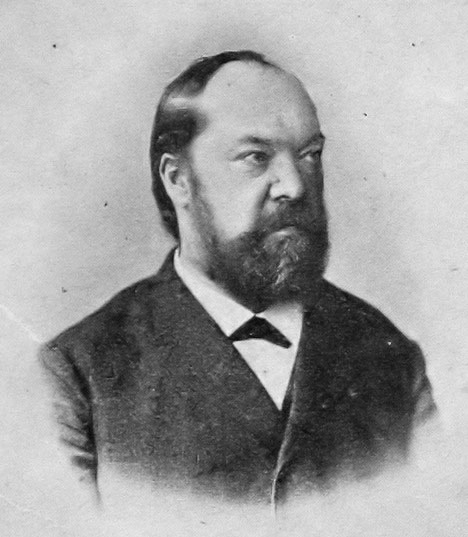
	First party	Second party	Third party
Leader	Franz von Ballestrem	Paul Singer & August Bebel	Otto von Manteuffel
Party	Centre	SPD	DKP
Last election	18.76%, 102 seats	27.18%, 56 seats	10.71%, 53 seats
Seats won	100	81	52
Seat change	▼2	▲25	▼1
Popular vote	1,875,292	3,010,771	901,415
Percentage	19.75%	31.71%	9.49%
Swing	▲0.99pp	▲4.53pp	▼1.22pp
	Fourth party	Fifth party	Sixth party
			DRP
Leader	Ernst Bassermann	Eugen Richter
Party	NLP	FVP	DRP
Last election	12.86%, 48 seats	7.20%, 29 seats	4.35%, 22 seats
Seats won	50	21	21
Seat change	▲2	▼8	▼1
Popular vote	1,301,473	536,879	336,617
Percentage	13.71%	5.65%	3.54%
Swing	▲0.85pp	▼1.55pp	▼0.81pp
- Results by constituency
President of the Reichstag before election
Franz von Ballestrem
Centre
President of the Reichstag after election
Franz von Ballestrem
Centre

Federal elections were held in Germany on 16 June 1903. Despite the Social Democratic Party (SPD) receiving a clear plurality of votes, the Centre Party remained the largest party in the Reichstag after winning 100 of the 397 seats, whilst the SPD won only 81. Voter turnout was 76.1%. The SPD benefited by being the only party fully opposed to the government's agricultural tariff, which increased the price of food.

== Results ==
Graph of the party split among 397 seats.
Party	Votes	%	+/–	Seats	+/–
Social Democratic Party	3,010,771	31.71	+4.53	81	+25
Centre Party	1,875,292	19.75	+0.99	100	−2
National Liberal Party	1,301,473	13.71	+0.85	50	+2
German Conservative Party	901,415	9.49	−1.22	52	−1
Free-minded People's Party	536,879	5.65	−1.55	21	−8
German Reich Party	336,617	3.54	−0.81	21	−1
Free-minded Union	233,229	2.46	−0.06	8	−4
Independent Polish	164,742	1.73	−0.45	8	0
German Agrarian League	145,025	1.53	+0.20	5	−1
German Reform Party	138,344	1.46	New	6	New
Alsace-Lorraine parties	126,276	1.33	−0.19	11	0
Polish People's Party	104,246	1.10	+1.00	5	+5
German-Hanoverian Party	100,538	1.06	−0.30	7	−2
German People's Party	82,007	0.86	−0.51	5	−3
Bavarian Peasants' League	65,815	0.69	−1.00	2	−2
German Social Party	59,291	0.62	New	3	New
Other agrarians	45,870	0.48	+0.36	1	1
Polish National Party	44,175	0.47	New	1	New
Christian Social Party	40,744	0.43	−0.20	2	+1
Polish Court Party	34,621	0.36	−0.51	2	−4
National-Social Group	33,655	0.35	0.00	1	+1
Alsatian liberals	25,677	0.27	+0.05	2	+1
Independent conservatives	22,490	0.24	+0.18	1	−2
Danish Party	14,843	0.16	−0.04	1	0
Independent liberals	9,808	0.10	−0.50	0	−3
Alsace Liberal Group	9,166	0.10	+0.07	1	+1
Middle Class parties	6,909	0.07	+0.03	0	0
Independent anti-semites	6,474	0.07	−0.23	0	−2
Lithuanian Party	6,012	0.06	−0.05	0	−1
Other conservatives	674	0.01	−0.05	0	0
Others	11,884	0.13	−0.05	0	0
Unknown	625	0.01	0.00	0	0
Total	9,495,587	100.00	–	397	0
Valid votes	9,495,587	99.60			
Invalid/blank votes	38,227	0.40			
Total votes	9,533,814	100.00			
Registered voters/turnout	12,531,248	76.08			
Source: Wahlen in Deutschland

=== Alsace-Lorraine ===
Party	Votes	%	+/–	Seats	+/–
Alsace-Lorraine Land Party	69,011	24.44	−4.90	6	0
Social Democratic Party	68,267	24.17	+1.46	0	−1
Lorraine independent conservatives	44,884	15.89	+4.68	4	+1
Alsatian Liberals	25,677	9.09	+1.71	2	+1
Centre Party	20,034	7.09	New	0	New
Independent conservatives	12,060	4.27	−1.62	0	−1
German Reich Party	9,874	3.50	−0.60	1	0
Alsace Liberal Group	9,166	3.25	+2.32	1	+1
Alsace-Lorraine protesters	8,163	2.89	+0.17	1	0
Free-minded Union	7,368	2.61	+2.47	0	0
Clericals	4,218	1.49	−4.68	0	−1
National Liberal Party	1,417	0.50	−3.06	0	0
Independent liberals	1,327	0.47	−2.54	0	0
Others	947	0.34	+0.02	0	0
Total	282,413	100.00	–	15	0
Valid votes	282,413	98.09			
Invalid/blank votes	5,501	1.91			
Total votes	287,914	100.00			
Registered voters/turnout	372,327	77.33			
Source: Wahlen in Deutschland
