= Kreis Krotoschin =

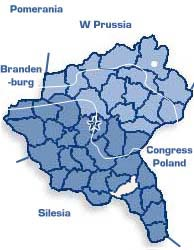

Kreis Krotoschin (Polish: Powiat krotoszyński) was a county in the southern administrative district of Posen, in the Prussian province of Posen. It presently lies in the southern part of Polish region of Greater Poland Voivodeship.

== Civil registry offices ==
In 1905, these civil registry offices (German: Standesamt) served the following towns in Kreis Krotoschin:
