= Kreis Obornik =

Coordinates: 52°39′00″N 16°49′00″E

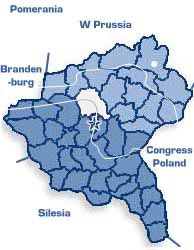

Kreis Obornik (Polish: Powiat obornicki) was a district in Regierungsbezirk Posen in the Prussian province of Posen until 1919. Its territory presently lies in the north-western part of Polish region of Greater Poland Voivodeship.

== Demographics ==
Population of Kreis Obornik
	1831		1861	
Germans	14,849	41.9%	22,351	47.7%
Poles	20,598	58.1%	24,490	52.3%
Total	35,447		46,841	

== Civil registry offices ==
In 1905, these civil registry offices (German: Standesamt) served the following town in Kreis Obornik:

- Obornik
