= Kreis Schroda =

Coordinates: 52°13′31″N 17°16′18″E

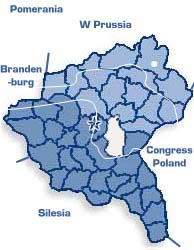

Kreis Schroda (Polish: Powiat średzki) was a county in Prussia and later the German Empire, after 1848 it was located the Prussian province of Posen. Its regional government was located Schroda. It presently lies in the southern part of the Polish region of Greater Poland Voivodeship.

== History ==
=== Prussia and German Empire ===
Established in 1818, the district of Schroda oversaw a few towns and had its administraition located to its namesake town of Schroda. It was inside the Province of Posen, and became part of the German Empire in 1871. Its land was shrunk in 1900, but would remain a district of the German Empire until the Treaty of Versailles, giving it to Poland.

=== World War 2 ===
During the German Occupation of Poland, the Germans formed the administrative unit called Landkreis Schroda, until the Red Army liberated Poland in January 1945.
