= Districts of Prussia =

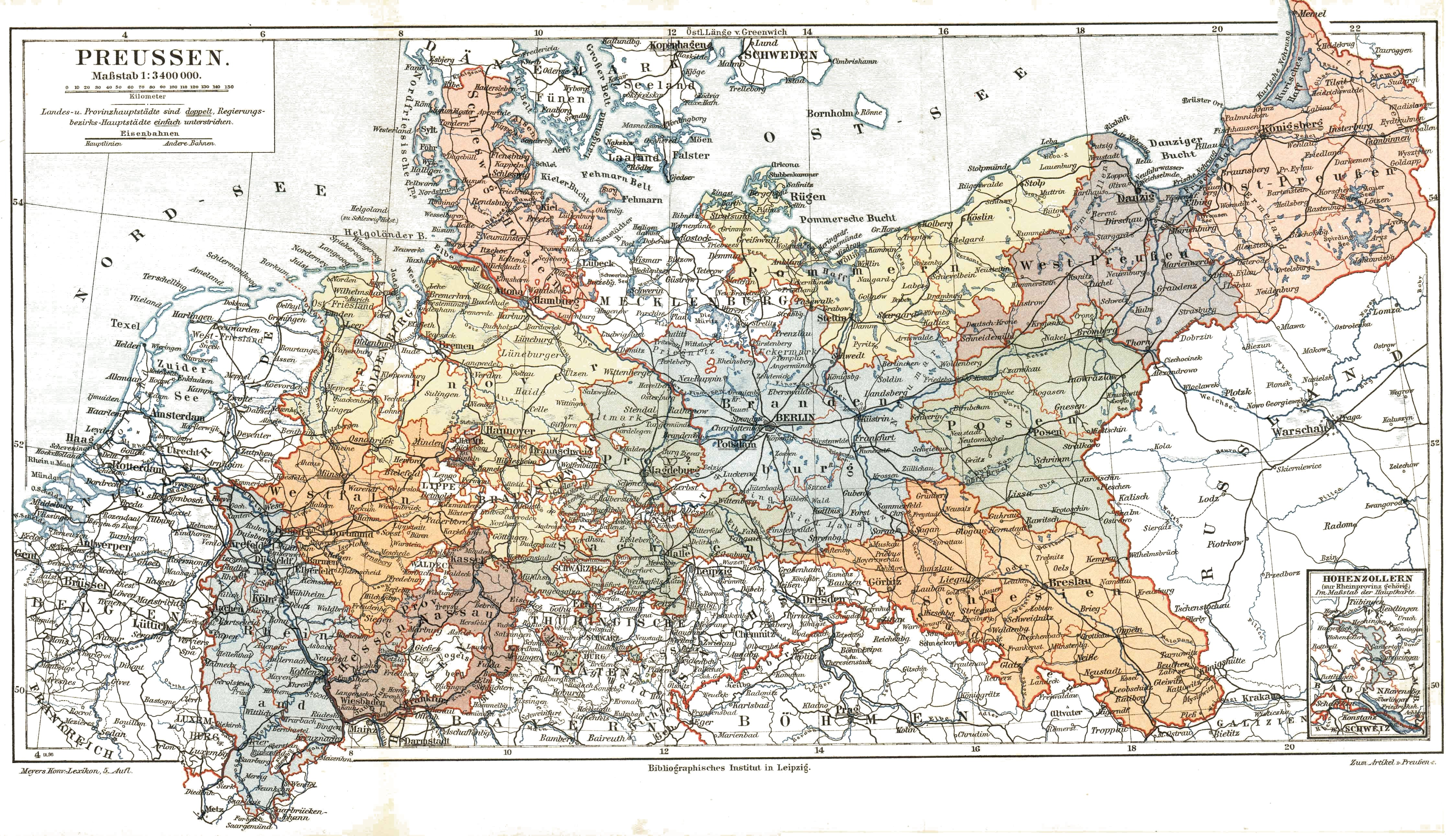
Prussian provinces about 1900

Prussian districts (German: Kreise, lit. 'circles') were administrative units in the former Kingdom of Prussia, part of the German Empire from 1871 to 1918 (26 units), and its successor state, the Free State of Prussia, similar to a county or a shire. They were established in the course of the Stein-Hardenberg Reforms from 1815 to 1818 at an intermediate level, between the higher provinces and the government districts (Regierungsbezirke), and the lower municipal governments (Gemeinden). Then part of a modern and highly effective public administration structure, they served as a model for the present-day districts of Germany

In the aftermath of World War I, the Prussian districts of Eupen and Malmedy (Belgium) were annexed by Belgium in 1925, thereby causing the presence of a German-speaking minority.

== Administration ==
After the Napoleonic Wars and the 1815 Congress of Vienna, the Prussian lands were re-arranged into ten provinces, three of them—East Prussia, West Prussia and the Grand Duchy of Posen—beyond the borders of the German Confederation. The provinces were internally divided into up to six Regierungsbezirke and further into the districts on local level, headed by a Landrat administrator. The districts usually took the name of their capital (Kreisstadt), seat of the administrative office (Landratsamt). A typical district had a rough diameter of 20 to 40 miles (32 to 64 km), in order to ensure that even the remotest villages could be reached by carriage within a day, though few were circular in shape. In some areas, larger districts were split into two smaller districts or were resized with neighboring ones.

Larger cities usually retained their self-administration according to traditional German town law and formed exempt urban districts (Stadtkreise) comparable to independent cities. Often these cities also served as the administrative seat responsible for the smaller towns and villages incorporated into the surrounding rural districts, which then were called (Landkreise) for the purpose of differentiation (e.g. Stadtkreis and Landkreis Königsberg). The number of urban districts increased in the course of the Industrial Revolution and the following urbanization from the 1830s onwards.

== See also ==
- Prussia
