= Greater Poland =

Historical region of west-central Poland

Greater Poland Wielkopolska
- Historical region
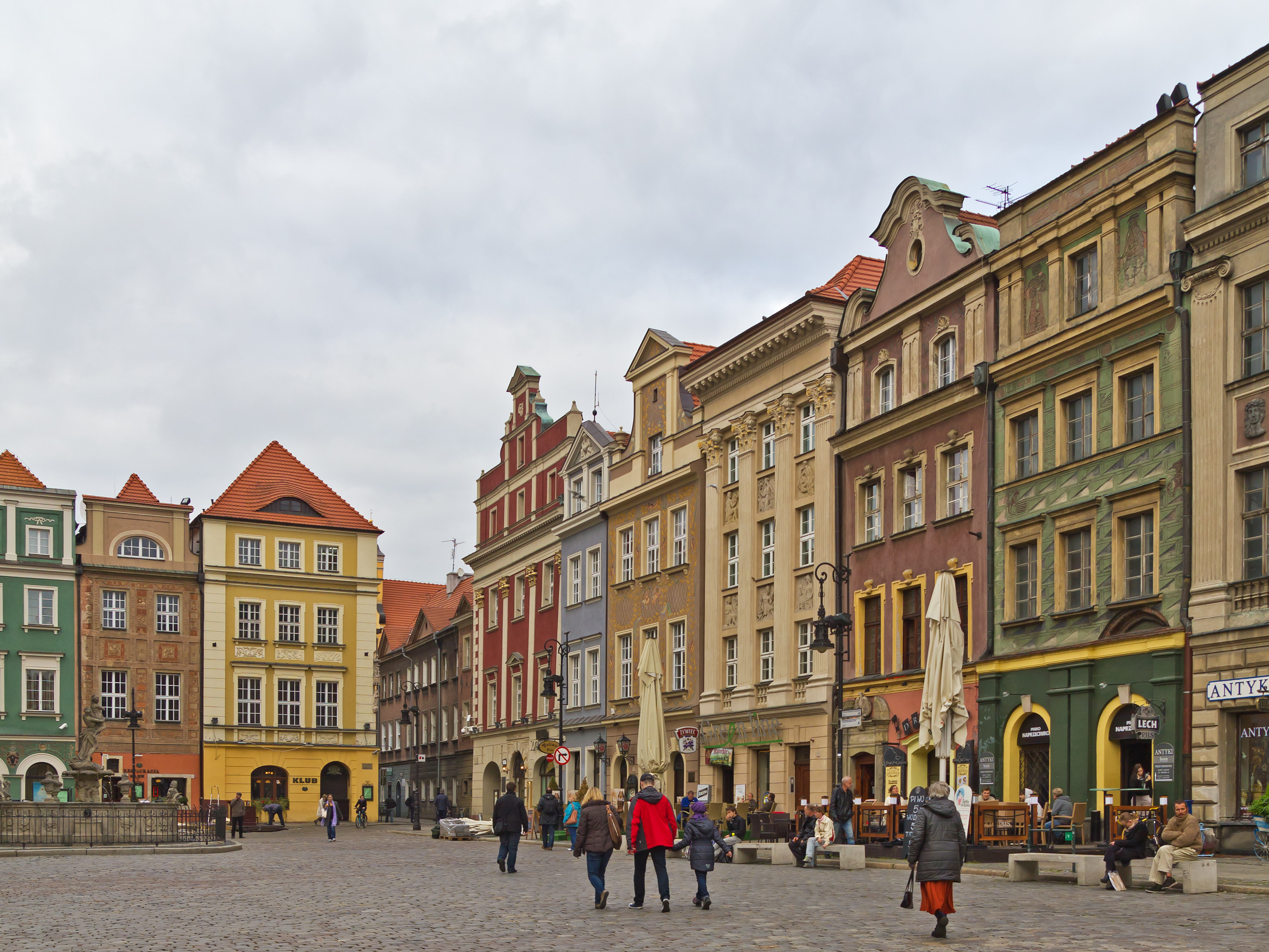
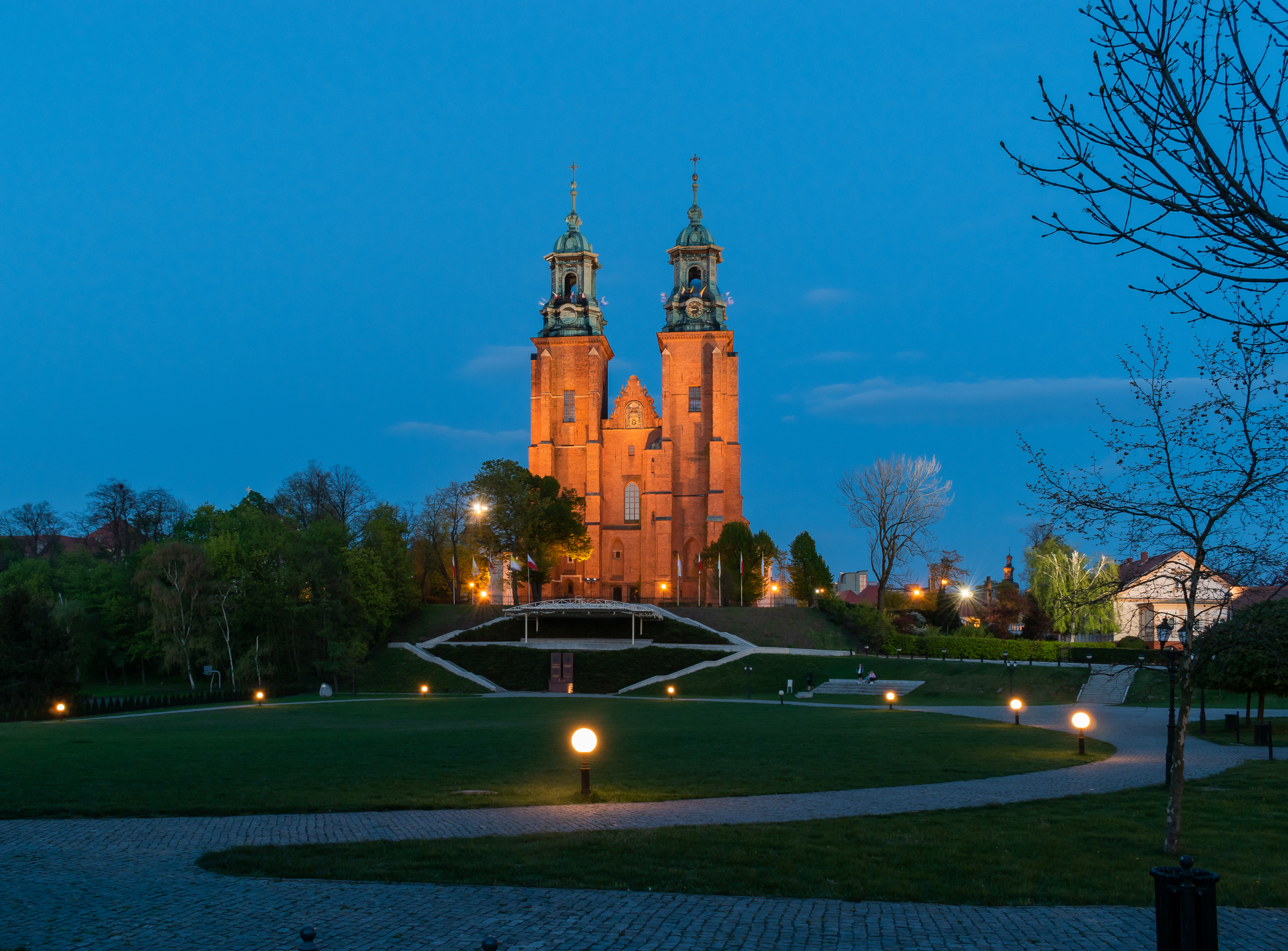
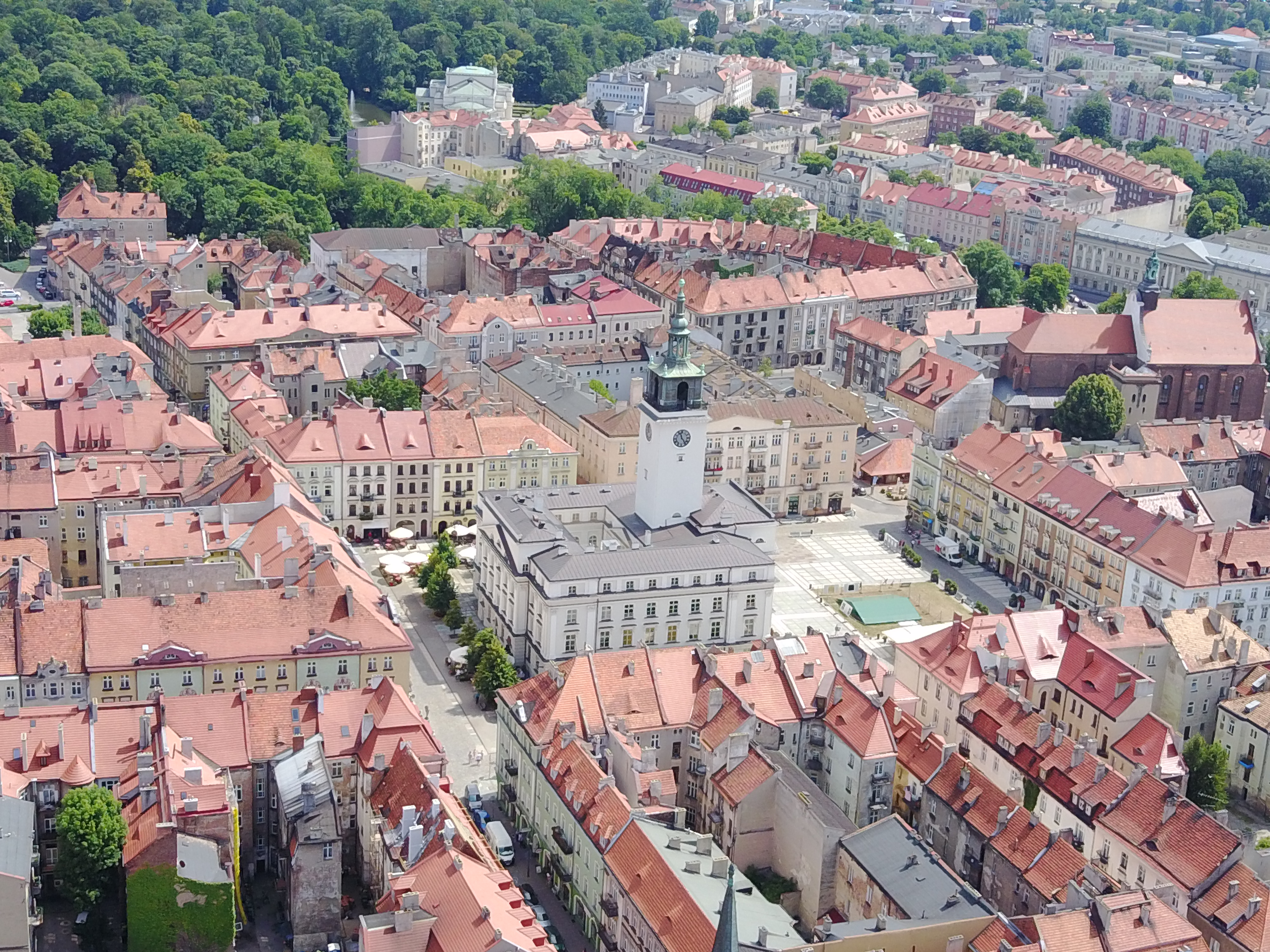
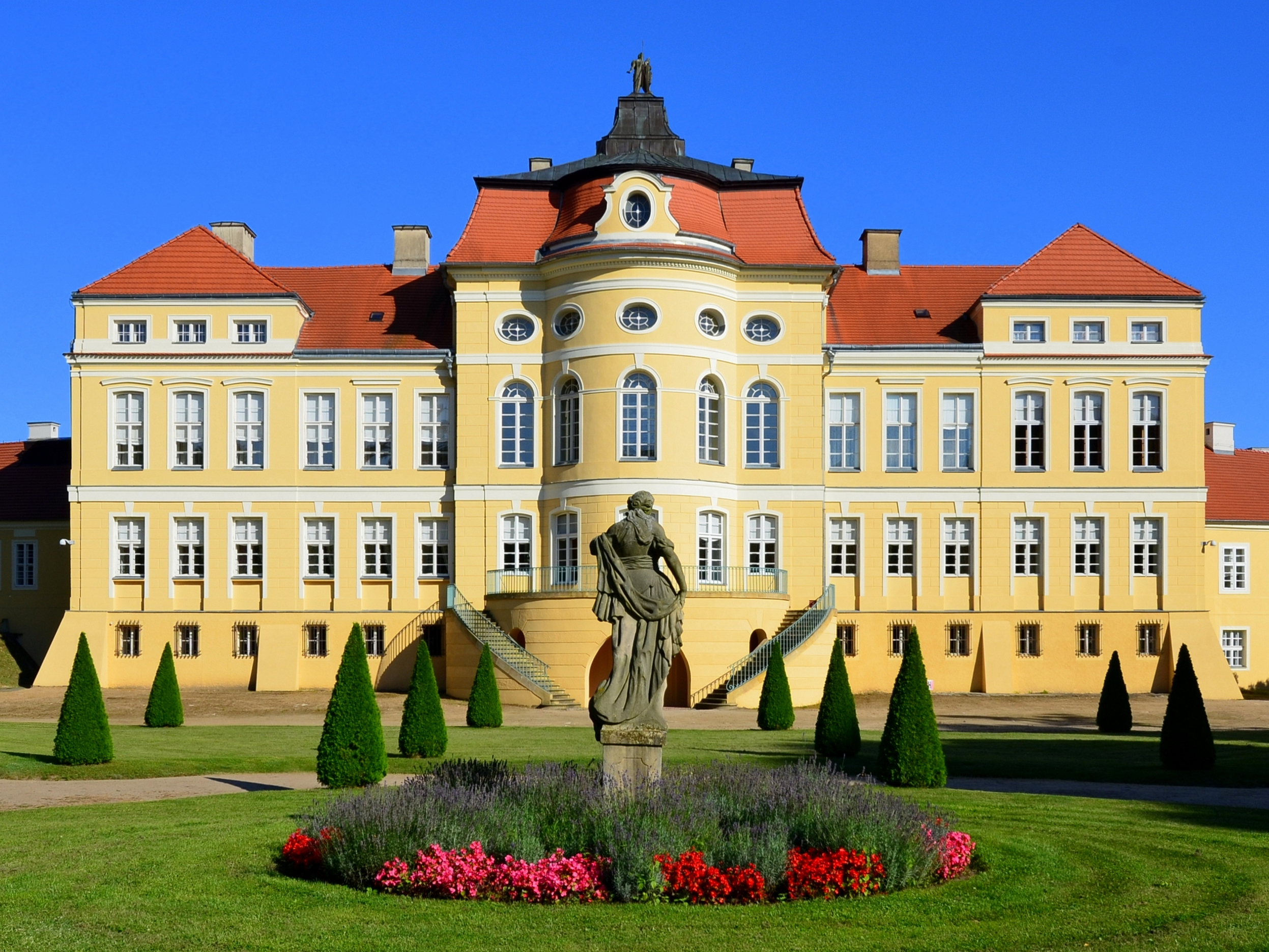
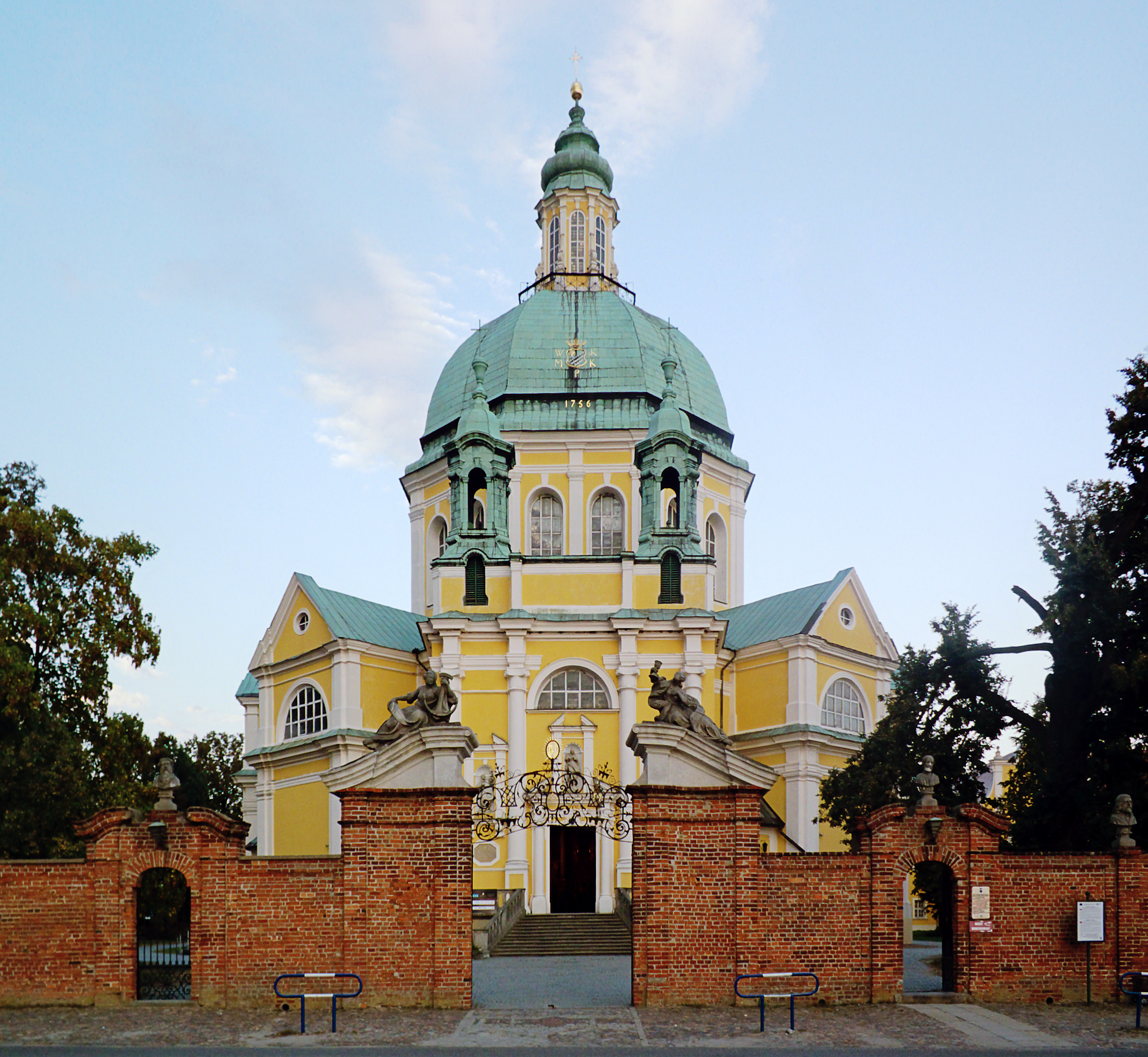
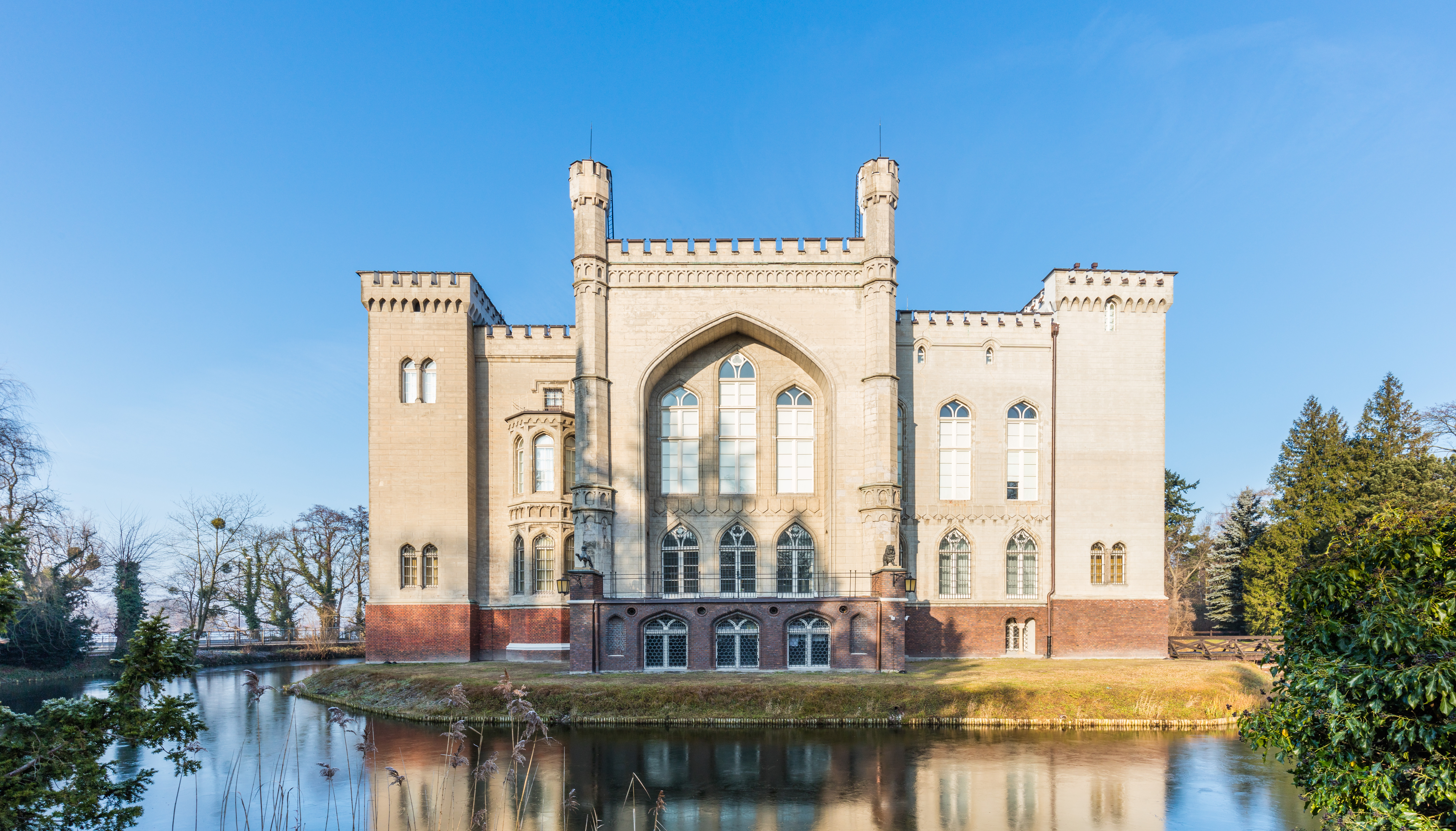
- Poznań Old Town Gniezno Cathedral Kalisz Old Town Raczyński Palace in Rogalin Basilica on the Holy Mountain in Głogówko Kórnik Castle

- Coat of arms

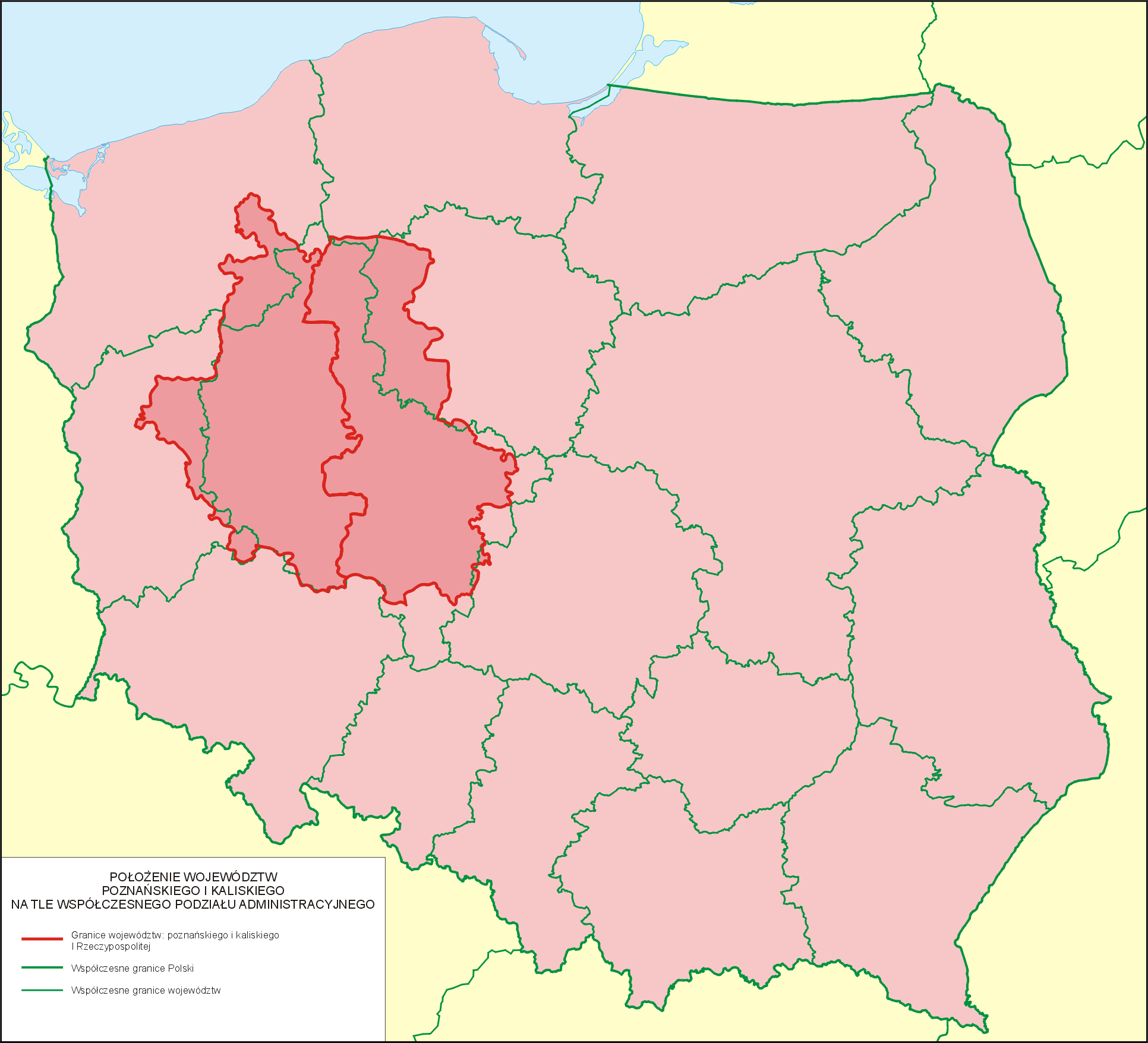
- The proper Greater Poland (shown in darker pink) within Poland
- Country: Poland
- Seat: Gniezno, Poznań, Kalisz
- Time zone: UTC+1 (CET)
  - Summer (DST): UTC+2 (CEST)
- Primary airport: Poznań–Ławica Airport

Greater Poland, often known by its Polish name Wielkopolska (Polish: [vjɛlkɔˈpɔlska]; Latin: Polonia Maior), is a Polish historical region of west-central Poland. Its chief and largest city is Poznań followed by Kalisz, the oldest city in Poland.

The boundaries of Greater Poland have varied somewhat throughout history. Since the Late Middle Ages, Wielkopolska proper has been split into the Poznań and Kalisz voivodeships. In the wider sense, it also encompassed Sieradz, Łęczyca, Brześć Kujawski and Inowrocław voivodeships (the last two known as Kuyavian) which were situated further east, and the Santok Land, located to the northwest. The region in the proper sense roughly coincides with the present-day Greater Poland Voivodeship (Polish: województwo wielkopolskie).

Like all the historical regions of Poland (e.g. Pomerania, Warmia, Silesia, Mazovia, and Lesser Poland), the Greater Poland region possesses its own folk costumes, architecture, cuisine, that make the region touristically and culturally interesting.

== Name ==
Due to the fact that Greater Poland was the settlement area of the Polans and the core of the early Polish state, the region was at times simply called "Poland" (Latin Polonia). The more specific name is first recorded in the Latin form Polonia Maior in 1257 and in Polish w Wielkej Polszcze in 1449. Its original meaning was the Older Poland to contrast with Lesser Poland (Polish Małopolska, Latin Polonia Minor), a region in south-eastern Poland with its capital at Kraków that later became the main centre of the state.

== Geography ==
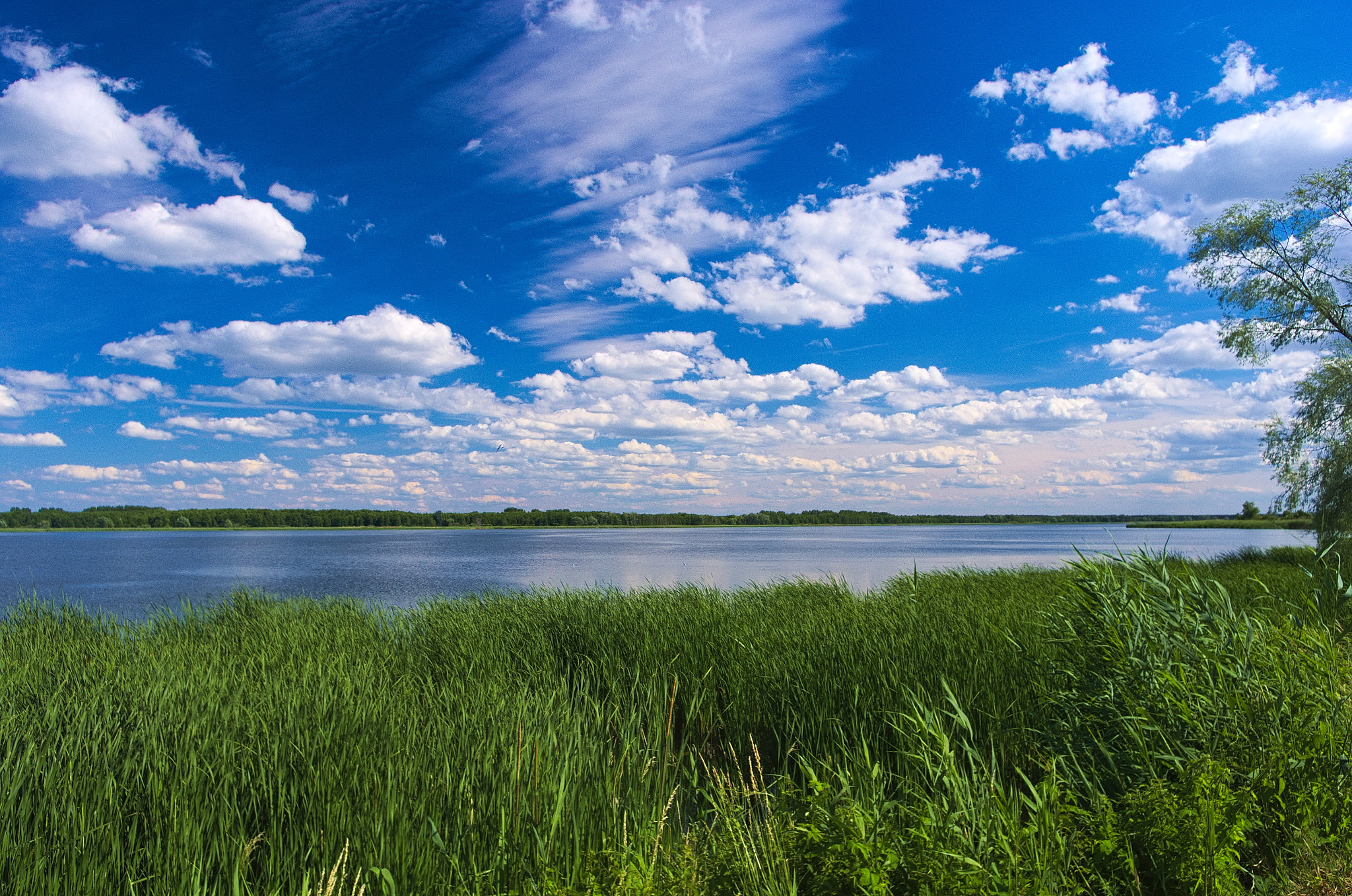
Berzyńskie Lake near Wolsztyn

Greater Poland comprises much of the area drained by the Warta River and its tributaries, including the Noteć River. The region is distinguished from Lesser Poland with the lowland landscape, and from both Lesser Poland and Mazovia with its numerous lakes. In the strict meaning, it covers an area of about 33,000 square kilometres (13,000 sq mi), and has a population of 3.5 million. In the wider sense, it has almost 60,000 square kilometres (23,000 sq mi), and 7 million inhabitants.

The region's main metropolis is Poznań, near the centre of the region, on the Warta. Other cities are Kalisz to the south-east, Konin to the east, Piła to the north, Ostrów Wielkopolski to the south-east, Gniezno (the earliest capital of Poland) to the north-east, and Leszno to the south-west.

An area of 75.84 square kilometres (29.28 sq mi) of forest and lakeland south of Poznań is designated the Wielkopolska National Park (Wielkopolski Park Narodowy), established in 1957. The region also contains part of Drawa National Park, and several designated Landscape Parks. For example, the Rogalin Landscape Park is famous for about 2000 monumental oak trees growing on the flood plain of the river Warta, among numerous ox-bow lakes.

== Subregions ==
Greater Poland contains the following subregions:

- Kalisz Region (Kaliskie) in the east, named after the historical capital and largest city Kalisz. Other main cities: Konin, Ostrów Wielkopolski, Gniezno.
  - Pałuki in the north-east. Historical capital: Żnin. Largest town: Wągrowiec.
- Poznań Region (Poznańskie) in the west, named after the historical capital and largest city Poznań. Other main cities: Piła, Leszno.
  - Wschowa Land (Ziemia wschowska) in the south-west, named after the historical capital and largest town Wschowa.
  - Wałcz Land (Ziemia wałecka) in the north, named after the historical capital and largest town Wałcz.
  - Biskupizna in the south. Historical capital and largest town: Krobia.
- Krajna in the north-east. Historical capital: Nakło nad Notecią. Largest city: Piła.
- Santok Land (Ziemia santocka) in the north-west, named after the historical capital Santok. Largest city: Gorzów Wielkopolski.

== History ==
=== Medieval and early modern period ===
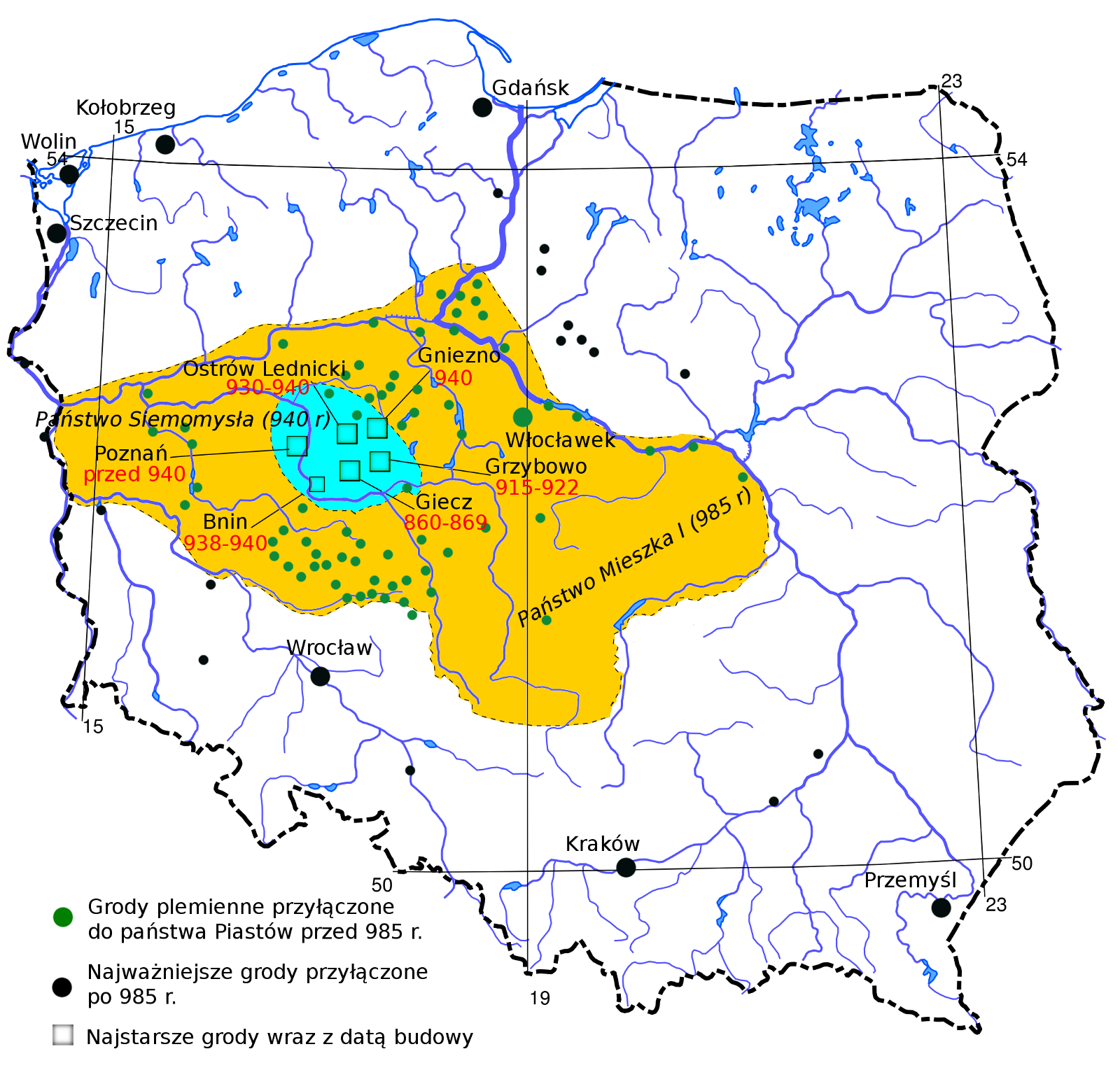
Polan strongholds during the reign of Mieszko I, mid-10th century

Greater Poland formed the heart of the 10th-century early Polish state, sometimes being called the "cradle of Poland". Poznań and Gniezno were early centres of royal power and the seats of Poland's first Catholic diocese, est. in Poznań in 968, and the first archdiocese, est. in Gniezno in 1000, but following devastation of the region by pagan rebellion in the 1030s, and the invasion of Bretislaus I of Bohemia in 1038, the capital was moved by Casimir I the Restorer from Gniezno to Kraków.

In the Testament of Bolesław III Wrymouth, which initiated the period of fragmentation of Poland (1138–1320), the western part of Greater Poland (including Poznań) was granted to Mieszko III the Old. The eastern part, with Gniezno and Kalisz, was part of the Seniorate Province centered in Kraków, granted to Władysław II. However, for most of the period the two parts were under a single ruler, and were known as the Duchy of Greater Poland (although at times there were separately ruled duchies of Poznań, Gniezno, Kalisz and Ujście). It was one of the leading and fastest developing regions of Poland, with municipal rights modeled after Poznań and Kalisz becoming the basis of municipal form of government for several towns in the region, as two of five local Polish variants of medieval town rights. The region came under the control of Władysław I the Elbow-high in 1314, and thus became part of the reunited Poland of which Władyslaw was crowned king in 1320.

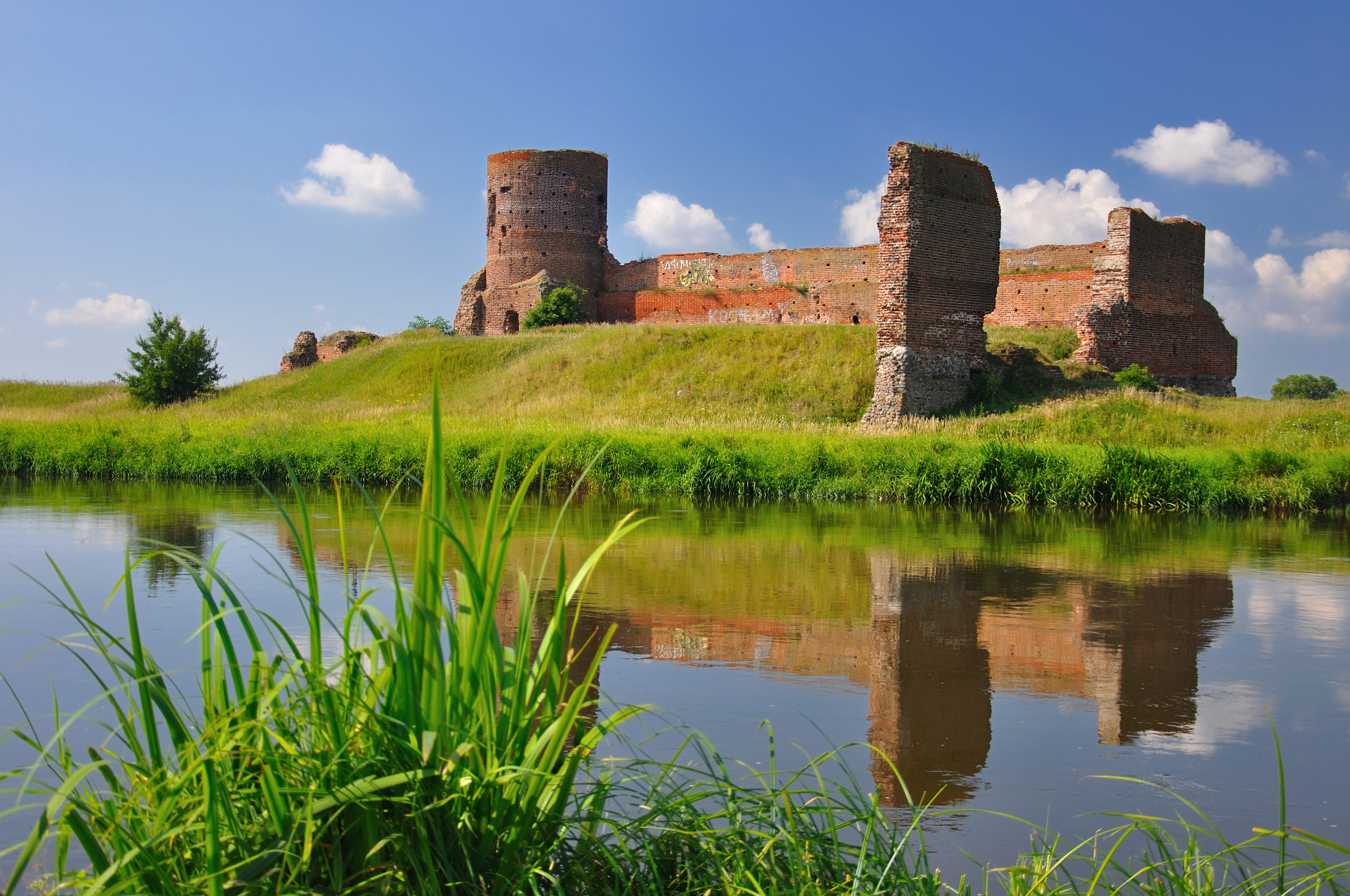
Ruins of Koło Castle on the banks of the Warta River

In 1264, Duke Bolesław the Pious issued the Statute of Kalisz in the region. It was a unique protective privilege for Jews during their persecution in Western Europe, which in the following centuries made Poland the destination of Jewish migration from other countries.

From the late 13th century, the region experienced first German invasions and occupations. In the late 13th century, the northwestern part of Greater Poland was occupied by the Margraviate of Brandenburg. In 1331, during the Polish–Teutonic War of 1326–1332, the Teutonic Knights invaded central and eastern Greater Poland, however, the Poles defeated the invaders at Kalisz and an indecisive battle was fought at Konin. The Teutonic Knights soon retreated. King Casimir III the Great regained parts of northwestern Greater Poland, including Drezdenko in 1365 and Wałcz, Czaplinek and Człopa in 1368. Poland still attempted to recover the remainder of Brandenburg-annexed northwestern Greater Poland, which in 1373 became part of the Bohemian (Czech) Crown, ruled by the House of Luxembourg. In 1402, Poland and the Luxembourgs reached an agreement, according to which Poland was to buy and re-incorporate the aforementioned territory, but eventually the Luxembourgs sold it to the Teutonic Order. Allied Poles and Czech Hussites captured several towns of Teutonic-held northwestern Greater Poland, including Dobiegniew and Strzelce Krajeńskie, during the Polish–Teutonic War of 1431–1435.

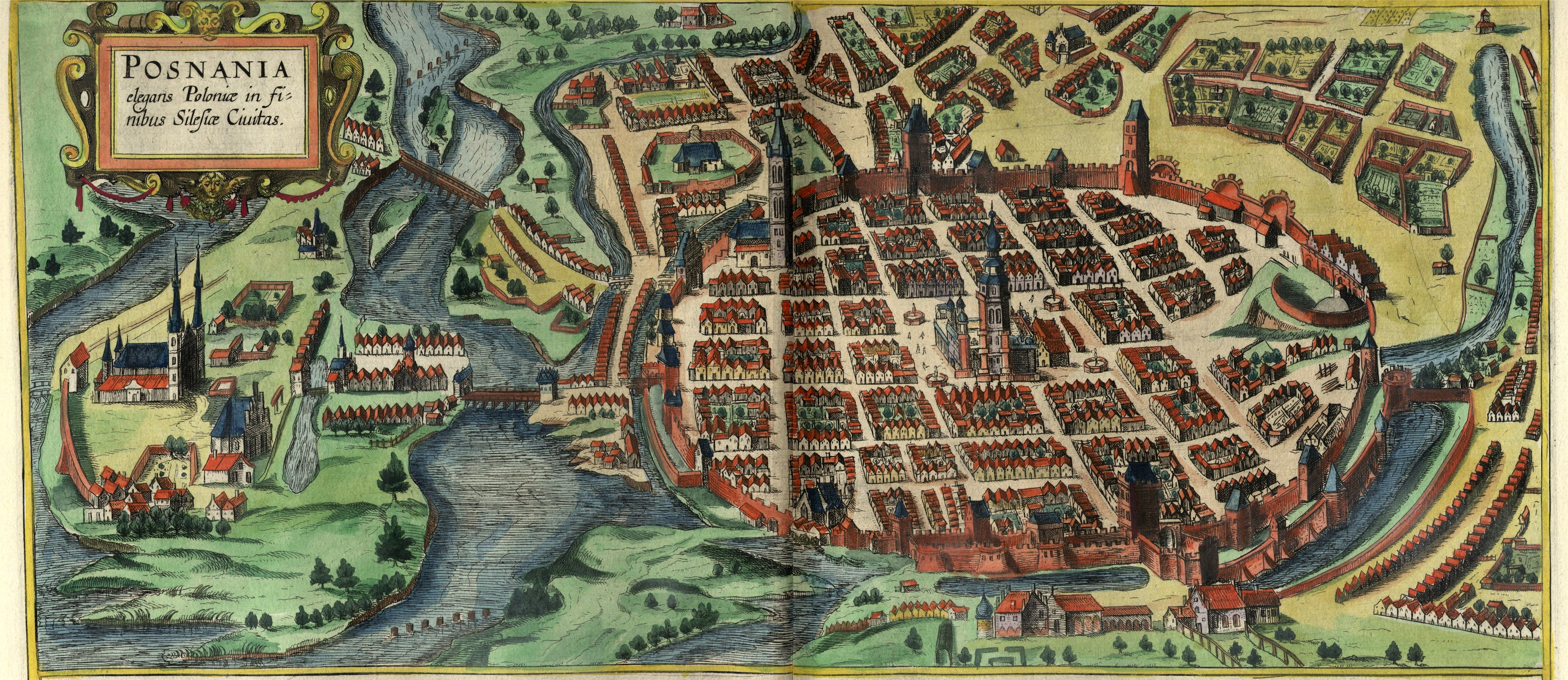
View of Poznań, c. 1617

In the reunited kingdom, and later in the Polish–Lithuanian Commonwealth, the country came to be divided into administrative units called voivodeships. In the case of the Greater Poland region these were Poznań Voivodeship and Kalisz Voivodeship. The Commonwealth also had larger subdivisions known as prowincja, one of which was named Greater Poland. However, this prowincja covered a larger area than the Greater Poland region itself, also taking in Masovia and Royal Prussia. (This division of Crown Poland into two entities called Greater and Lesser Poland had its roots in the Statutes of Casimir the Great of 1346–1362, where the laws of "Greater Poland" – the northern part of the country – were codified in the Piotrków statute, with those of "Lesser Poland" in the separate Wiślica statute.)

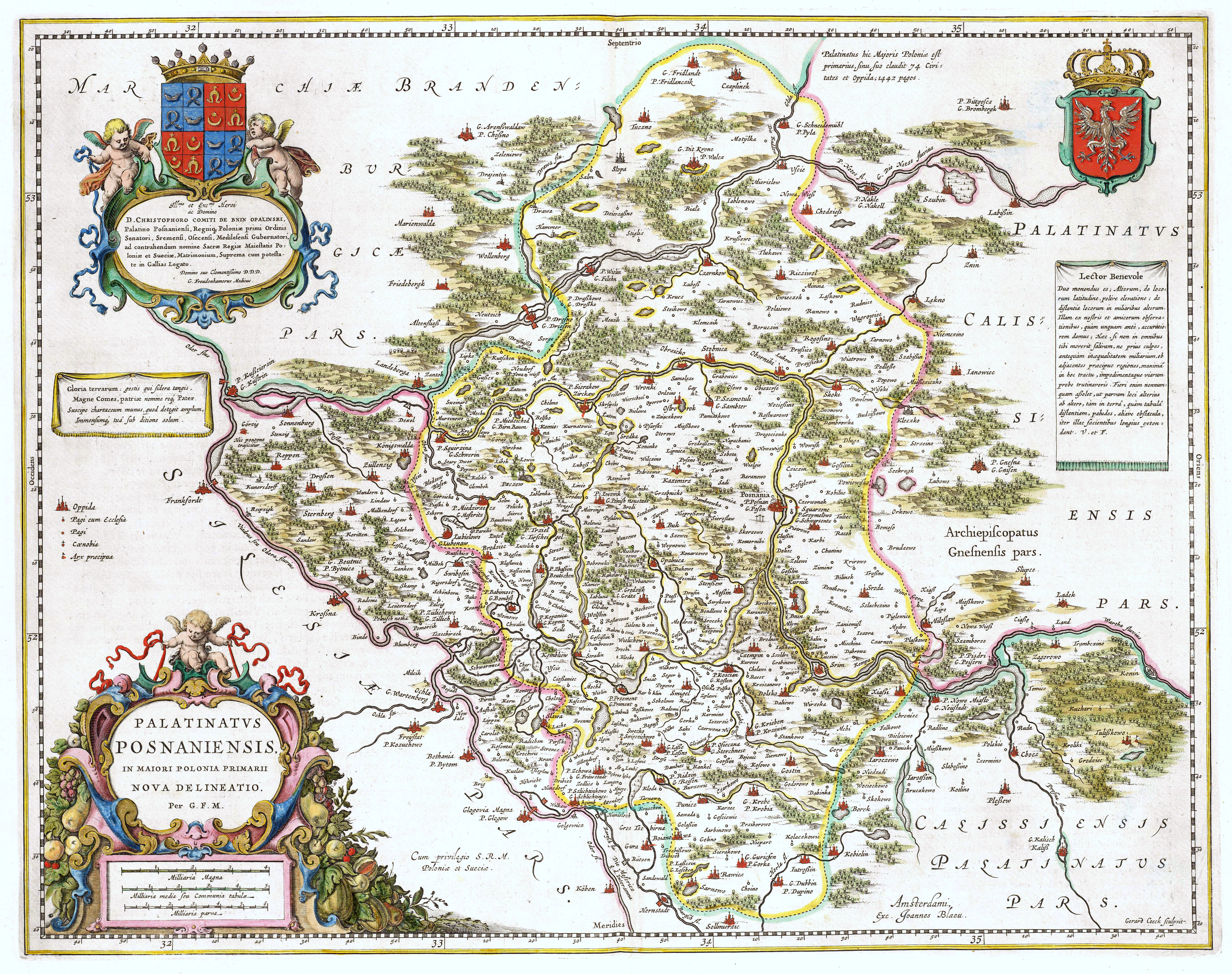
Poznań Voivodeship within the borders of the Polish–Lithuanian Commonwealth, 1664

Poznań, Łobżenica and Wschowa had important mints that struck Polish coins. In 1655, Greater Poland was invaded by Sweden, and several battles were fought in the region, including at Ujście, Kłecko and Kcynia.

In the 18th century kings Augustus II the Strong and Augustus III of Poland often resided in Wschowa, and sessions of the Senate of the Polish–Lithuanian Commonwealth were held there, thus the town being dubbed the "unofficial capital of Poland". In 1768 a new Gniezno Voivodeship was formed out of the northern part of Kalisz Voivodeship. However more far-reaching changes would come with the Partitions of Poland. In the first partition (1772), northern parts of Greater Poland along the Noteć (German Netze) were taken over by Prussia, becoming the Netze District. In the second partition (1793) the whole of Greater Poland was absorbed by Prussia, becoming part of the province of South Prussia. It remained so in spite of the first Greater Poland uprising (1794), part of the unsuccessful Kościuszko Uprising directed chiefly against Russia.

=== Partitions of Poland ===
More successful was the Greater Poland Uprising of 1806, which led to the bulk of Greater Poland becoming part of the Napoleonic Duchy of Warsaw (forming the Poznań Department and parts of the Kalisz and Bydgoszcz Departments), whereas the northwestern and northern outskirts remained part of Prussia. However, following the Congress of Vienna in 1815, Greater Poland was again partitioned, with the western part (including Poznań) going to Prussia. The eastern part (including Kalisz) joined the Russian-controlled Kingdom of Poland, where it formed the Kalisz Voivodeship until 1837, then the Kalisz Governorate (merged into the Warsaw Governorate between 1844 and 1867).

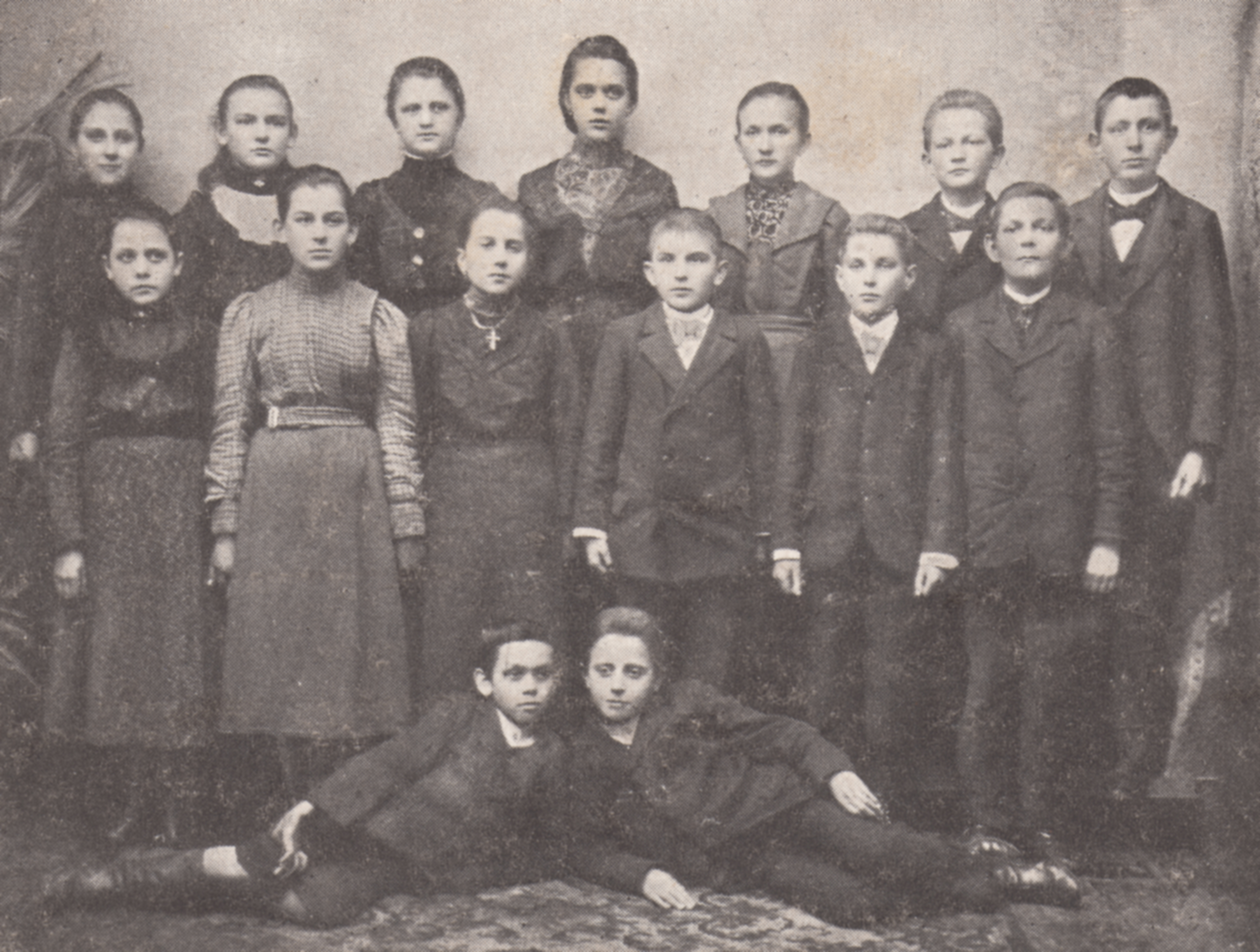
Children from Września who participated in the strike against Germanisation policies

Within the Prussian Partition, western Greater Poland became the Grand Duchy of Posen (Poznań), which theoretically held some autonomy. Following an unrealised uprising in 1846, and the more substantial but still unsuccessful uprising of 1848 (during the Spring of Nations), the Grand Duchy was replaced by the Province of Posen. The authorities made efforts to Germanize the region, particularly after the founding of Germany in 1871, and from 1886 onwards the Prussian Settlement Commission was active in increasing German land ownership in formerly Polish areas. The Germans imposed Germanisation and Kulturkampf policies, and the Poles organized resistance. In the early 20th century, the Września children strike against Germanisation started, which quickly spread to other places in Greater Poland and beyond, whereas Michał Drzymała with the Drzymała's wagon became a regional folk hero.

In the Russian Partition, Russification policies were enacted, and Polish resistance was also active. The largest uprisings in Russian-controlled eastern Greater Poland were the November Uprising of 1830–31 and January Uprising of 1863–64.

During World War I, Germany also occupied eastern Greater Poland, and in August 1914, the German Army carried out the destruction of Kalisz. Several German prisoner-of-war camps for Allied POWs, including Britons, French, Poles, Lithuanians, Latvians, Romanians and Russians, were operated in the region. Germany planned the annexation of eastern Greater Poland as part of the so-called "Polish Border Strip" and expulsion of its Polish inhabitants to make room for German colonization in accordance with the Lebensraum policy.

=== Interbellum ===
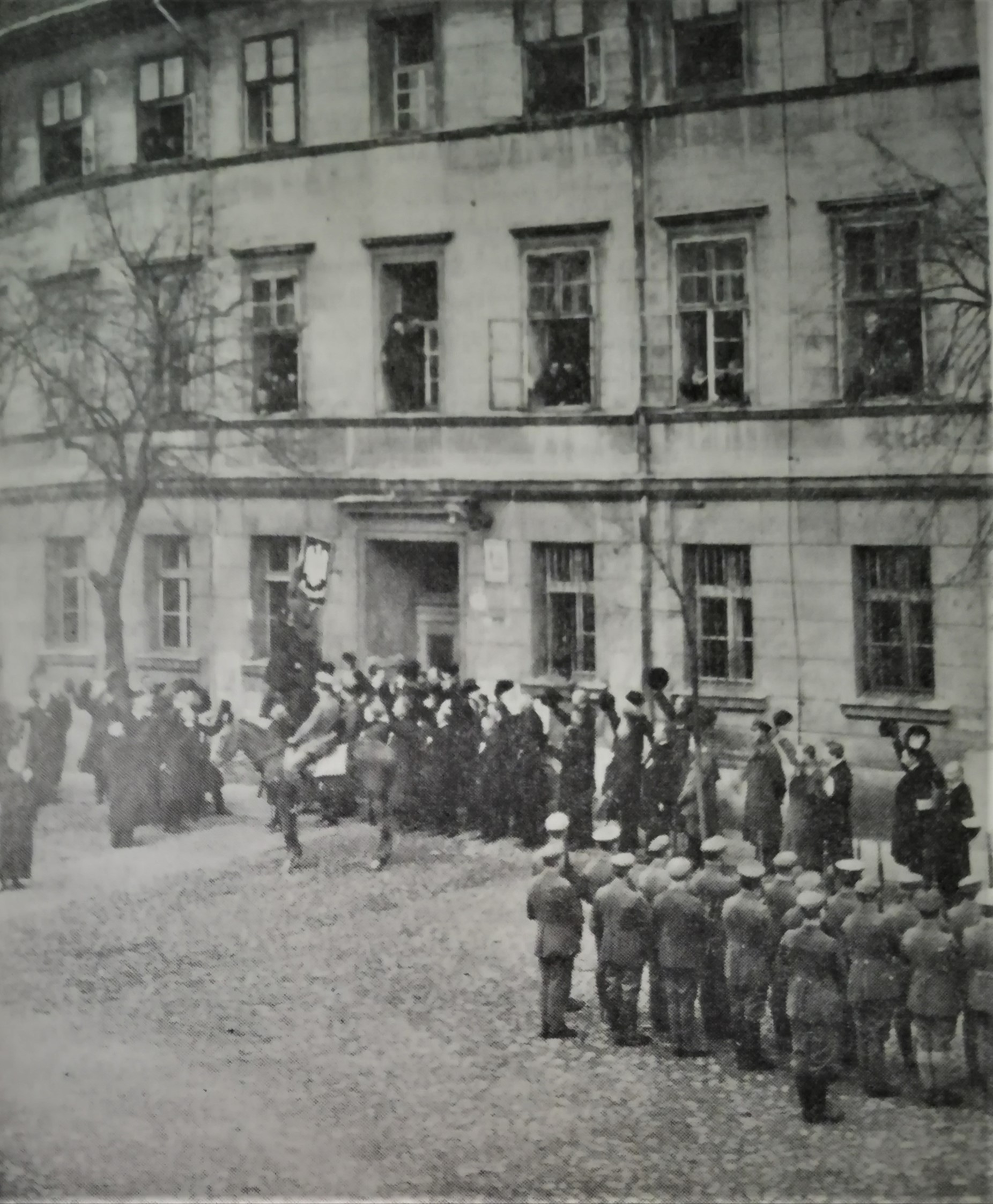
Polish insurgents place the coat of arms of Poland on the town hall in liberated Pleszew, January 1919.

Following the end of World War I, the Greater Poland uprising (1918–19) ensured that most of the region became part of the newly independent Polish state, forming most of Poznań Voivodeship (1921–1939). Northern and some western parts of Greater Poland remained in Germany, where they formed much of the province of Posen-West Prussia (1922–1938), whose capital was Schneidemühl (Piła). To maintain contact with the Poles of German-controlled northern and western Greater Poland, Poland opened a consulate in Piła in 1922. From 1933, the Polish Głos Pogranicza i Kaszub newspaper was issued in Złotów. Under the Nazi government, repressions of Poles intensified. In January 1939, Germany resumed expulsions of Poles and many were also forced to flee. The Sturmabteilung, Schutzstaffel, Hitler Youth and Bund Deutscher Osten launched attacks on Polish institutions, schools and activists. In mid-1939 the Gestapo carried out arrests of Polish activists, teachers and entrepreneurs, closed various Polish organizations and enterprises and seized their funds. The Poles tried to resist German persecution, but some were forced to escape German arrest and thus fled to Poland.

=== World War II ===
In September 1939, Germany invaded Poland starting World War II. During the attack the German army, Einsatzgruppen and Selbstschutz perpetrated various crimes against the Polish people in the occupied areas, whereas the persecution of Poles of northern and western Greater Poland reached its climax with mass arrests of Polish activists, who were detained in temporary camps in Piła and Lipka, and then deported to concentration camps, expulsions and closure of Polish schools and enterprises. The invading troops committed multiple massacres of Polish civilians and prisoners of war, including at Kłecko, Zdziechowa, Mogilno, Trzemeszno, Niewolno, Winiary, Wągrowiec, Mielno, Jankowo Dolne, Podlesie Kościelne and Obora.

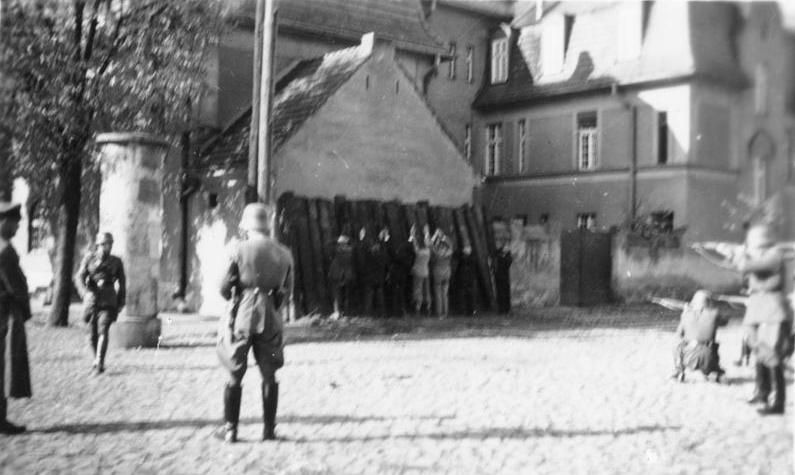
Public execution of Polish civilians by the Einsatzgruppe VI, Kórnik, 20 October 1939

Afterwards, the occupiers launched the Intelligenzaktion genocidal campaign against the Polish population, and annexed the entire region into Nazi Germany. Administratively, most of Greater Poland was included within the Reichsgau Posen, later renamed Reichsgau Wartheland (Warthe being the German name for the Warta river), whereas northern and western parts were located in the provinces of Reichsgau Danzig-West Prussia, Pomerania and Brandenburg. On 20–23 October 1939, the German police and Einsatzgruppe VI carried out mass public executions of some 300 Poles in various towns in the region, i.e. Gostyń, Kostrzyn, Kościan, Kórnik, Krobia, Książ Wielkopolski, Leszno, Mosina, Osieczna, Poniec, Śmigiel, Śrem, Środa and Włoszakowice, to terrorize and pacify the Poles. The Polish and Jewish population was classified by Nazis as subhuman and subjected to organized genocide, involving mass murder and ethnic cleansing, with many former officials and others considered potential enemies by the Nazis being imprisoned or executed, including at the notorious Fort VII concentration camp in Poznań. Major sites of massacres of Poles in the region included Dopiewiec, Dębienko, Winiary, Mędzisko, Paterek, Łobżenica, Górka Klasztorna, Kobylniki and Bukowiec. During Aktion T4, the SS-Sonderkommandos gassed over 2,700 mentally ill people from the psychiatric hospitals in Owińska, Dziekanka and Kościan.

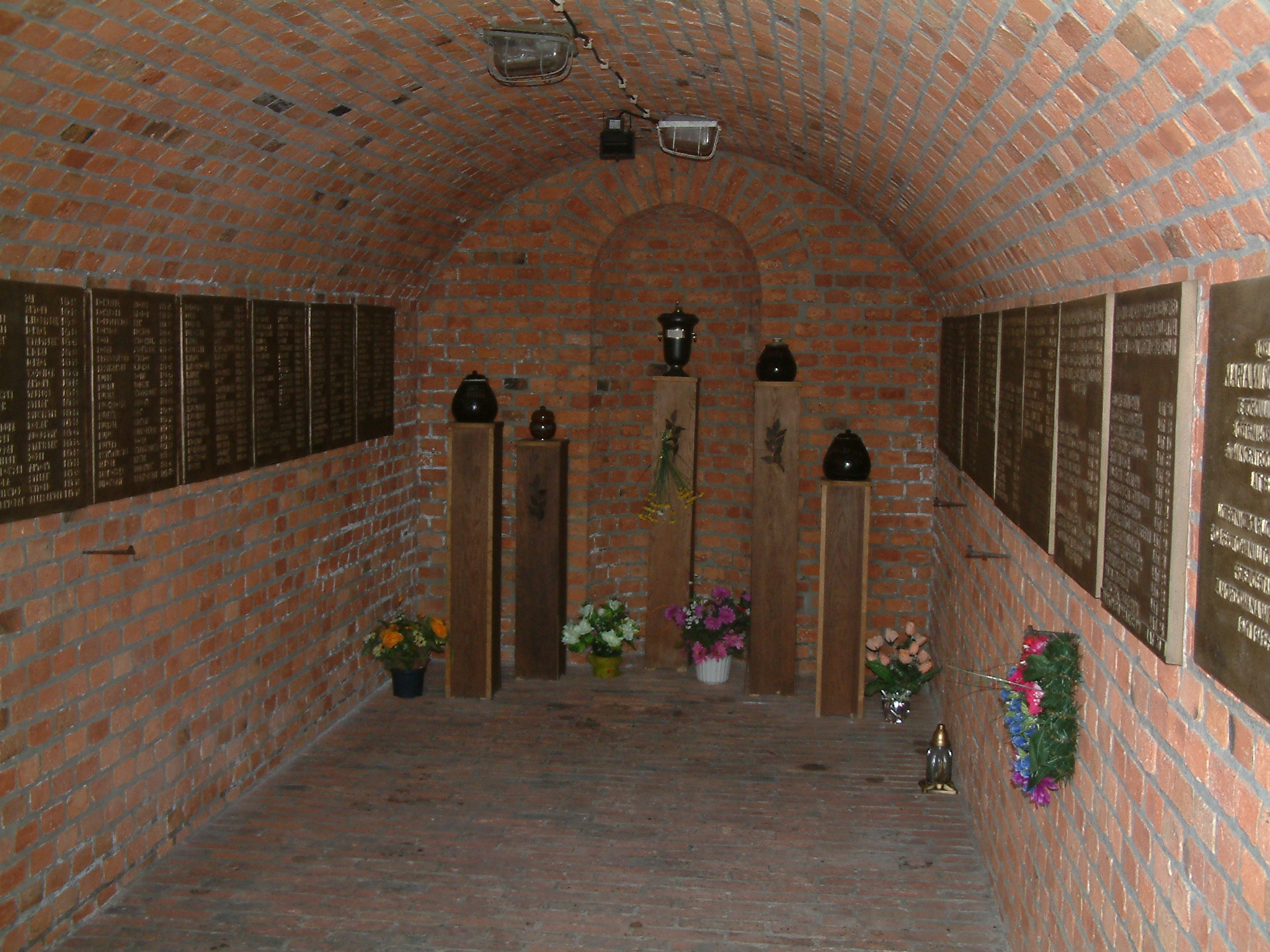
Bunker no. 16 in Fort VII in Poznań, used by the German occupiers as an improvised gas chamber

The Germans continued the expulsion of Poles, now also in pre-war Polish territory, with the Special Staff for the Resettlement of Poles and Jews (Sonderstab für die Aussiedlung von Polen und Juden) established in Poznań in November 1939, soon renamed to Office for the Resettlement of Poles and Jews (Amt für Umsiedlung der Polen und Juden), and eventually to Central Bureau for Resettlement (UWZ, Umwandererzentralstelle). The place of the Poles was taken by German colonists in accordance with the Lebensraum policy. Many Poles were also enslaved as forced labour and either sent to forced labour camps or German colonists in the region or deported to Germany and other German-occupied countries. Over 270,000 Polish children aged 10–18 were subjected to forced labour in Greater Poland, which, in addition to German profits of 500 million marks, was aimed at the children's biological destruction. The Germans also operated Germanisation camps for Polish children taken away from their parents in Kalisz, Poznań, Puszczykowo and Zaniemyśl. The children were given new German names and surnames, and were punished for any use of the Polish language, even with death. After their stay in the camp, the children were deported to Germany; only some returned to Poland after the war, while the fate of many remains unknown to this day.

Jews from the region were also expelled and deported to other locations, including to Nazi ghettos, concentration camps and forced labour camps. From 1940, the occupiers also operated several forced labour camps for Jews in the region. Due to poor feeding and sanitary conditions, epidemics spread in those camps, which, combined with frequent executions, led to a high mortality rate. On the order of Heinrich Himmler, most of the camps were dissolved in 1943, and its surviving prisoners were sent to ghettos and death camps.

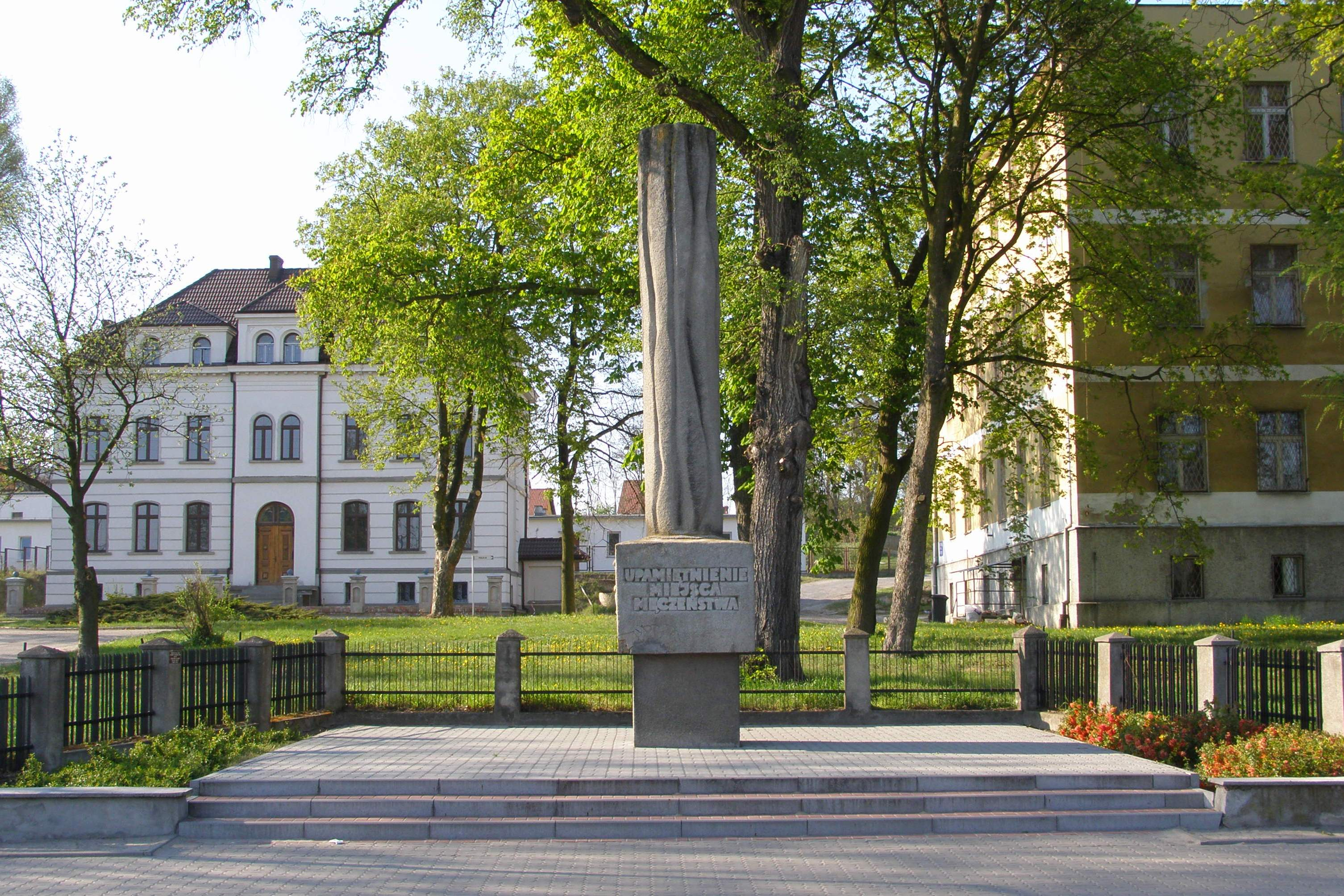
Memorial at the site of the Stalag XXI-B, Oflag XXI-B and Oflag 64 POW camps in Szubin

Germany operated several prisoner-of-war camps, including Stalag XXI-B, Stalag XXI-C, Stalag XXI-D, Stalag XXI-E, Stalag 302, Oflag II-C, Oflag XXI-A, Oflag XXI-B, Oflag XXI-C and Oflag 64, for Polish, French, British, Canadian, Australian, New Zealander, Belgian, Dutch, Serbian, American, Italian, South African and other Allied POWs in the region. There were also multiple forced labour subcamps of the Stalag II-B, Stalag II-D and Stalag XX-A POW camps in the region, a subcamp of the Gross-Rosen concentration camp in Owińska, a subcamp of the Stutthof concentration camp in Obrzycko, a subcamp of the Ravensbrück concentration camp in Kalisz Pomorski, and a camp for Sinti and Romani people in Piła. A particularly notorious prison camp was operated in Żabikowo, where mostly Poles were imprisoned, but also Luxembourgers, Dutch, Hungarians, Slovaks, Americans, Russians and deserters from the Wehrmacht, and many were tortured and executed.

The Polish resistance movement was active in the region, including the Union of Armed Struggle, Bataliony Chłopskie, Gray Ranks and Home Army. The Polish Underground State was organized, and in July 1940, even an underground Polish parliament was established in Poznań. Activities included secret Polish schooling, secret Catholic services, printing and distribution of Polish underground press, sabotage actions, espionage of German activity, military trainings, production of false documents, preparations for a planned uprising, and even secret football games. The Polish resistance provided aid to people in need, including prisoners, escapees from camps and ghettos and deserters from the German army, rescued Polish children kidnapped by the Germans, and facilitated escapes of Allied prisoners of war from German POW camps. The Germans cracked down on the resistance several times, and even kidnapped children of the resistance members and sent them to a camp for Polish children in Łódź, nicknamed "little Auschwitz" due to its conditions, where many died.

From August 1944 to January 1945, the Germans used hundreds of thousands of Poles as forced labour to build fortifications in the region ahead of the advancing Eastern Front. In January 1945, before and during their retreat, the Germans committed several further massacres of Polish civilians, prisoners and Polish and other Allied POWs, including at Pleszew, Marchwacz, Żabikowo, Łomnica and Kuźnica Żelichowska and perpetrated several death marches. Poznań was declared a fortress in the closing stages of the war, being taken by the Red Army in the Battle of Poznań, which ended on 22 February 1945.

=== Post-war period ===
After the war, Greater Poland was fully reintegrated with Poland, although with a Soviet-installed communist regime, which stayed in power until the 1980s. The region experienced several waves of anti-communist protests and strikes, including the 1956 Poznań protests and the 1980 strikes in various cities and towns, which led to the foundation of the Solidarity organization, which played a central role in the end of communist rule in Poland.

With the reforms of 1975 it was divided into seven provinces, partially or wholly located in Greater Poland (the voivodeships of Bydgoszcz, Gorzów, Kalisz, Konin, Leszno, Piła and Poznań). The present-day Greater Poland Voivodeship, again with Poznań as its capital, was created in 1999, however, parts of Greater Poland are located in the Kuyavian-Pomeranian, Lubusz, Łódź and West Pomeranian voivodeships.

== Sights ==
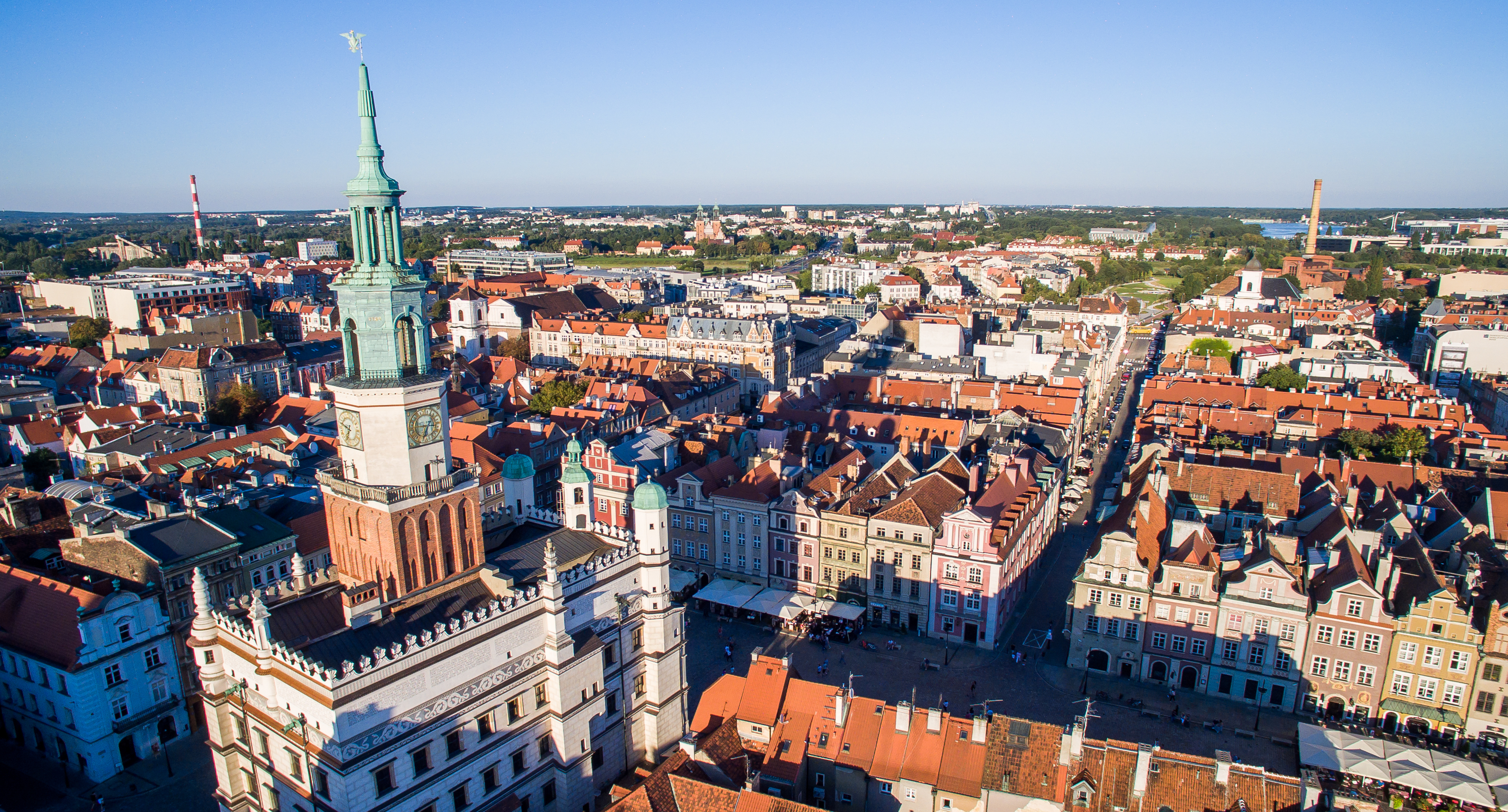
The Poznań Old Town with its elaborate tenements, splendid churches and the Renaissance Town Hall is among the most recognizable landmarks of Greater Poland and the entire country.

The region is rich in historical architecture of various styles from Romanesque and Gothic through Renaissance and Baroque to Neoclassical and Art Nouveau.

Greater Poland boasts 15 Historic Monuments of Poland:

- Biskupin archaeological site
- Gorzeński Palace and park complex in Dobrzyca
- Renaissance Basilica on the Holy Mountain, Głogówko
- Royal Gniezno Cathedral
- Former Cistercian abbey in Gościkowo
- Manor and park complex in Koszuty
- Kórnik Castle and park complex with the All Saints' Church in Kórnik
- Ląd Abbey
- Benedictine Monastery with the Romanesque-Gothic-Baroque Church of the Nativity of the Virgin Mary in Lubiń
- Piast Royal Castle in Międzyrzecz
- Ostrów Lednicki
- Poznań Old Town with the Ostrów Tumski, and the adjacent Park Cytadela and Fort Winiary
- Baroque Raczyński Palace and park complex in Rogalin
- Baroque Sanctuary of Our Lady of Rokitno in Rokitno
- Rydzyna Old Town with the Baroque Rydzyna Castle

Major museums include the Museum of Polish State Origins in Gniezno, and the National Museum and Wielkopolska Museum of Independence in Poznań. Several castles and palaces house museums, such as those in Dobrzyca, Gołuchów, Jarocin, Kołaczkowo, Koźmin Wielkopolski, Kórnik, Międzyrzecz, Poznań, Rogalin and Śmiełów.

Poland's largest church, the Basilica of Our Lady of Licheń, is located in the region.

One of the two principal and five total cemeteries of the Commonwealth War Graves Commission in Poland is located in Poznań, with more than 400 burials from both world wars.

The oldest preserved European signpost beyond the boundaries of the former Roman Empire is located in Konin.

== Cuisine ==
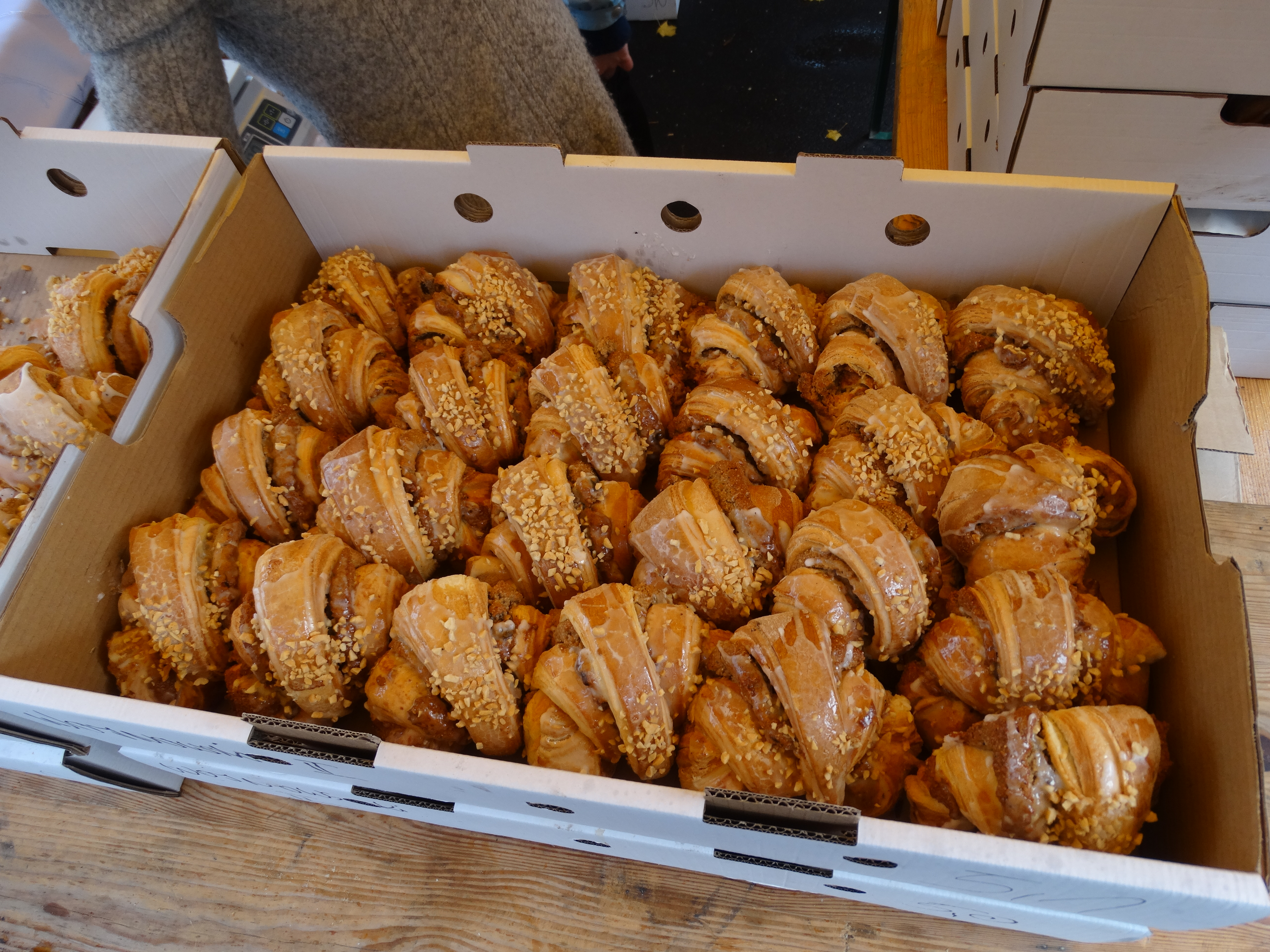
St. Martin's croissants

In addition to traditional nationwide Polish cuisine, Greater Poland is known for its variety of regional and local traditional foods and drinks, which include especially various meat products (incl. various types of kiełbasa), cheeses, honeys, beverages and various dishes and meals, officially protected by the Ministry of Agriculture and Rural Development of Poland. Among the most known local snacks are the St. Martin's croissant from Poznań and Kalisz andruts.

Notable centers of traditional meat production include Grodzisk Wielkopolski, Krotoszyn, Kruszewnia, Nowy Tomyśl, Rawicz, Trzcianka and Złotniki, whereas centers of traditional cheese and quark production include Wągrowiec, Gniezno, Oborniki, Witkowo, Witoldzin and Września.

A plethora of traditional Polish honey is produced in various places, especially in the Noteć and Warta river valleys in the north and west. Notable centers of honey production include Pszczew, Wałcz, Tuczno, Lubiszyn and Stare Drawsko in northern and western Greater Poland and Kopaszewo and Witosław in southern Greater Poland. The Saint Michael's Honey Fair is held annually in Gorzów Wielkopolski.

Grodzisk Wielkopolski is the place of origin of the Grodziskie beer style. Other traditional Polish beers, officially protected by the Ministry of Agriculture and Rural Development of Poland, are produced in Bojanowo, Czarnków, Miłosław, Nakło nad Notecią and Wschowa.

== Sports ==
Football and speedway enjoy the largest following in Greater Poland. The most accomplished football teams are Lech Poznań and Warta Poznań. 18-times Team Polish Champions (as of 2023), Unia Leszno, is the most accomplished speedway team in Poland, and other accomplished teams in the region are Stal Gorzów Wielkopolski and Polonia Piła.

Main handball clubs are MKS Kalisz, KPR Ostrovia Ostrów Wielkopolski, Nielba Wągrowiec, Stal Gorzów Wielkopolski, Grunwald Poznań and KPR Wolsztyniak Wolsztyn.

Field hockey enjoys less popularity, however, the region is dominant in the sport in Poland, with 82 of the 89 men's Polish Championships won by local teams (as of August 2026).

== Main cities ==
The following table lists the cities in proper Greater Poland with a population greater than 25,000 (2015):

	City	Population (2015)	Voivodeship in 1750	Voivodeship in 2016	Additional information
1.	Poznań	548,028	Poznań	Greater Poland	Former capital of Poland, medieval provincial ducal capital in Poland, former voivodeship and province capital, historical capital of Greater Poland, former royal city of Poland.
2.	Kalisz	103,997	Kalisz	Greater Poland	Medieval provincial ducal capital in Poland, former voivodeship capital, historical capital of Greater Poland, former royal city of Poland.
3.	Konin	77,224	Kalisz	Greater Poland	Former royal city of Poland.
4.	Piła	74,609	Poznań	Greater Poland	Former royal city of Poland.
5.	Ostrów Wielkopolski	72,890	Kalisz	Greater Poland	Former private town of the Przebendowski family.
6.	Gniezno	69,883	Kalisz	Greater Poland	Former capital of Poland, medieval provincial ducal capital in Poland, former voivodeship capital, former royal city of Poland, ecclesiastical capital of Poland.
7.	Leszno	64,589	Poznań	Greater Poland	Former private town of the Leszczyński family.
8.	Swarzędz	31,084	Poznań	Greater Poland	Former private town of the Grudziński family, part of the Poznań metropolitan area.
9.	Luboń	30,676	Poznań	Greater Poland	Part of the Poznań metropolitan area.
10.	Śrem	30,152	Poznań	Greater Poland	Former royal city of Poland.
11.	Września	29,552	Kalisz	Greater Poland	Former private town.
12.	Krotoszyn	29,397	Kalisz	Greater Poland	Former private town.
13.	Jarocin	26,311	Kalisz	Greater Poland	Former private town.
14.	Wałcz	26,231	Poznań	West Pomeranian	Former royal city of Poland.
15.	Wągrowiec	25,178	Kalisz	Greater Poland	

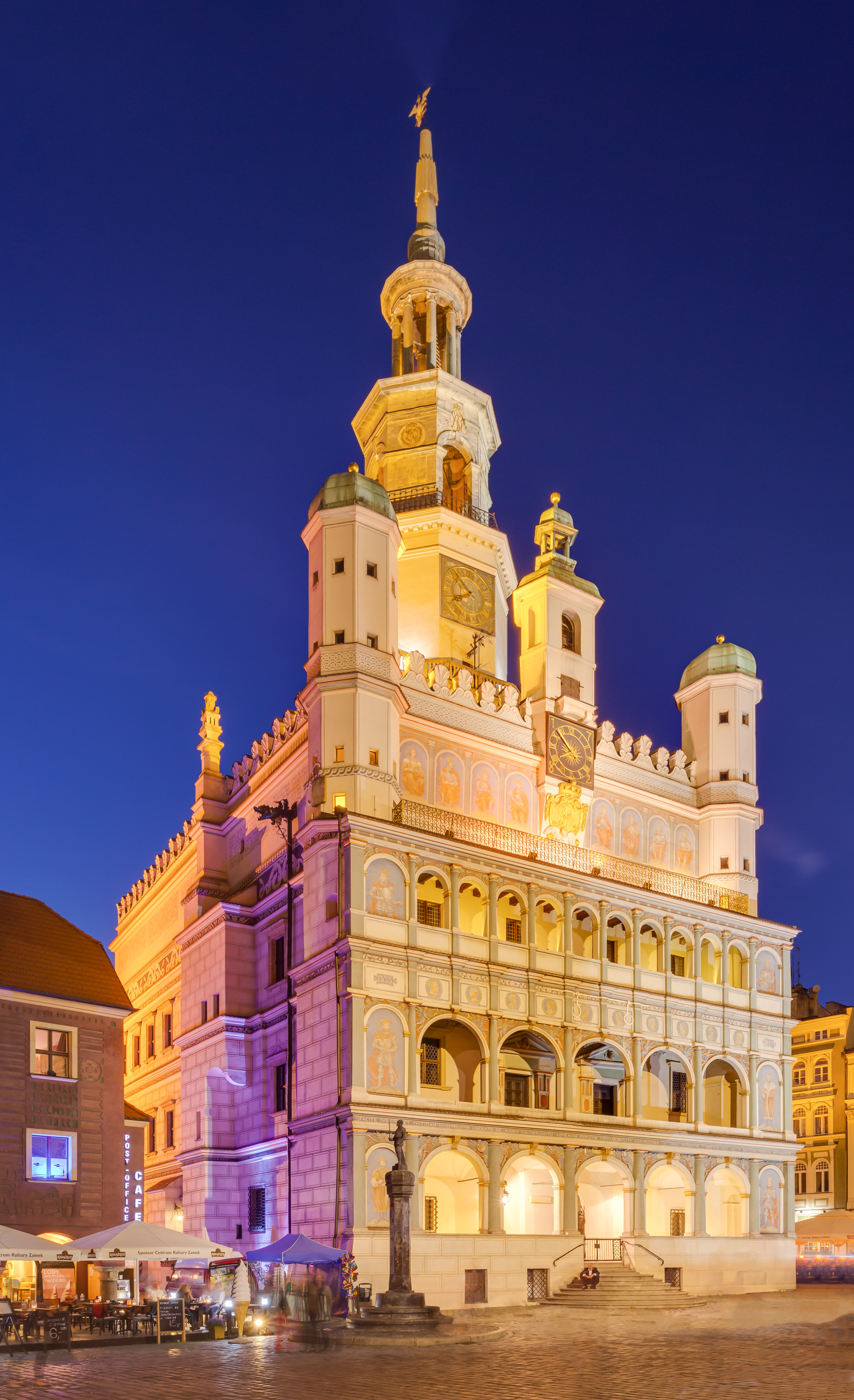
Poznań Town Hall

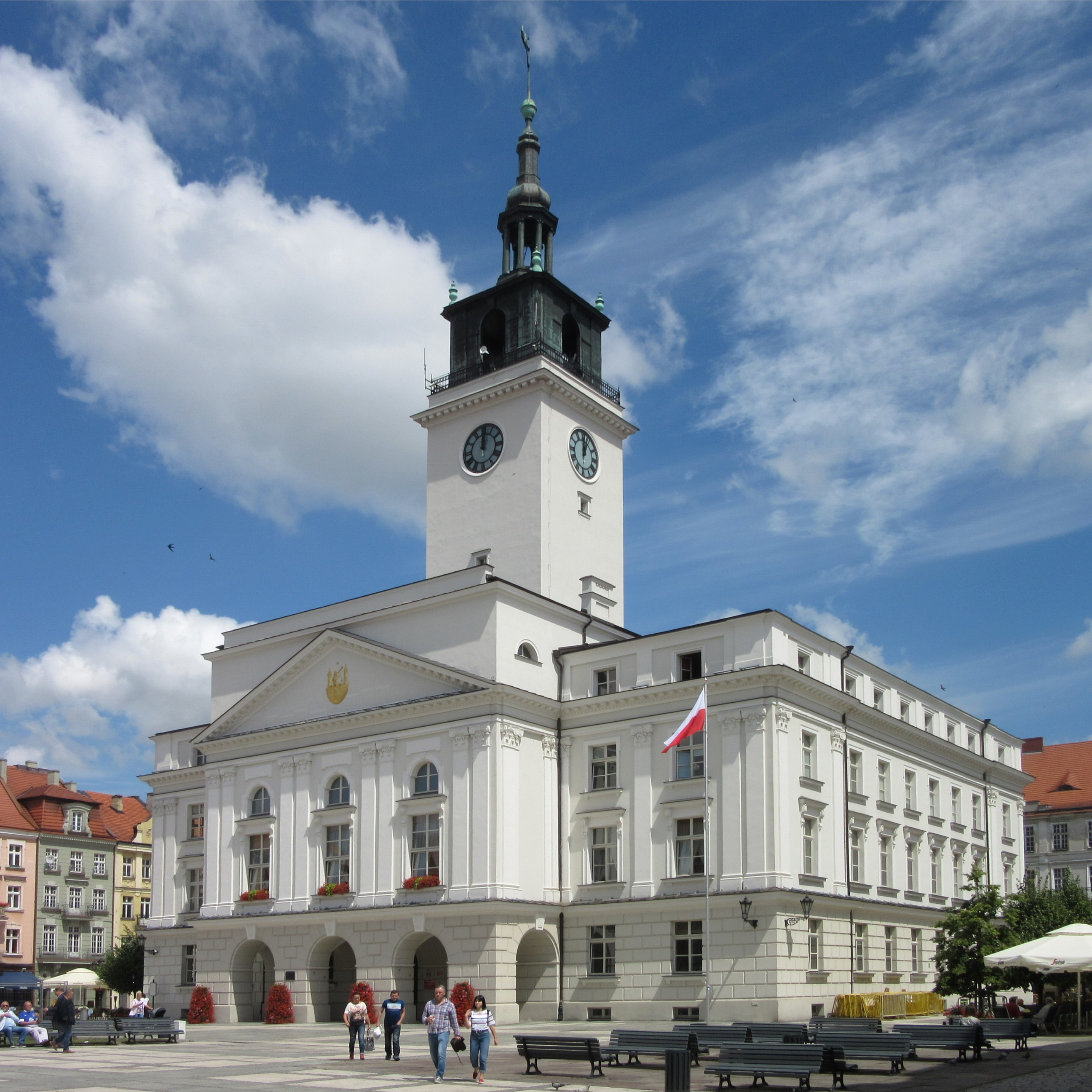
Kalisz Town Hall

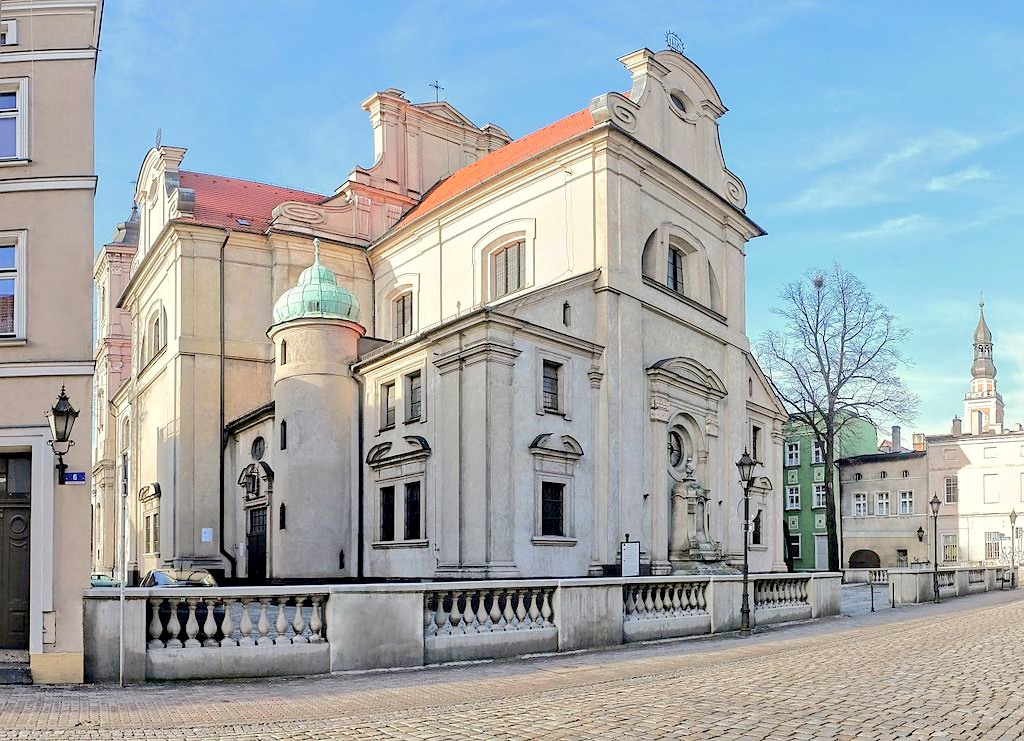
Baroque St. Nicholas' Church in Leszno

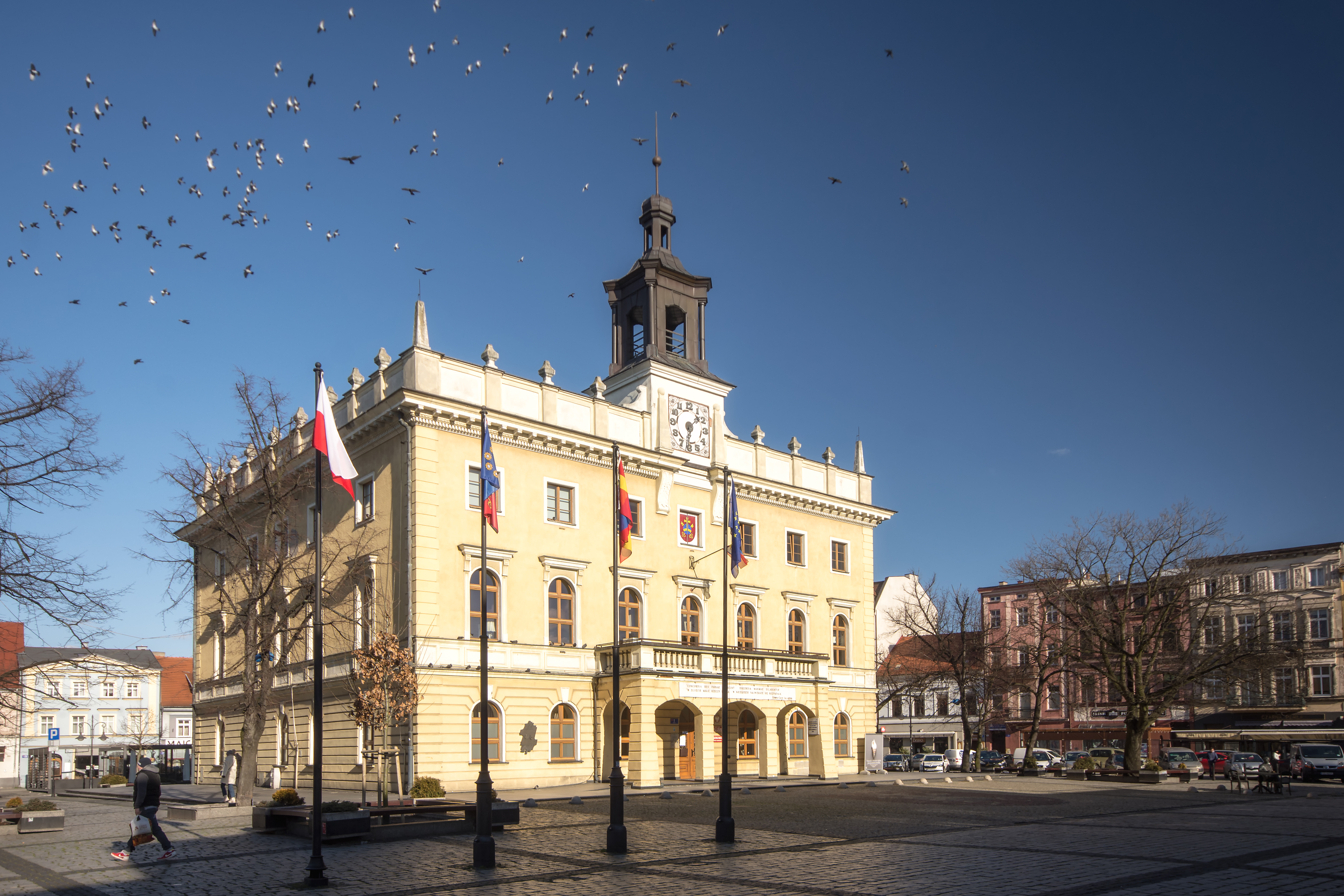
Market Square and Town Hall in Ostrów Wielkopolski

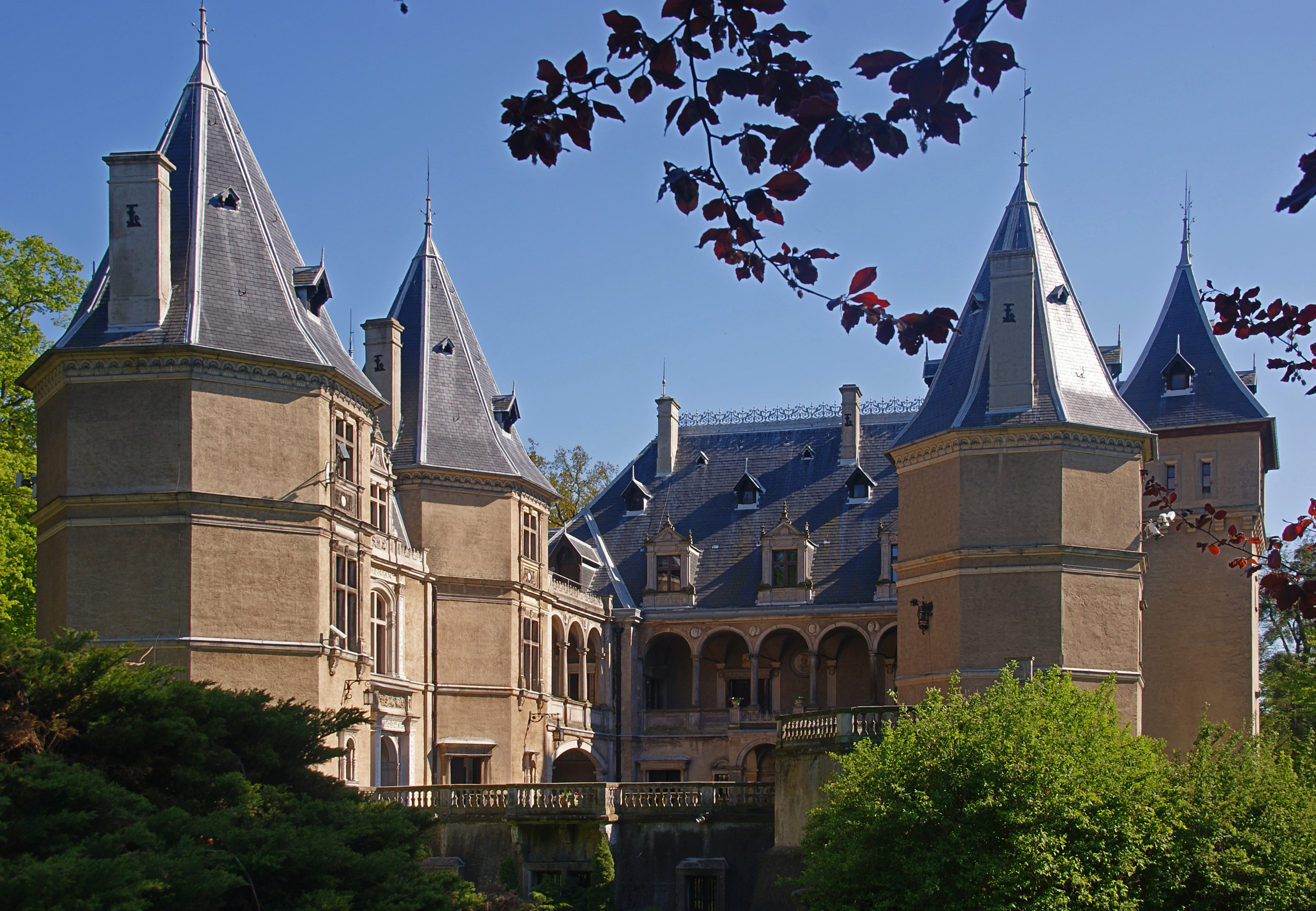
Renaissance Gołuchów Castle

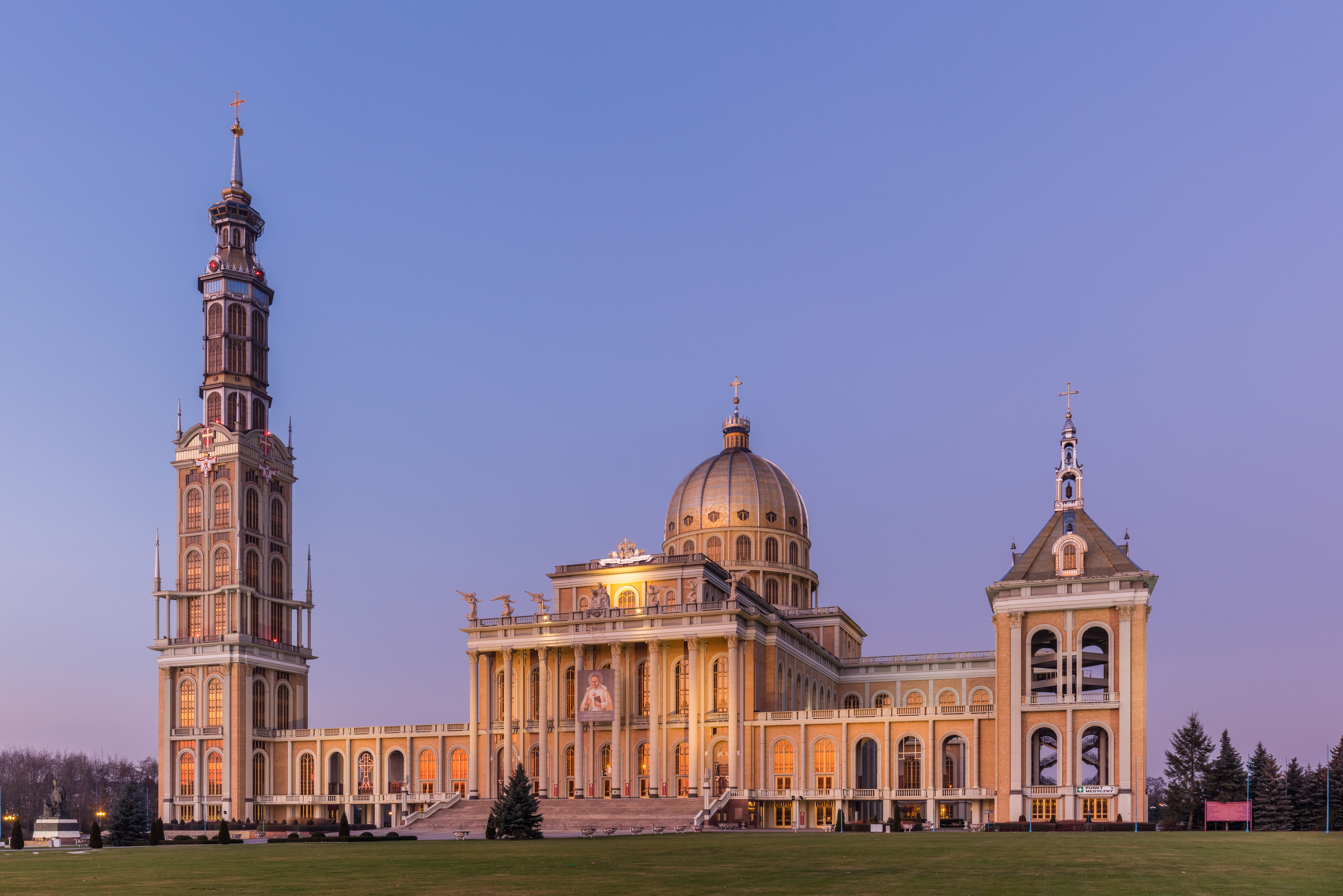
Marian sanctuary in Licheń near Konin

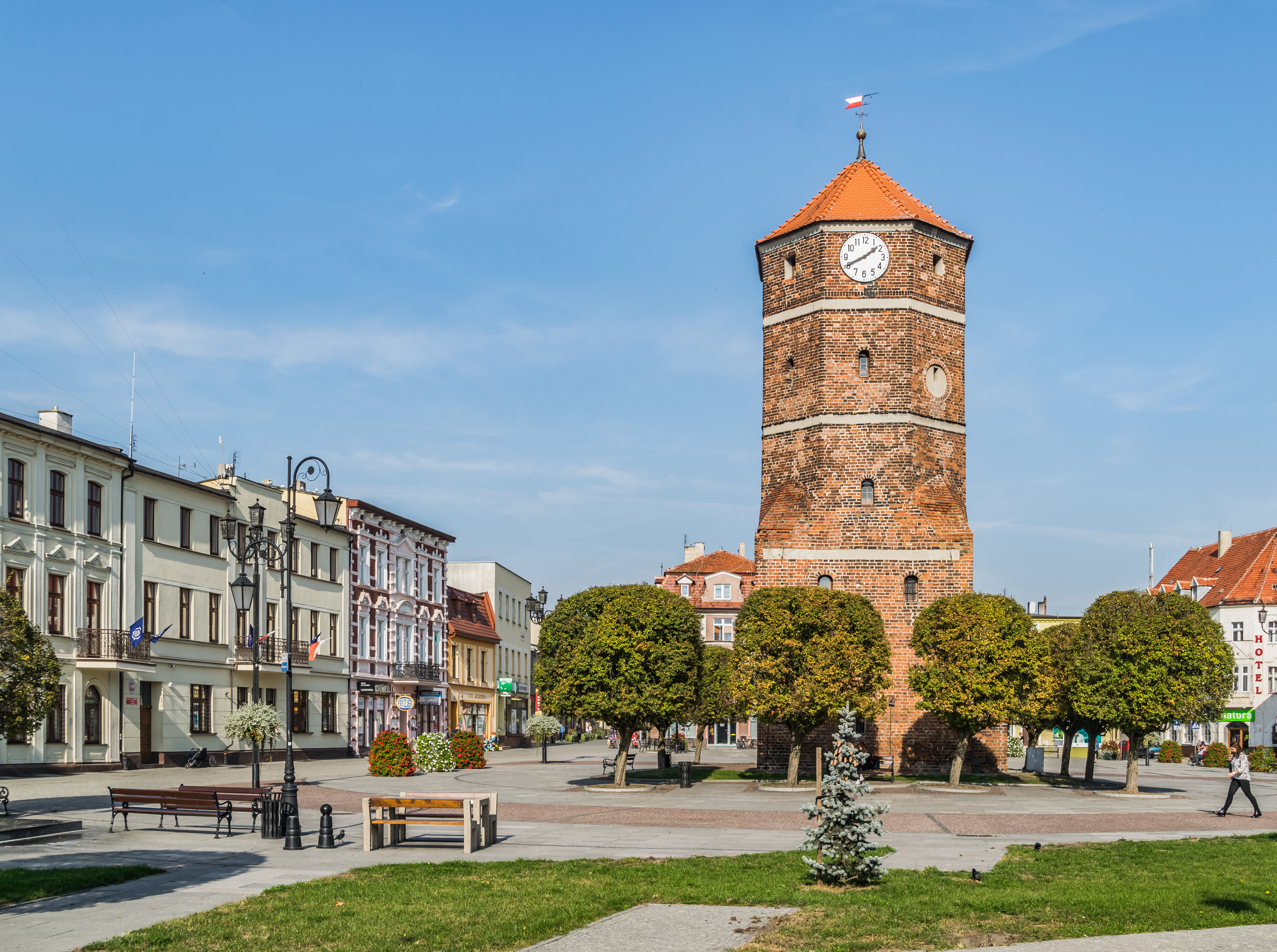
Main square and medieval town hall tower in Żnin

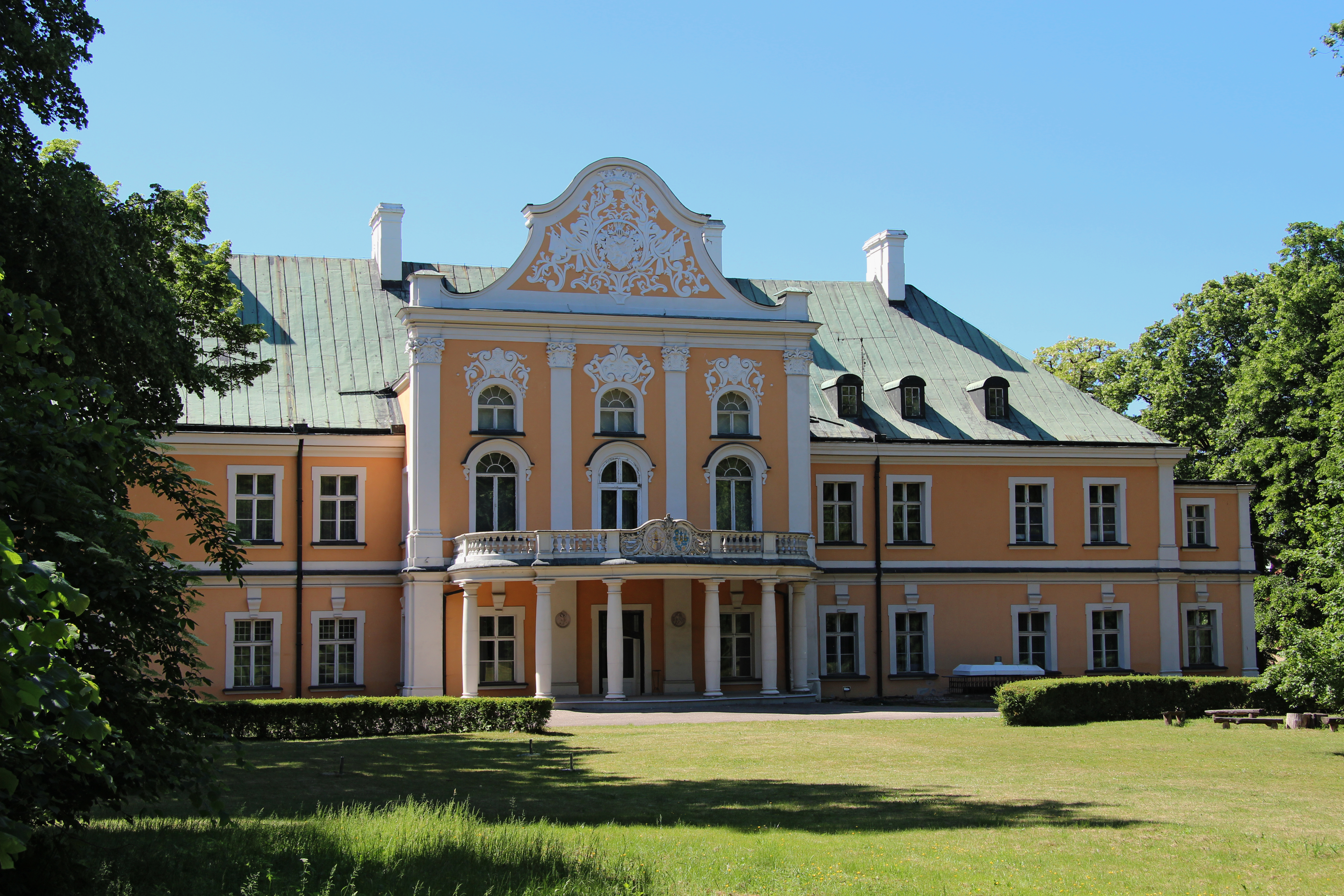
Szołdrski Palace in Czempiń

== See also ==
- Greater Poland Voivodeship
- Bibliography of the history of Poland

== Bibliography ==
- Cygański, Mirosław (1984). "Hitlerowskie prześladowania przywódców i aktywu Związków Polaków w Niemczech w latach 1939–1945". Przegląd Zachodni (in Polish) (4).
- Wardzyńska, Maria (2009). Był rok 1939. Operacja niemieckiej policji bezpieczeństwa w Polsce. Intelligenzaktion (in Polish). Warszawa: IPN.
- Pietrowicz, Aleksandra (2011). "Konspiracja wielkopolska 1939–1945". Biuletyn Instytutu Pamięci Narodowej (in Polish). No. 5–6 (126–127). IPN. ISSN 1641-9561.
