= Gustaw Potworowski =

Polish activist

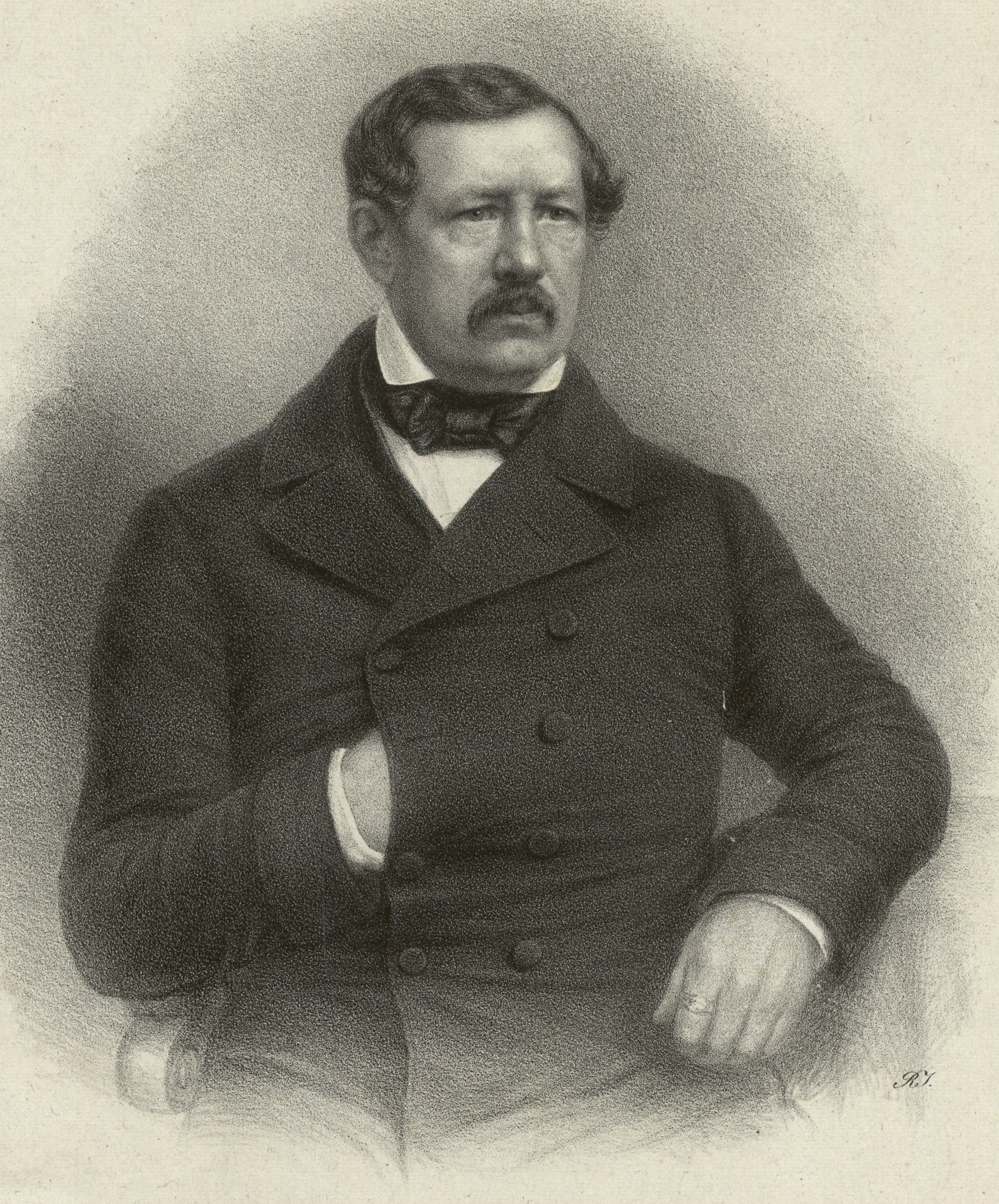

Gustaw Potworowski, count, (Polish pronunciation: [ˈɡustaf pɔtfɔˈrɔfskʲi]; 3 June 1800, Bielewo – 23 November 1860, Poznań) was a Polish activist, founder of the Kasyno in Gostyń, activist of the Polish League (Liga Polska).

Born into an old Calvinist noble family, was one of the leading persons of the Polish national movement in the Grand Duchy of Posen, later Prussian Province of Posen. He was the founding chairman of the Polish National Committee (1848).
