= Soplicowo =

Soplicowo may refer to:

- The fictional country estate of the Soplica clan from Pan Tadeusz
- Former Polish name of the former village of Saplitsy, Belarus
- Soplicowo, Otwock, part of the city of Otwock, Poland
- Skansen Soplicowo in Cichowo, Greater Poland Voivodeship, Poland, based on Pan Tadeusz
