= Bernard Ptak =

Polish politician (born 1954)

member of Sejm 2005-2007
- In office 25 September 2005 – 2007

Personal details
- Born: 9 August 1954 (age 71)
- Party: Self-Defence of the Republic of Poland

Bernard Adam Ptak (born 9 August 1954 in Mościszki) is a Polish politician. He was elected to the Sejm on 25 September 2005, getting 7023 votes in 36 Kalisz district as a candidate from the Self-Defence of the Republic of Poland list.

== See also ==
- Members of Polish Sejm 2005-2007
