= Żelazno =

Żelazno may refer to the following places in Poland:

- Żelazno, Lower Silesian Voivodeship (south-west Poland)
- Żelazno, Kościan County in Greater Poland Voivodeship (west-central Poland)
- Żelazno, Piła County in Greater Poland Voivodeship (west-central Poland)
- Żelazno, Warmian-Masurian Voivodeship (north Poland)
