= Teklimyśl =

- Village
- Location within Poland
- Coordinates: 51°56′N 16°49′E
- Country: Poland
- Voivodeship: Greater Poland
- County: Kościan
- Gmina: Krzywiń

Teklimyśl [tɛˈklimɨɕl] is a village in the administrative district of Gmina Krzywiń, within Kościan County, Greater Poland Voivodeship, in west-central Poland.
