= Łuszkowo =

- Village
- Location within Poland
- Coordinates: 52°2′N 16°52′E
- Country: Poland
- Voivodeship: Greater Poland
- County: Kościan
- Gmina: Krzywiń
- Highest elevation: 80 m (260 ft)
- Lowest elevation: 70 m (230 ft)
- Population (approx.): 600

Łuszkowo [wuʂˈkɔvɔ] is a village in the administrative district of Gmina Krzywiń, within Kościan County, Greater Poland Voivodeship, in west-central Poland.

The village has an approximate population of 600.
