= Jerka =

Village in Kościan County, Poland

- Village
- Location within Poland
- Coordinates: 51°59′57″N 16°51′6″E
- Country: Poland
- Voivodeship: Greater Poland
- County: Kościan
- Gmina: Krzywiń
- Population: 1,414

Jerka [ˈjɛrka] is a village in the administrative district of Gmina Krzywiń, within Kościan County, Greater Poland Voivodeship, in west-central Poland.

== Transport ==
Jerka lies on the intersection of voivodeship roads 432 and 308.

Voivodeship road 432 connects Jerka to Leszno and to Śrem.

Voivodeship road 308 connects Jerka to Kościan to the west and to Gostyń to the east.

The nearest railway station is in Kościan.
