= Zbęchy-Pole =

- Village
- Location within Poland
- Coordinates: 51°59′12″N 16°54′38″E
- Country: Poland
- Voivodeship: Greater Poland
- County: Kościan
- Gmina: Krzywiń

Zbęchy-Pole [ˈzbɛ̃xɨ ˈpɔlɛ] is a village in the administrative district of Gmina Krzywiń, within Kościan County, Greater Poland Voivodeship, in west-central Poland.
