= Rogaczewo Małe =

- Village
- Location within Poland
- Coordinates: 52°3′N 16°49′E
- Country: Poland
- Voivodeship: Greater Poland
- County: Kościan
- Gmina: Krzywiń
- Population: 191

Rogaczewo Małe [rɔɡaˈt͡ʂɛvɔ ˈmawɛ] is a village in the administrative district of Gmina Krzywiń, within Kościan County, Greater Poland Voivodeship, in west-central Poland.
