= Szurkowo, Kościan County =

Szurkowo
- Village
- Location within Poland
- Coordinates: 51°57′59″N 16°50′43″E
- Country: Poland
- Voivodeship: Greater Poland
- County: Kościan
- Gmina: Krzywiń

Szurkowo [ʂurˈkɔvɔ] is a village in the administrative district of Gmina Krzywiń, within Kościan County, Greater Poland Voivodeship, in west-central Poland.
