= Rąbiń =

- Village
- Location within Poland
- Coordinates: 52°3′N 16°52′E
- Country: Poland
- Voivodeship: Greater Poland
- County: Kościan
- Gmina: Krzywiń
- Elevation: 80 m (260 ft)
- Population: 365

Rąbiń [ˈrɔmbiɲ] is a village in the administrative district of Gmina Krzywiń, within Kościan County, Greater Poland Voivodeship, in west-central Poland.
