= Gmina Krzywiń =

Gmina Krzywiń Krzywiń Commune
- Gmina
- Coat of arms
- Interactive map of Gmina Krzywiń
- Coordinates (Krzywiń): 51°58′N 16°49′E
- Country: Poland
- Voivodeship: Greater Poland
- County: Kościan
- Seat: Krzywiń

Area
  - Total: 179.16 km^{2} (69.17 sq mi)

Population (2011)
  - Total: 10,069
  - Density: 56.201/km^{2} (145.56/sq mi)
  - Urban: 1,643
  - Rural: 8,426
- Website: www.krzywin.pl

Gmina Krzywiń is an urban-rural gmina (administrative district) in Kościan County, Greater Poland Voivodeship, in west-central Poland. Its seat is the town of Krzywiń, which lies approximately 18 kilometres (11 mi) south-east of Kościan and 49 km (30 mi) south of the regional capital Poznań.

The gmina covers an area of 179.16 square kilometres (69.2 sq mi), and as of 2006 its total population is 9,892 (out of which the population of Krzywiń amounts to 1,547, and the population of the rural part of the gmina is 8,345).

The gmina contains part of the protected area called Chłapowski Landscape Park.

== Villages ==
Apart from the town of Krzywiń, Gmina Krzywiń contains the villages and settlements of Bielewo, Bieżyń, Boża Wola, Cichowo, Czerwona Wieś, Gierłachowo, Jerka, Jurkowo, Jurkowo-Huby, Kopaszewo, Kuszkowo, Łagowo, Lubiń, Łuszkowo, Mościszki, Nowy Dwór, Polesie, Rąbiń, Rąbinek, Rogaczewo Małe, Rogaczewo Wielkie, Stary Dębiec, Świniec, Szurkowo, Teklimyśl, Wieszkowo, Wymysłowo, Zbęchy, Zbęchy-Pole, Żelazno and Zgliniec.

== Neighbouring gminas ==
Gmina Krzywiń is bordered by the gminas of Czempiń, Dolsk, Gostyń, Kościan, Krzemieniewo, Osieczna, Śmigiel and Śrem.
