= Jurkowo-Huby =

- Village
- Location within Poland
- Coordinates: 51°58′53″N 16°45′31″E
- Country: Poland
- Voivodeship: Greater Poland
- County: Kościan
- Gmina: Krzywiń

Jurkowo-Huby [jurˈkɔvɔ ˈxubɨ] is a village in the administrative district of Gmina Krzywiń, within Kościan County, Greater Poland Voivodeship, in west-central Poland.
