= Nowy Dwór, Kościan County =

Nowy Dwór
- Village
- Location within Poland
- Coordinates: 51°58′N 16°53′E
- Country: Poland
- Voivodeship: Greater Poland
- County: Kościan
- Gmina: Krzywiń

Nowy Dwór [ˈnɔvɨ ˈdvur] is a village in the administrative district of Gmina Krzywiń, within Kościan County, Greater Poland Voivodeship, in west-central Poland.
