= Polesie, Kościan County =

Polesie
- Village
- Location within Poland
- Coordinates: 51°59′12″N 16°43′23″E
- Country: Poland
- Voivodeship: Greater Poland
- County: Kościan
- Gmina: Krzywiń

Polesie [pɔˈlɛɕɛ] is a village in the administrative district of Gmina Krzywiń, within Kościan County, Greater Poland Voivodeship, in west-central Poland.
