= Rąbinek =

- Village
- Location within Poland
- Coordinates: 52°03′31″N 16°52′23″E
- Country: Poland
- Voivodeship: Greater Poland
- County: Kościan
- Gmina: Krzywiń

Rąbinek [rɔmˈbinɛk] is a village in the administrative district of Gmina Krzywiń, within Kościan County, Greater Poland Voivodeship, in west-central Poland.
