= Kuszkowo =

- Village
- Location within Poland
- Coordinates: 51°58′34″N 16°47′33″E
- Country: Poland
- Voivodeship: Greater Poland
- County: Kościan
- Gmina: Krzywiń

Kuszkowo [kuʂˈkɔvɔ] is a village in the administrative district of Gmina Krzywiń, within Kościan County, Greater Poland Voivodeship, in west-central Poland.
