= Zgliniec =

- Village
- Location within Poland
- Coordinates: 51°58′N 16°44′E
- Country: Poland
- Voivodeship: Greater Poland
- County: Kościan
- Gmina: Krzywiń

Zgliniec [ˈzɡliɲɛt͡s] is a village in the administrative district of Gmina Krzywiń, within Kościan County, Greater Poland Voivodeship, in west-central Poland.
