= Wymysłowo, Kościan County =

Wymysłowo
- Village
- Location within Poland
- Coordinates: 51°57′21″N 16°53′52″E
- Country: Poland
- Voivodeship: Greater Poland
- County: Kościan
- Gmina: Krzywiń

Wymysłowo [vɨmɨˈswɔvɔ] is a village in the administrative district of Gmina Krzywiń, within Kościan County, Greater Poland Voivodeship, in west-central Poland.
