= Boża Wola, Greater Poland Voivodeship =

Boża Wola
- Village
- Location within Poland
- Coordinates: 51°57′13″N 16°48′40″E
- Country: Poland
- Voivodeship: Greater Poland
- County: Kościan
- Gmina: Krzywiń

Boża Wola [ˈbɔʐa ˈvɔla] is a village in the administrative district of Gmina Krzywiń, within Kościan County, Greater Poland Voivodeship, in west-central Poland.
