= Kalisz andruts =

Sweet, flat wafers of Polish origin

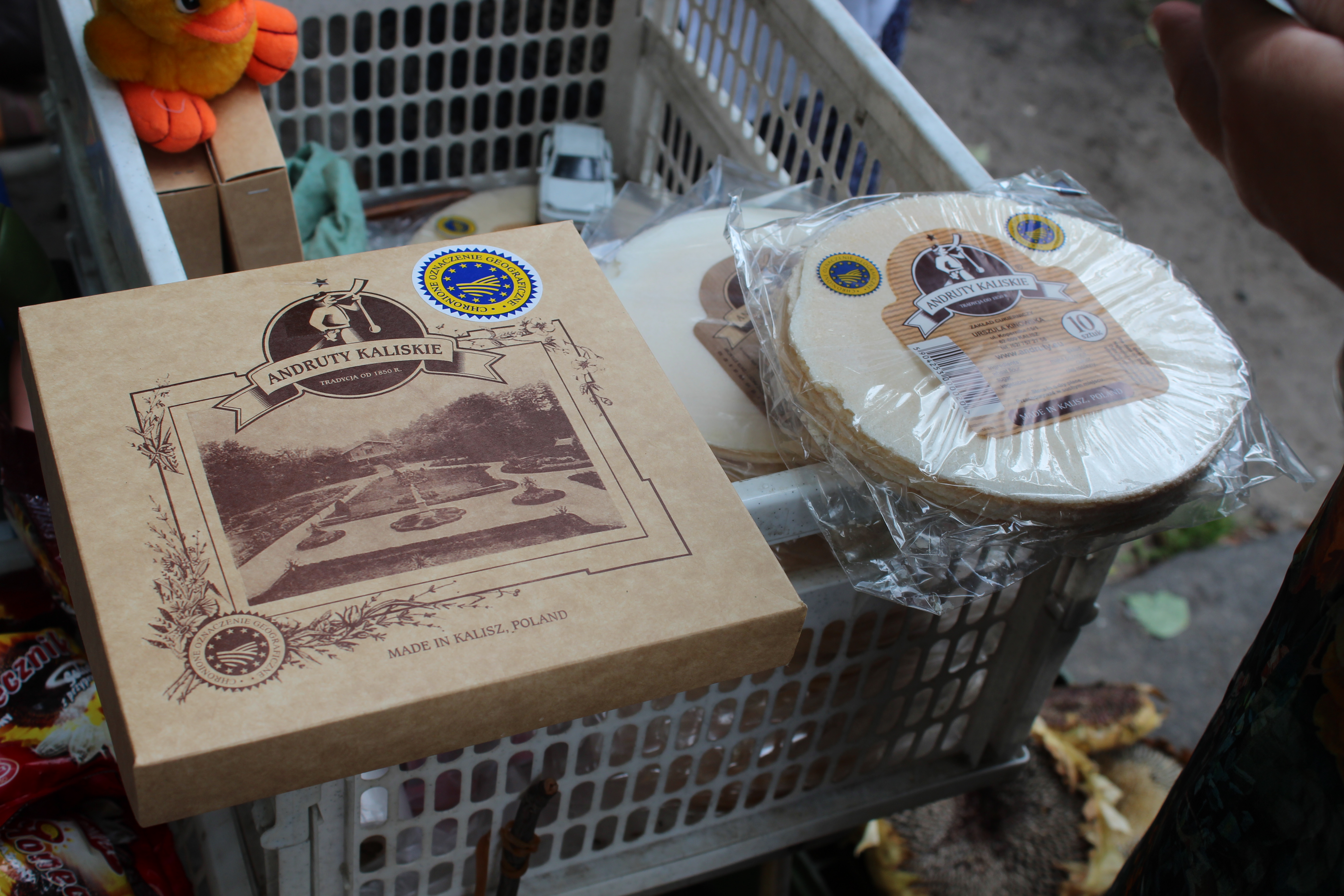
- Kalisz andruts
- Type: Wafer
- Course: Dessert
- Place of origin: Kalisz, Poland
- Serving temperature: Cold
- Main ingredients: Wafer

The Kalisz andruts (Polish: andruty kaliskie), also simply known as andruts (Polish: andruty), is lightly sweet, flat wafers first recorded to be baked at the beginning of the nineteenth-century in Kalisz and the Kalisz Region.

Since 9 December 2005 andruts are enlisted on the list of traditional produce by the Ministry of Agriculture and Rural Development. Since 21 April 2009 andruty kaliskie have been placed on the European Union's Geographical Indications and Traditional Specialities list.
