= Żelazno, Kościan County =

Żelazno
- Village
- Location within Poland
- Coordinates: 51°56′9″N 16°53′18″E
- Country: Poland
- Voivodeship: Greater Poland
- County: Kościan
- Gmina: Krzywiń
- Population: 500

Żelazno [ʐɛˈlaznɔ] is a village in the administrative district of Gmina Krzywiń, within Kościan County, Greater Poland Voivodeship, in west-central Poland.
