= Kopaszewo =

- Village
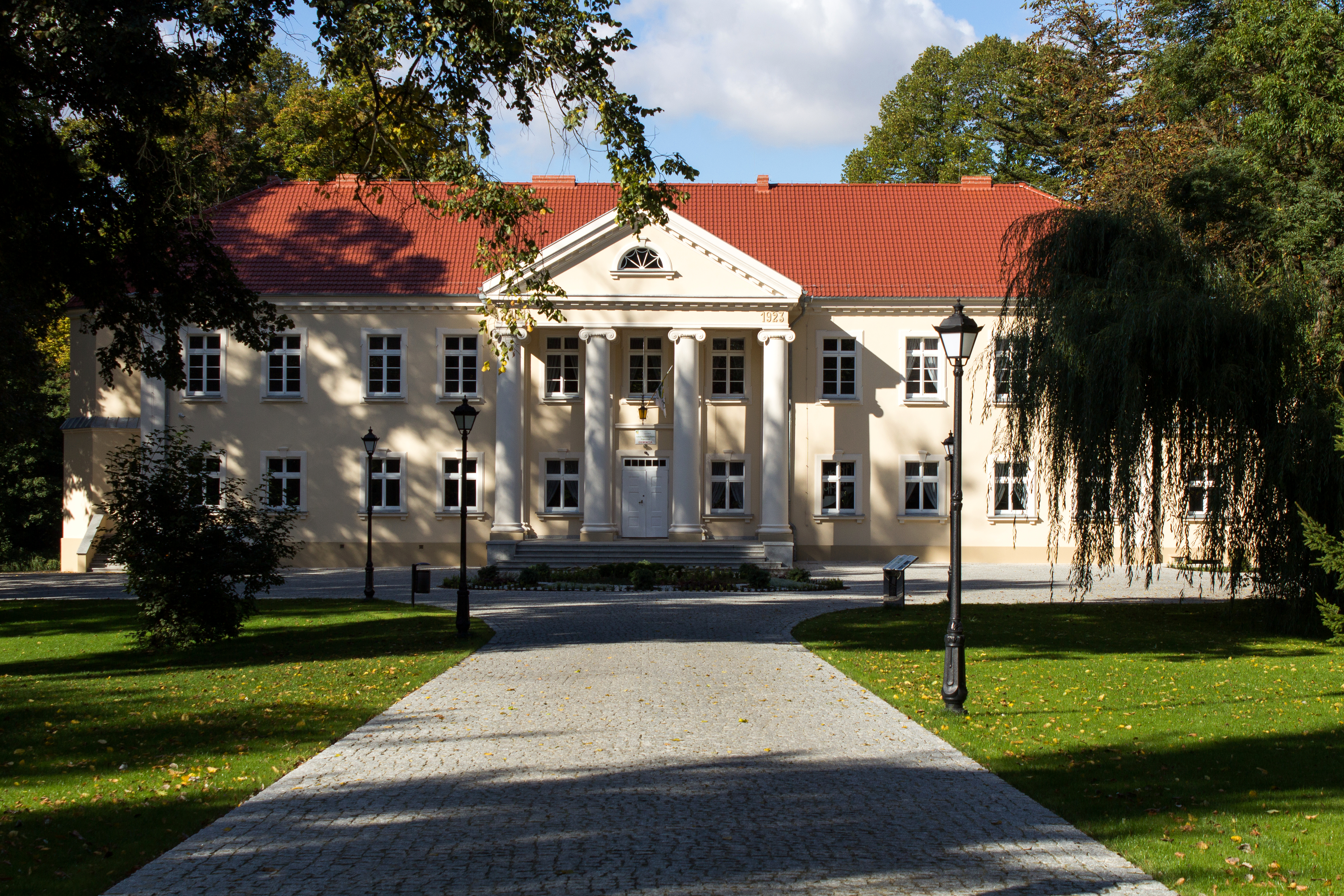
- Kopaszewo Palace

- Location within Poland
- Coordinates: 52°0′N 16°48′E
- Country: Poland
- Voivodeship: Greater Poland
- County: Kościan
- Gmina: Krzywiń

Population
  - Total: 502
- Time zone: UTC+1 (CET)
  - Summer (DST): UTC+2 (CEST)
- Vehicle registration: PKS

Kopaszewo [kɔpaˈʂɛvɔ] is a village in the administrative district of Gmina Krzywiń, within Kościan County, Greater Poland Voivodeship, in west-central Poland.

== History ==
Kopaszewo was a private village of Polish nobility, administratively located in the Kościan County in the Poznań Voivodeship in the Greater Poland Province of the Kingdom of Poland.

The local palace was visited several times by poet Adam Mickiewicz in 1831–1832, and by actress Helena Modjeska in 1868.

In the mid-19th century, the estate was purchased by Dezydery Chłapowski. Chłapowski established sections planted with trees for protection from the wind, and established a park with a variety of tree species, both typical for Poland, such as large-leaved lindens, maples and ash trees, as well as more exotic species, such as honey locusts, European smoketrees, chestnut trees and London planes. Other plants are also found in the area. Beekeeping soon developed, and Kopaszewo became a center for the production of various types of honey, now designated a local traditional food.

== Cuisine ==
The officially protected traditional food of Kopaszewo as designated by the Ministry of Agriculture and Rural Development of Poland, is the Kopaszewo Honey, which comes in several varieties, i.e. multi-flower honey, rapeseed honey, acacia honey and linden honey.
