= Cichowo, Greater Poland Voivodeship =

Cichowo
- Village
- Location within Poland
- Coordinates: 51°59′35″N 16°58′47″E
- Country: Poland
- Voivodeship: Greater Poland
- County: Kościan
- Gmina: Krzywiń
- Population: 94

Cichowo [t͡ɕiˈxɔvɔ] is a village in the administrative district of Gmina Krzywiń, within Kościan County, Greater Poland Voivodeship, in west-central Poland.

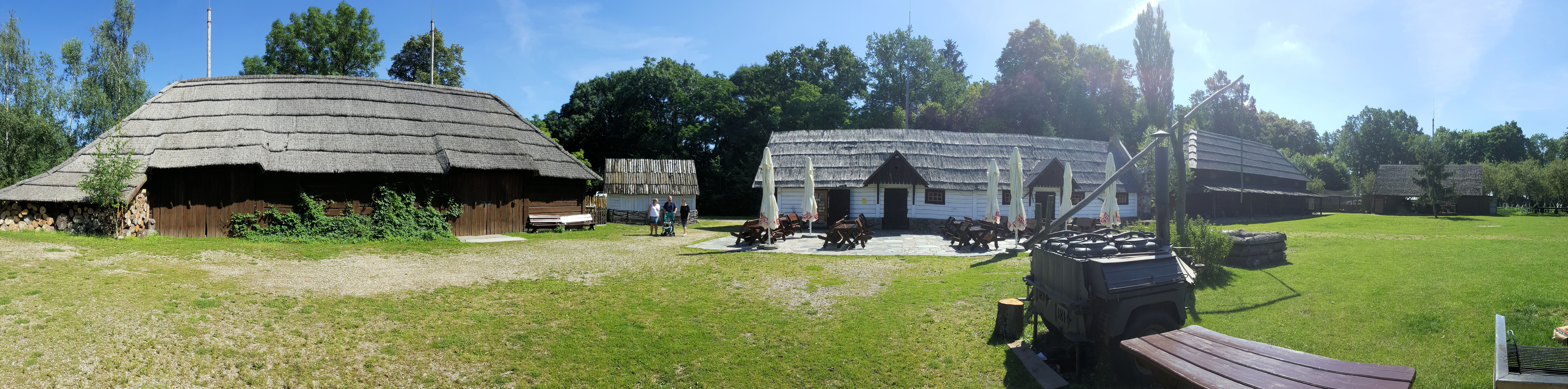
Cichowo

In 1999 the skansen Soplicowo was open to the public, created from the elements of the scenery used to shoot the film 1999 Pan Tadeusz. Soplicowo is the fictional country estate of the Soplica clan from the novel Pan Tadeusz.
