= Głuchowo =

Głuchowo may refer to the following places:

- Głuchowo, Kościan County in Greater Poland Voivodeship (west-central Poland)
- Głuchowo, Kuyavian-Pomeranian Voivodeship (north-central Poland)
- Głuchowo, Masovian Voivodeship (north-central Poland)
- Głuchowo, Poznań County in Greater Poland Voivodeship (west-central Poland)
- Głuchowo, Szamotuły County in Greater Poland Voivodeship (west-central Poland)
- Głuchowo, Lubusz Voivodeship (west Poland)
