= Gorzyczki =

Gorzyczki may refer to the following places in Poland:

- Gorzyczki, Greater Poland Voivodeship (west-central Poland)
- Gorzyczki, Silesian Voivodeship (south Poland)
