= Reshevsky =

Reshevsky, Rzeszewski is a Russian and Polish masculine surname. Its feminine counterpart is Reshevskaya, Rzeszewska. Notable people with the surname include:

- Lenny Rzeszewski (1923–2013), American basketball player
- Samuel Reshevsky (1911–1992), Polish-born American chess player

== See also ==
- Rejewski
- Raszewski
- Rashevsky
