= Polne =

Polne may refer to the following places in Poland:

- Polne, Lubusz Voivodeship
- Polne, West Pomeranian Voivodeship
