= Kazimierz Raszewski =

Polish general (1864–1941)

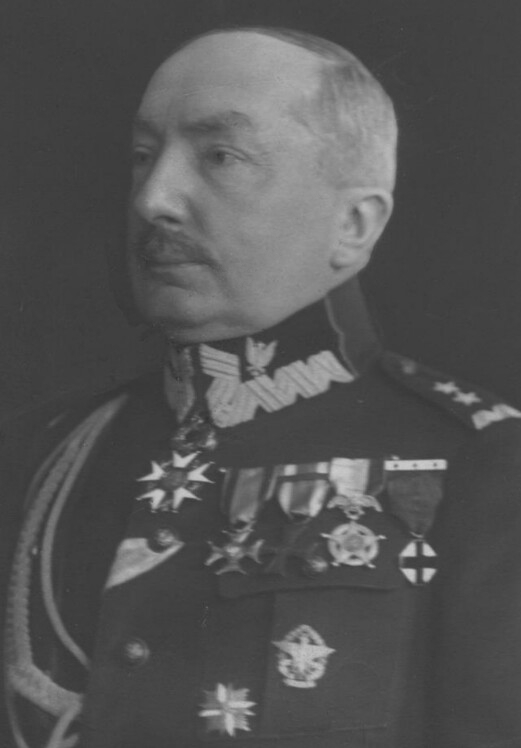
- Kazimierz Raszewski
- Born: 29 February 1864; Jasień, Kingdom of Prussia
- Died: 14 January 1941 (aged 76) Poznań, occupied Poland
- Buried: Górczyn Cemetery, Poznań
- Allegiance: Kingdom of Prussia (1885–1918); Second Polish Republic (1918–1925)
- Branch: Imperial German Army; Armia Wielkopolska; Polish Army
- Service years: 1885–1925
- Rank: Generał broni (Lieutenant general)
- Conflicts: First World War; Greater Poland uprising Polish–Soviet War
- Awards
- Spouse: Olga Luchs (m. 1892)
- Children: Lambert (born 1893); Izabela (1894–1917)

Kazimierz Raszewski (29 February 1864 – 14 January 1941) was a lieutenant general of the Polish Army.

== Early life ==
Raszewski was born 29 February 1864 in a small village called Jasień near Poznań (Czempiń Municipal), in the Province of Posen in the Kingdom of Prussia. Kazimierz was the second son of a szlachta (Polish landed gentry) Ignacy Raszewski and Józefa Koczorowska. His great grandfather, Kazimierz Turno, was a general of the Army of the Duchy of Warsaw.

In 1827, he started attending the Real School in Poznań. He later moved to the Saint Mary Magdalene School. In 1884, he finished school in Bolesławiec.

== Military career ==
He started his military career in 1885 by joining the 2. Schlesische Husaren-Regiment Nr. 6 in Prudnik. The commander of the Regiment in Prudnik was lieutenant Rosenberg, a friend of Raszewski's father with whom he served in the Husaren-Regiment Nr. 1 in Milicz. Due to Raszewski's Polish descent, he was being mocked by other soldiers. After many years, in his autobiography, he stated that he wouldn't become an officer without the support he received from Rosenberg while in Prudnik.

After graduating from military school in Nysa in 1887, he came back to Prudnik as a second lieutenant and became the commander of the platoon. In 1892, he married Olga Luchs. The couple had a son Lambert (born 1893) and a daughter Izabela (1894–1917).

In 1894, he was moved to 1. Schlesische Husaren-Regiment Nr. 4 in Oława. In 1913, he joined the Husaren-Regiment Nr. 16 in Schleswig. During World War I, he served on Western and Eastern Front.

In 1918, he joined the Armia Wielkopolska to fight in the Greater Poland uprising. He later participated in the Polish–Soviet War.

In 1932 he published his memoirs of World War One and the Polish-Soviet War.

== Promotions ==
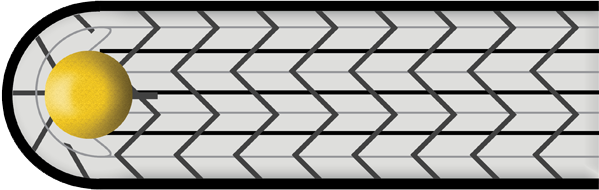
- Leutnant (Second lieutenant) - 1887
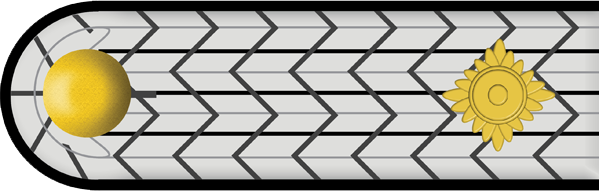
- Oberleutnant (First lieutenant) - 1895
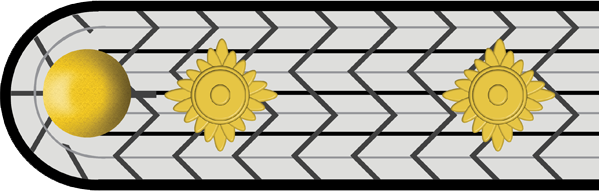
- Rittmeister (Rittmaster) - 1901
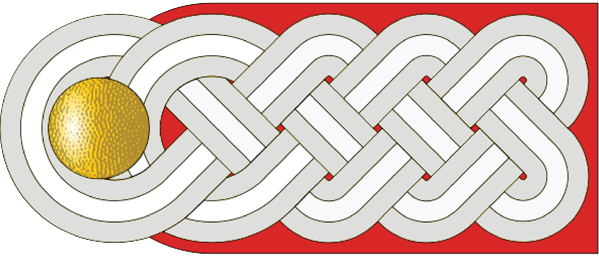
- Major (Major) - 1913
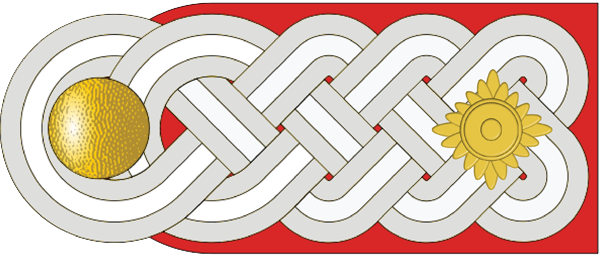
- Oberstleutnant (Lieutenant colonel) - 21 January 1918
- Pułkownik (Colonel) - 1919
- Generał brygady (Brigadier general) - 1 April 1919
- Generał dywizji (Major general) - 3 May 1922
- Generał broni (Lieutenant general) - 28 May 1928

== Honours and awards ==
- Silver Cross of Virtuti Militari (1921)
- Commander's Cross of the Order of Polonia Restituta (2 May 1923)
- Cross of Valour (twice)
- Cross on the Silesian Ribbon of Valor and Merit, 2nd Class
- Gold Cross of Merit
- Commemorative Medal for the War of 1918–1921
- Medal of the 10th Anniversary of Regained Independence
- Iron Cross, 2nd Class (German Empire)
- Grand Officer of the Order of St. Sava (Yugoslavia)
- Commandeur of the Legion of Honour (France)
- Officier of the Legion of Honour (France, 1921)
- Knight of the Order of Merit (Chile)
