= Sierniki =

Sierniki may refer to the following places:

- Sierniki, Kościan County in Greater Poland Voivodeship (west-central Poland)
- Sierniki, Oborniki County in Greater Poland Voivodeship (west-central Poland)
- Sierniki, Kuyavian-Pomeranian Voivodeship (north-central Poland)
