= Piotrowo Drugie =

- Village
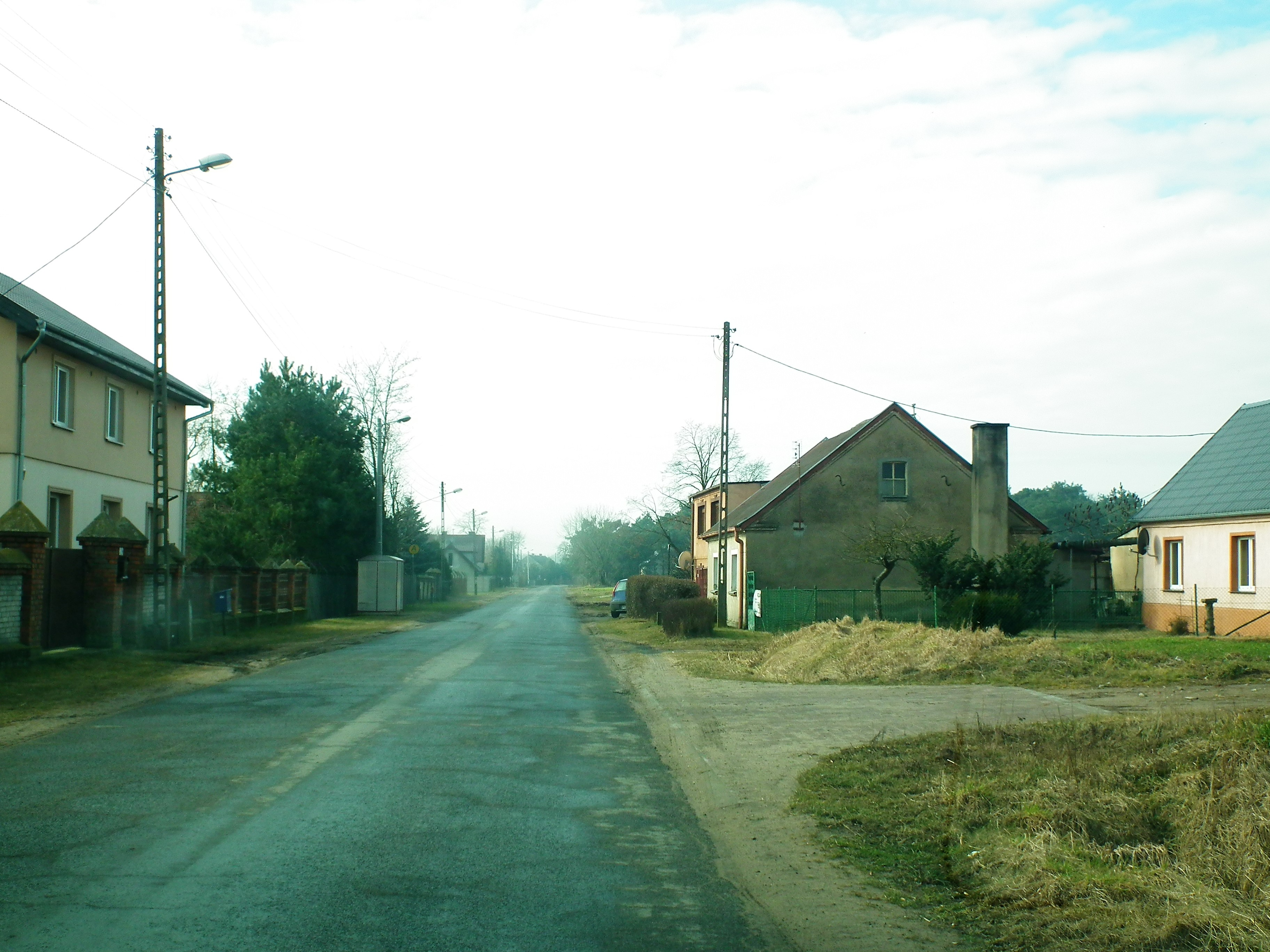
- Street of Piotrowo Drugie

- Location within Poland
- Coordinates: 52°10′52″N 16°40′15″E
- Country: Poland
- Voivodeship: Greater Poland
- County: Kościan
- Gmina: Czempiń

Piotrowo Drugie [pjɔˈtrɔvɔ ˈdruɡʲɛ] is a village in the administrative district of Gmina Czempiń, within Kościan County, Greater Poland Voivodeship, in west-central Poland.
