= Wilhelm Rescher =

German politician

Mayor of Potsdam
- In office 1957–1961
- Preceded by: Kurt Promnitz
- Succeeded by: Brunhilde Hanke

Mayor of Luckenwalde
- In office 1952–1957
- Preceded by: Paula Gürth

Personal details
- Born: 1 March 1911 Forst, German Empire
- Died: 25 September 1983 (aged 72) Potsdam, German Democratic Republic
- Party: Socialist Unity Party of Germany (1946-); Communist Party of Germany (1932-1946)
- Awards: Patriotic Order of Merit, Honor clasp, in gold (1981); Patriotic Order of Merit, in gold (1976); Patriotic Order of Merit, in silver (1971); Patriotic Order of Merit, in bronze (1959)

Wilhelm "Willi" Rescher (1 March 1911 – 25 September 1983) was a German politician. From 1957 to 1961, he served as mayor of Potsdam. Rescher was also mayor of Luckenwalde from 1952 to 1957.

== Life ==
Rescher was born on 1 March 1911 in Forst, into a working-class family. He worked as an unskilled laborer in the textile industry and in agriculture. In 1925, Rescher joined the Young Communist League of Germany (KJVD). In 1932 he became a member of the Communist Party of Germany (KPD). From 1931 to 1933 he was a member of the district leadership of the KJVD in Forst.

After the Nazi Party seized power, Rescher joined the communist resistance. He was imprisoned in Sonnenburg concentration camp in February 1933 on the grounds of "protective custody". After his release in October 1933, he resumed his work with the underground communist resistance, including working as a courier to Prague. In January 1936, he emigrated to Czechoslovakia. He was arrested again in Prague in 1939 after German troops occupied Czechoslovakia. In February 1940, he was taken to Berlin-Moabit prison. Rescher was sentenced to seven years in prison by the People's Court in February 1941. He was imprisoned in the Brandenburg-Görden Prison until he was liberated by the Red Army in April 1945.

After 1945, he held various positions in the administration of the Soviet occupation zone of Germany. Rescher joined the Socialist Unity Party of Germany (SED) in 1946; and served in several local leadership roles for the party. In 1952, he succeeded Paula Gürth as mayor Luckenwalde; a position he would hold until 1957. In December 1957, Rescher became mayor of Potsdam, succeeding Kurt Promnitz. He would remain mayor until September 1961, when he was succeeded by Brunhilde Hanke.

Rescher died on 25 September 1983 in Potsdam.

== Awards ==
- 1959, Patriotic Order of Merit, in Bronze
- 1971, Patriotic Order of Merit, in Silver
- 1976, Patriotic Order of Merit, in Gold
- 1981, Patriotic Order of Merit, Honor clasp, in Gold
