= Nowe Borówko =

- Village
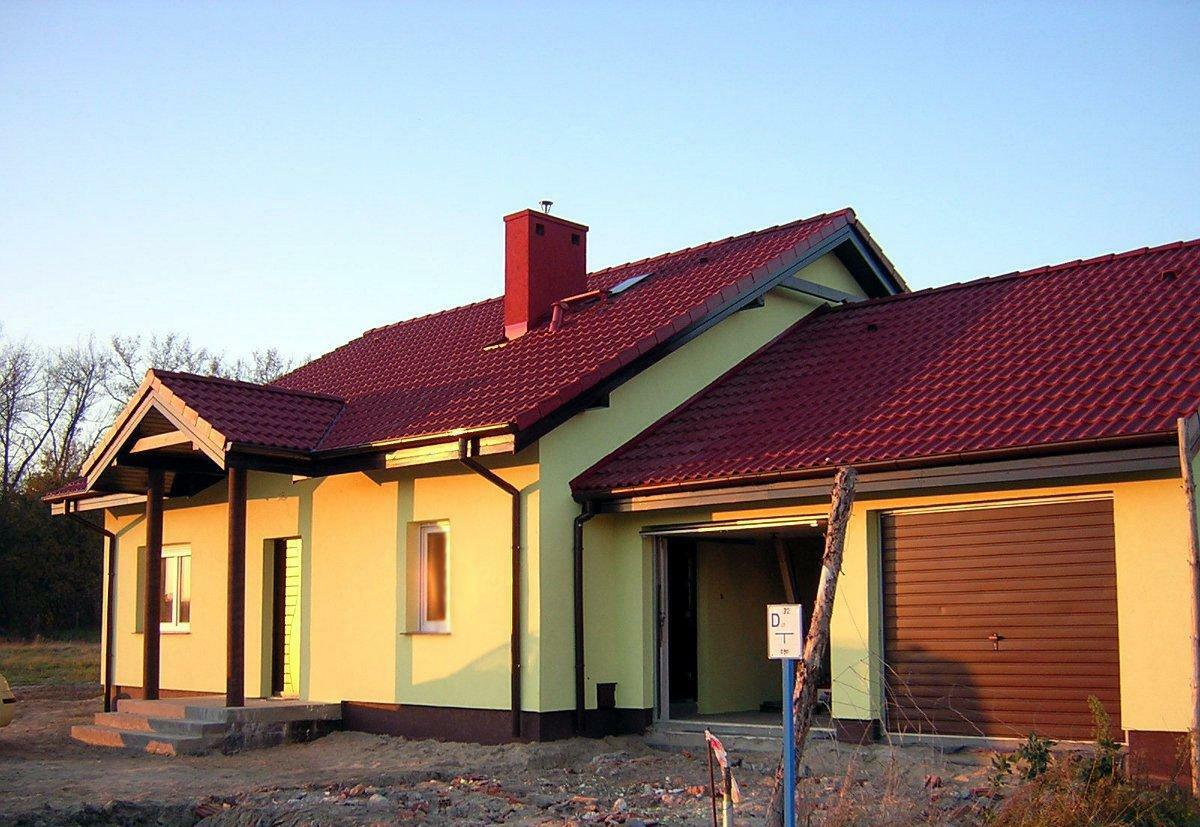
- A Building in Nowy Borówko

- Location within Poland
- Coordinates: 52°07′43″N 16°45′49″E
- Country: Poland
- Voivodeship: Greater Poland
- County: Kościan
- Gmina: Czempiń

Nowe Borówko [ˈnɔvɛ bɔˈrufkɔ] is a village in the administrative district of Gmina Czempiń, within Kościan County, Greater Poland Voivodeship, in west-central Poland.
