= Przyborów, Sulęcin County =

Przyborów
- Village
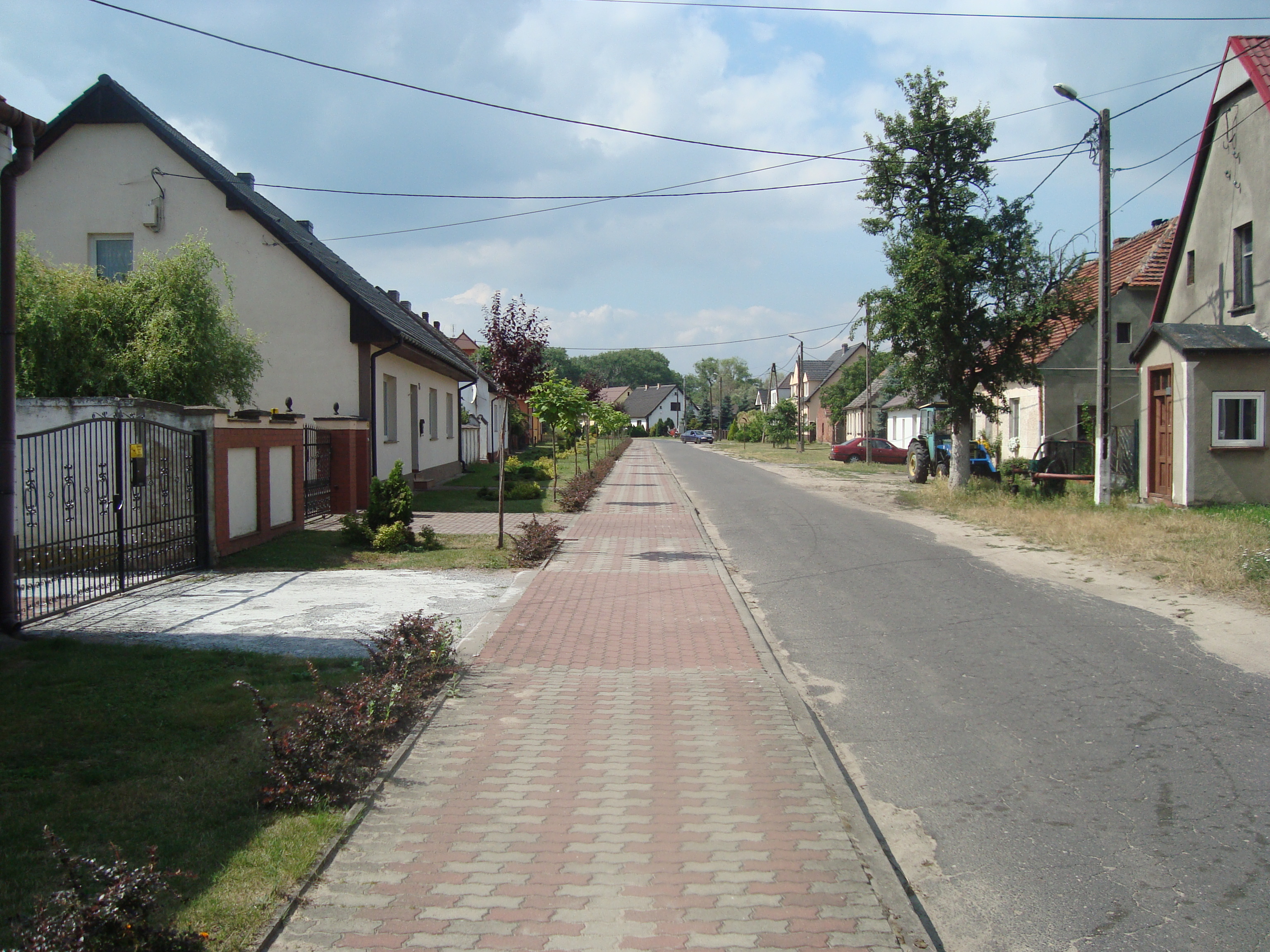

- Location within Poland
- Coordinates: 52°34′35″N 14°47′28″E
- Country: Poland
- Voivodeship: Lubusz
- County: Sulęcin
- Gmina: Słońsk

Przyborów [pʂɨˈbɔruf] is a village in the administrative district of Gmina Słońsk, within Sulęcin County, Lubusz Voivodeship, in western Poland.

== See also ==
Territorial changes of Poland after World War II
