= Zadory =

- Village
- Location within Poland
- Coordinates: 52°11′N 16°40′E
- Country: Poland
- Voivodeship: Greater Poland
- County: Kościan
- Gmina: Czempiń

Zadory [zaˈdɔrɨ] is a village in the administrative district of Gmina Czempiń, within Kościan County, Greater Poland Voivodeship, in west-central Poland.
