= Chartów =

- Village
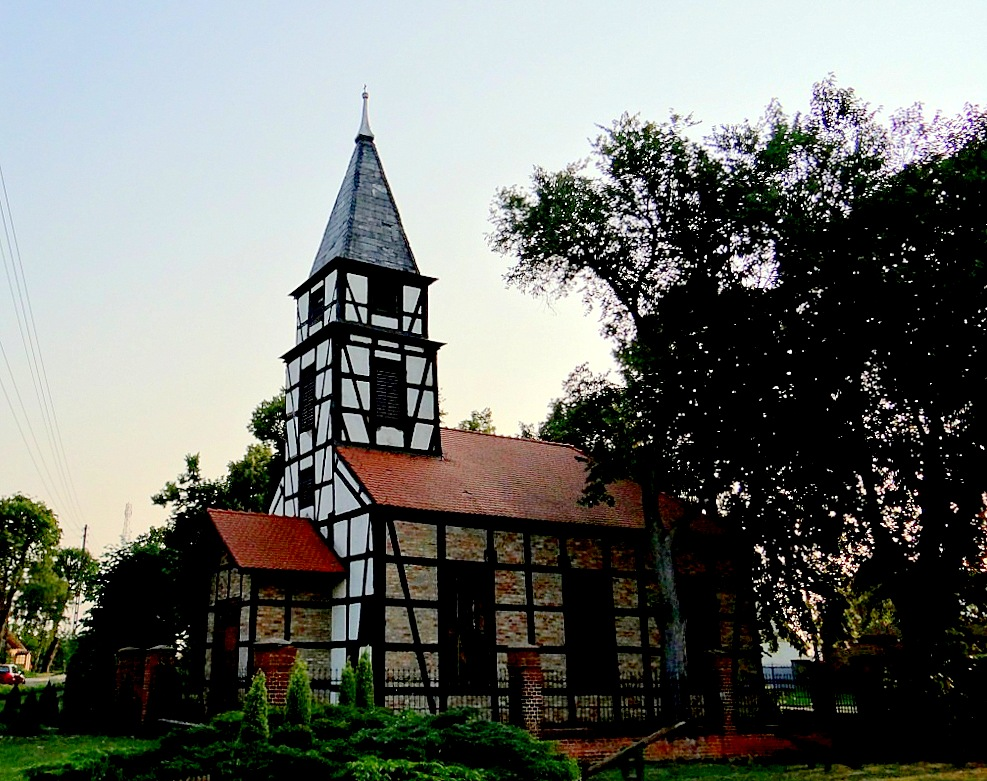
- Catholic church

- Location within Poland
- Coordinates: 52°31′04″N 14°49′25″E
- Country: Poland
- Voivodeship: Lubusz
- County: Sulęcin
- Gmina: Słońsk
- Population: 100

Chartów [ˈxartuf] is a village in the administrative district of Gmina Słońsk, within Sulęcin County, Lubusz Voivodeship, in western Poland.
