= Stare Tarnowo =

- Village
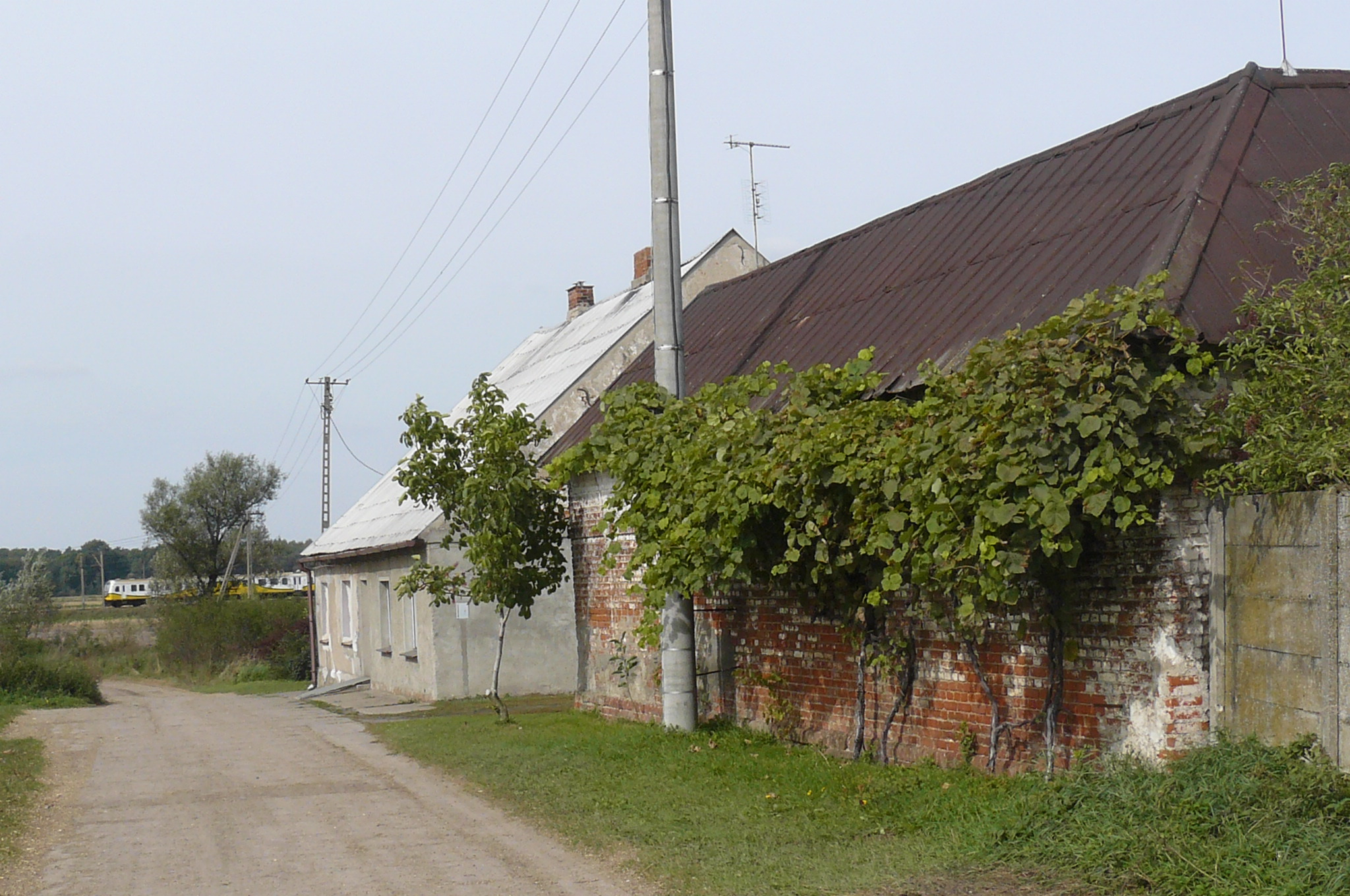

- Location within Poland
- Coordinates: 52°09′51″N 16°47′18″E
- Country: Poland
- Voivodeship: Greater Poland
- County: Kościan
- Gmina: Czempiń

Stare Tarnowo [ˈstarɛ tarˈnɔvɔ] is a village in the administrative district of Gmina Czempiń, within Kościan County, Greater Poland Voivodeship, in west-central Poland.
