= Ownice =

- Village
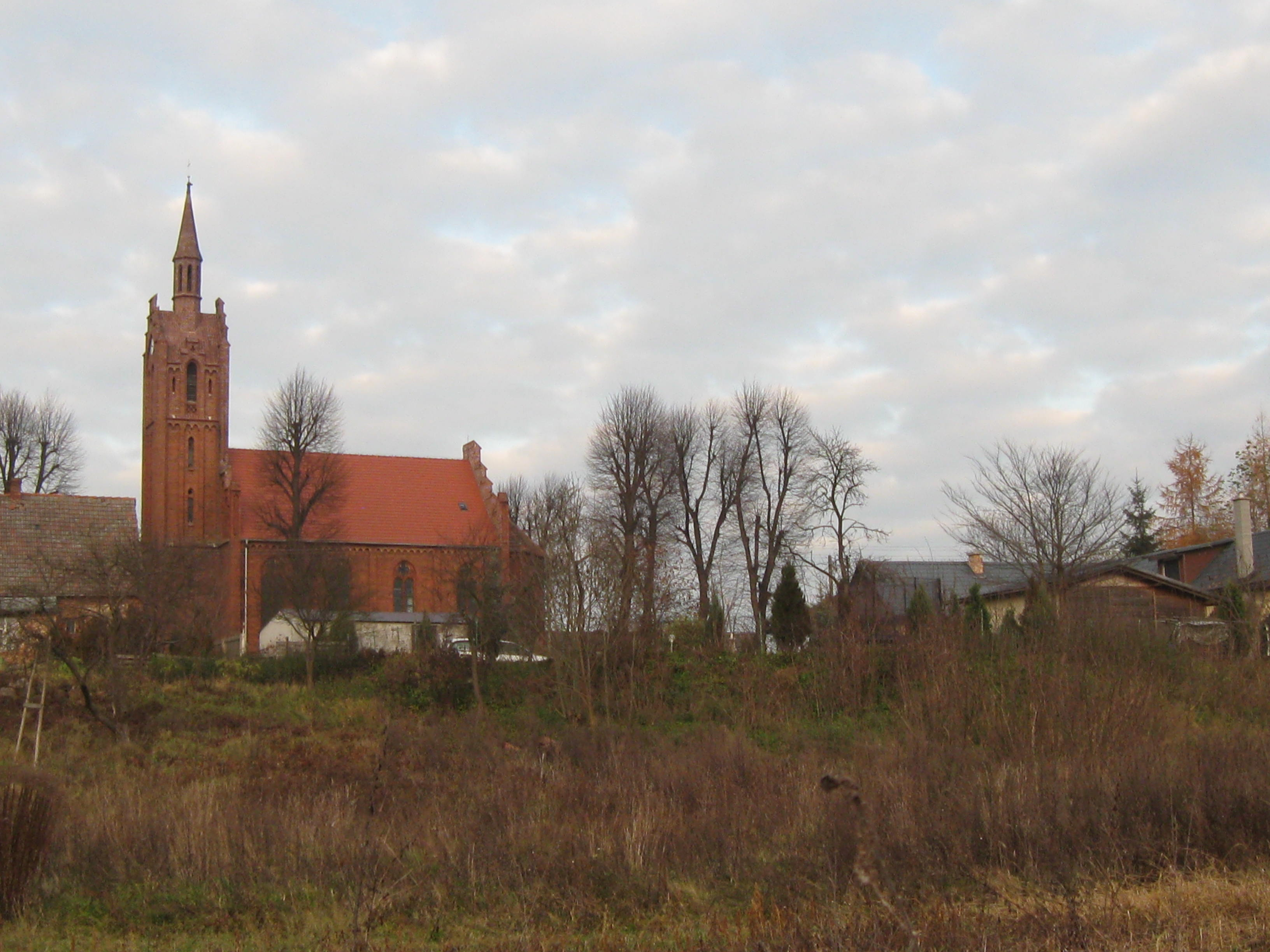

- Location within Poland
- Coordinates: 52°32′N 14°53′E
- Country: Poland
- Voivodeship: Lubusz
- County: Sulęcin
- Gmina: Słońsk

Ownice [ɔvˈnit͡sɛ] is a village in the administrative district of Gmina Słońsk, within Sulęcin County, Lubusz Voivodeship, in western Poland.
