= Gmina Czempiń =

Gmina Czempiń Czempiń Commune
- Gmina
- Coat of arms
- Interactive map of Gmina Czempiń
- Coordinates (Czempiń): 52°9′42″N 16°46′38″E
- Country: Poland
- Voivodeship: Greater Poland
- County: Kościan
- Seat: Czempiń

Area
  - Total: 142.46 km^{2} (55.00 sq mi)

Population (2011)
  - Total: 11,432
  - Density: 80.247/km^{2} (207.84/sq mi)
  - Urban: 5,277
  - Rural: 6,155
- Website: www.czempin.pl

Gmina Czempiń is an urban-rural gmina (administrative district) in Kościan County, Greater Poland Voivodeship, in west-central Poland. Its seat is the town of Czempiń, which lies approximately 13 kilometres (8 mi) north-east of Kościan and 29 km (18 mi) south of the regional capital Poznań.

The gmina covers an area of 142.46 square kilometres (55.0 sq mi), and as of 2006 its total population is 11,259 (out of which the population of Czempiń amounts to 5,135, and the population of the rural part of the gmina is 6,124).

The gmina contains part of the protected area called Chłapowski Landscape Park.

== Villages ==
Apart from the town of Czempiń, Gmina Czempiń contains the villages and settlements of Betkowo, Bieczyny, Borowo, Donatowo, Głuchowo, Gorzyce, Gorzyczki, Helenopol, Jarogniewice, Jasień, Maruszkowo, Nowe Borówko, Nowe Tarnowo, Nowy Gołębin, Piechanin, Piotrkowice, Piotrowo Drugie, Piotrowo Pierwsze, Rakówka, Roszkowo, Sierniki, Słonin, Srocko Wielkie, Stare Tarnowo, Stary Gołębin and Zadory.

== Neighbouring gminas ==
Gmina Czempiń is bordered by the gminas of Brodnica, Kościan, Krzywiń, Mosina, Śrem and Stęszew.
