= Brunhilde Hanke =

German politician (1930–2024)

Member of the State Council of the German Democratic Republic
- In office July 13, 1967 – April 5, 1990

Member of the Volkskammer
- In office October 20, 1963 – March 18, 1990

Mayor of Potsdam
- In office 1961–1984
- Preceded by: Wilhelm Rescher
- Succeeded by: Wilfried Seidel

Personal details
- Born: Brunhilde Anweiler; 23 March 1930 Erfurt, Thuringia, Germany
- Died: 13 October 2024 (aged 94) Potsdam, Brandenburg, Germany
- Party: Die Linke; Socialist Unity Party of Germany (1946–1989)
- Spouse: Helmut Hanke
- Children: Bärbel Dalichow
- Education: Parteihochschule Karl Marx
- Awards: Patriotic Order of Merit, in silver (1979); Patriotic Order of Merit, in bronze (1974)

Brunhilde Hanke (née Anweiler; 23 March 1930 – 13 October 2024) was a German politician who was mayor of Potsdam and a member of the State Council of East Germany.

== Early life ==
Hanke was born in Erfurt into a working-class family. She completed an apprenticeship as a seamstress in 1947, during which she joined the Free German Trade Union Federation. She soon also became a member of the Socialist Unity Party of Germany (SED) and its youth organisation, the Free German Youth (FDJ). In 1951–52, she studied at the Komsomol academy in Moscow. She completed a diploma in social sciences at the Parteihochschule Karl Marx in 1962.

== Political career ==
Between 1952 and 1963, Hanke was part of the FDJ's central council. Hanke became mayor of Potsdam in 1961. Her tenure as mayor was marked by the construction of 37,000 apartment units, largely in the Plattenbau style. During her mayoralty she also came into conflict with SED leadership regarding the preservation and restoration of historic buildings. Hanke remained mayor until 1984. Afterwards, from 1987, she led the local Kulturbund in Potsdam.

In 1963, Hanke was elected to the Volkskammer. In 1967, she was made a member of the State Council of the GDR, the country's collective head of state. She remained a member of both institutions until 1990.

Hanke was awarded the Patriotic Order of Merit in bronze in 1974 and in silver in 1979.

Following German reunification, Hanke became a member of the political party Die Linke.

== Death ==
Henke died in Potsdam on 13 October 2024, at the age of 94.
