= Gerhard Kratzat =

Gerhard Kratzat

Gerhard Kratzat (8 January 1909 in Burg, Dithmarschen – 12 July 1944 in Lyon) was a resistance fighter against National Socialism.

== Life ==
Johannes Gerhard Kratzat was born in 1909 in Burg (Dithmarschen). He attended the public school and its senior division, then studied with Burg's savings bank and picked up the seaman's profession. In Burg he was called the learned sailor. In the fall of 1931, he participated in the seaman's strike in the Baltic ports.

From March to July 1933, he was detained in the Sonnenburg concentration camp and tortured. For weeks, he could only take liquid food because his jaw had been dislocated by brutal blows. Only when he was already completely weakened was the case addressed by a doctor. After his release, he stayed for a long time with his parents in Burg. From 1934 to 1936 Kratzat worked for the International of Seamen and Harbour Workers (ISH) in Rotterdam and Antwerp. In the local International clubs ("Inter-clubs"), German sailors were supplied with illegal papers and questioned concerning the events in the German Reich and on the ships.

From 1937 to 1939 he held senior positions during the Spanish Civil War with the intelligence services operations for the maritime group of the Communist Party. Among other things, he was substantially involved in the repatriation of members of the English-speaking Abraham Lincoln Brigade.

In World War II he joined the French Resistance. On 10 March 1944, he was arrested in Paris by the Germans, sentenced to death for "giving aid to the enemy" by a German court martial, and executed on 12 July 1944 in Lyon.

== Remembrance ==
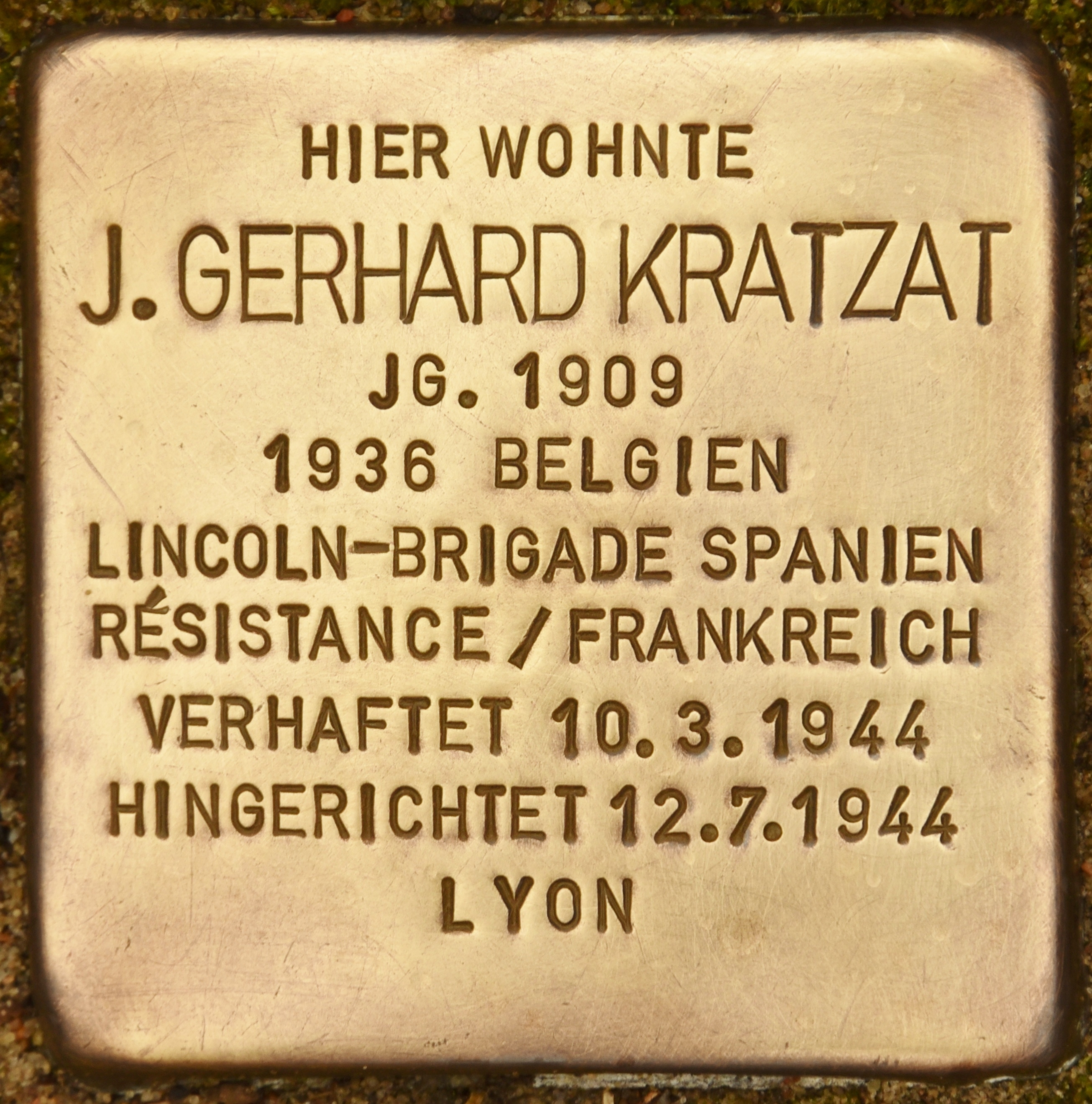
Stolperstein for Gerhard Kratzat in Garden Street in Burg (Dithmarschen)

On 30 July 2009, Gunter Demnig had a Stolperstein (stumbling block) laid in Gartenstraße 15, to the memory of Gerhard Kratzat. Gerhard Kratzat lived in Gartenstraße 17.
