= Eugène Greau =

French cyclist

Personal information
- Born: 29 May 1904 Nieul-le-Dolent, France
- Died: 20 December 1943 (aged 39) Sonnenburg concentration camp, German-occupied Poland

Cycling career
- Sport: Cycling
- Discipline: Road
- Role: Rider

Eugène Greau (29 May 1904 – 20 December 1943) was a French racing cyclist. He rode in the 1927 Tour de France. He died in the Sonnenburg concentration camp.
