= Gmina Słońsk =

Gmina Słońsk Słońsk Commune
- Gmina
- Coat of arms
- Interactive map of Gmina Słońsk
- Coordinates (Słońsk): 52°33′46″N 14°48′22″E
- Country: Poland
- Voivodeship: Lubusz
- County: Sulęcin
- Seat: Słońsk

Area
  - Total: 158.86 km^{2} (61.34 sq mi)

Population (2019-06-30)
  - Total: 4,755
  - Density: 29.93/km^{2} (77.52/sq mi)
- Website: http://www.slonsk.pl

Gmina Słońsk is a rural gmina (administrative district) in Sulęcin County, Lubusz Voivodeship, in western Poland. Its seat is the village of Słońsk, which lies approximately 25 kilometres (16 mi) north-west of Sulęcin and 36 km (22 mi) south-west of Gorzów Wielkopolski.

The gmina covers an area of 158.86 square kilometres (61.3 sq mi), and as of 2019 its total population is 4,755.

== Villages ==
Gmina Słońsk contains the villages and settlements of Budzigniew, Chartów, Głuchowo, Grodzisk, Jamno, Lemierzyce, Lemierzycko, Ownice, Polne, Przyborów and Słońsk.

== Neighbouring gminas ==
Gmina Słońsk is bordered by the town of Kostrzyn nad Odrą and by the gminas of Górzyca, Krzeszyce, Ośno Lubuskie and Witnica.

== Twin towns – sister cities ==
Gmina Słońsk is twinned with:

- Amt Schlaubetal, Germany
