= Słońsk =

- Village
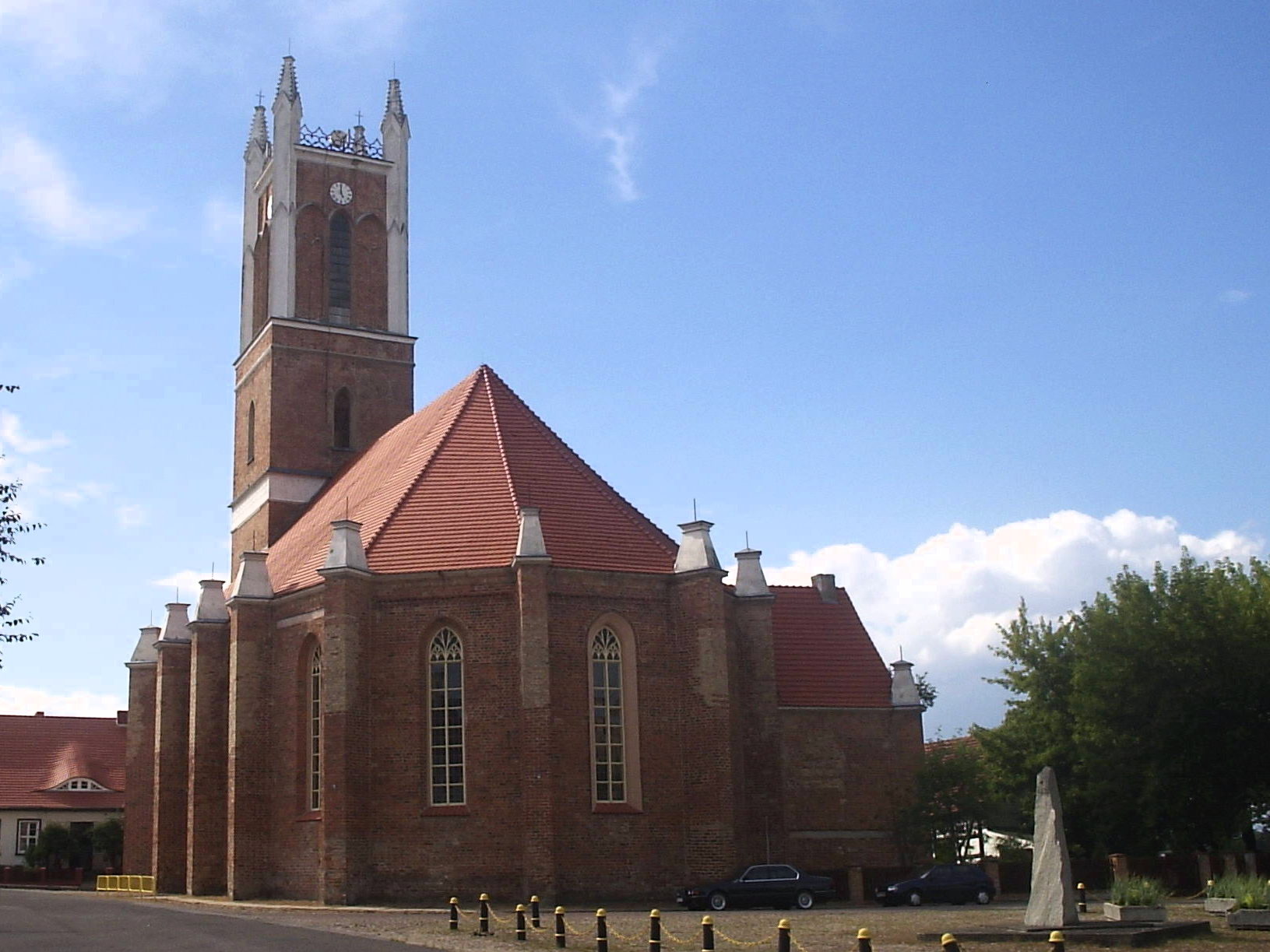
- Our Lady of Częstochowa church in Słońsk

- Coat of arms

- Location within Poland
- Coordinates: 52°33′46″N 14°48′22″E
- Country: Poland
- Voivodeship: Lubusz
- County: Sulęcin
- Gmina: Słońsk
- First mentioned: 1295
- Population: 3,000
- Time zone: UTC+1 (CET)
  - Summer (DST): UTC+2 (CEST)
- Postal code: 66-436
- Vehicle registration: FSU
- Website: http://www.slonsk.pl/

Słońsk (pronounced pronounced [swɔɲsk]; German: Sonnenburg) is a village in Sulęcin County of the Lubusz Voivodeship, in western Poland. It is located 12 kilometres (7.5 mi) east of the border crossing with Germany along national road DK22. The village lies about 25 kilometres (or 16 miles) northwest of Sulęcin and 36 kilometres (22 mi) southwest of Gorzów Wielkopolski.

The village borders Poland's Ujście Warty National Park stretching to the north. During the Second World War, it was the site of a Nazi concentration camp, now a museum.

== History ==
=== Middle Ages ===
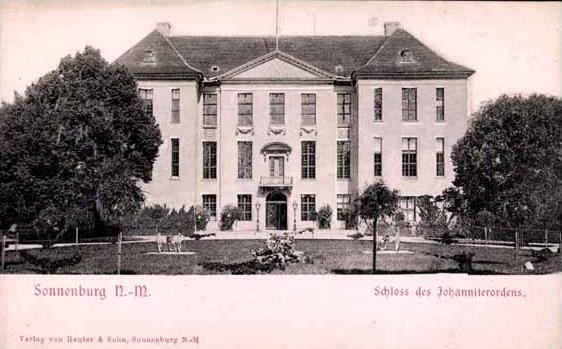
Słońsk castle before destruction

Present-day Słońsk was founded within the historic Lubusz Land, which formed part of the Kingdom of Poland since the establishment of the state in the 10th century until the mid-13th century, when it was acquired by the German Margraviate of Brandenburg. Most Slavic Polish inhabitants of the region were gradually Germanicized in the centuries that followed.

Then known as Sonnenburg, the settlement first appears in documents in 1295. The Knights Templar held lands and buildings in the town. From 1312, the Margrave of Brandenburg and the Bishop of Lebus were joint overlords of Sonnenburg. Henning and Arnold von Uechtenhagen later received Sonnenberg as a fief and built the first castle there in 1341. From 1373 to 1415 it was part of the Bohemian (Czech) Crown. From the 15th century, the town maintained a close connection with the Order of Saint John (the Knights Hospitaller), who had purchased it from Frederick I, Elector of Brandenburg. The castle became the seat of the Bailiwick of Brandenburg of the Order, which greatly enlarged the town, building a new church (between 1474 and 1522), a new castle (between 1545 and 1564), and a model hospital (in the 19th century).

=== Modern era ===
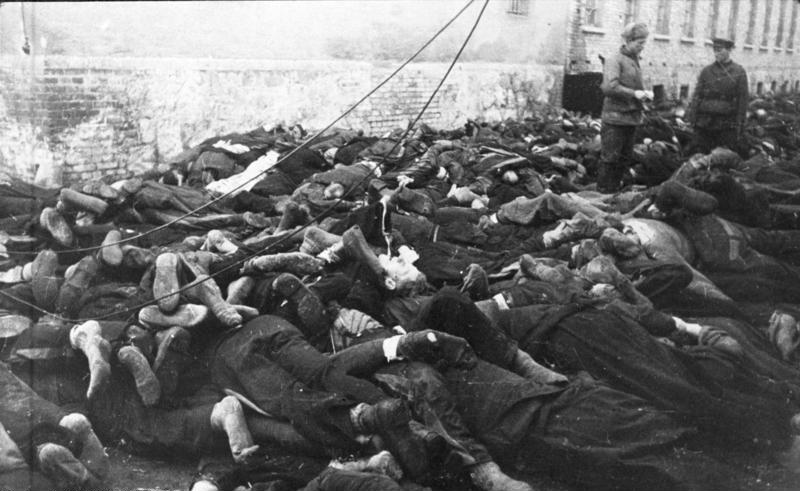
Victims of the Sonnenburg concentration camp found in 1945 by the Soviets

From the 18th century the town formed part of Prussia, and from 1871 to 1945 it also formed part of Germany. A severe prison was built in the town in 1832. It held such Polish fighters for independence as Karol Libelt and Bronisław Dąbrowski (the son of General Jan Henryk Dąbrowski).

In 1933, German authorities converted the prison into the Sonnenburg concentration camp, in which such anti-Nazi activists as Carl von Ossietzky and Hans Litten were held. During World War II, Polish defenders of the Poznań citadel were held in the prison after capture during the invasion of Poland in 1939, and in 1944 some of the former fighters in the Warsaw Uprising were incarcerated there. During the war also Frenchmen, Luxembourgers, Dutchmen, Danes, Norwegians, Belgians, Czechs, Yugoslavs, Slovaks, Bulgarians, Austrians, the Swiss, Estonians, Russians and Spaniards were held in the camp.

Before withdrawal, during the night of 30–31 January 1945, the SS executed 819 political prisoners from many European countries at Sonnenburg.

=== After World War II ===
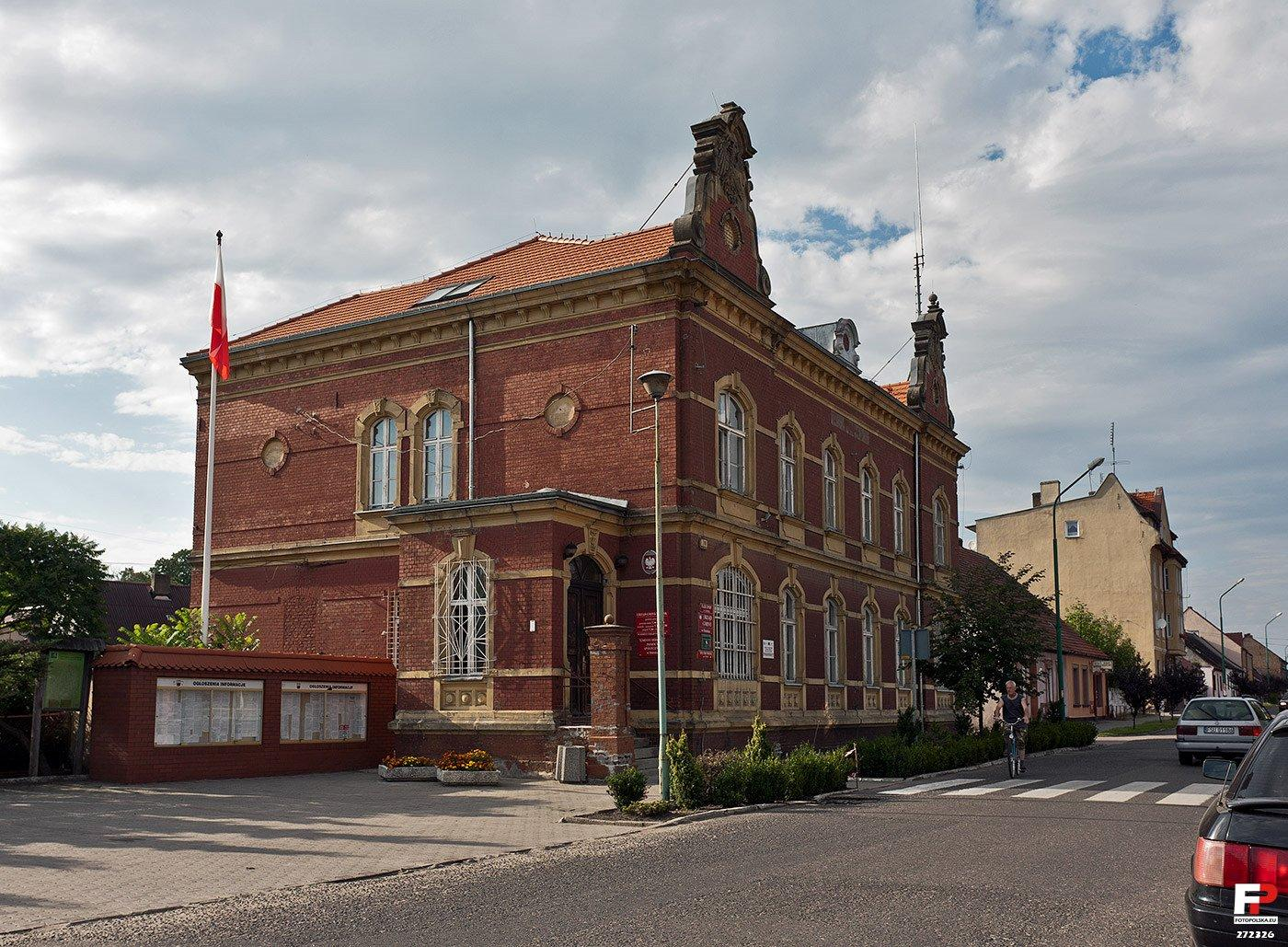
Gmina office

Sonnenburg (Słońsk) was captured by the Soviet Red Army in the spring of 1945 as the Second World War in Europe drew to a close. During the Potsdam Conference held from 17 July to 2 August 1945 Sonnenburg along with the rest of the recovered territories was awarded to Poland, and renamed legally as Słońsk. Most of the German inhabitants fled ahead of the front or were expelled soon thereafter. The town was repopulated with the Poles expelled by the Soviet Union from the formerly Polish territories of Kresy Wschodnie, and by settlers from central Poland. In 1947 Słońsk lost its town rights and was given the status of a village due to small population size.

A museum dedicated to the victims of the Nazi German concentration camp was founded in 1974. In 2015, an official commemoration ceremony of the victims of the camp, among which were 91 Luxembourgers, was attended by the highest representatives of Luxembourg, Grand Duke Henri and Prime Minister Xavier Bettel.

== Sports ==
The local football club is Warta Słońsk. It competes in the lower leagues.
