= Helenopol, Kościan County =

Helenopol
- Village
- Location within Poland
- Coordinates: 52°7′26″N 16°48′24″E
- Country: Poland
- Voivodeship: Greater Poland
- County: Kościan
- Gmina: Czempiń

Helenopol [xɛlɛˈnɔpɔl] is a village in the administrative district of Gmina Czempiń, within Kościan County, Greater Poland Voivodeship, in west-central Poland.
