= Wilfried Seidel =

German politician

Mayor of Potsdam
- In office 1984–1989
- Preceded by: Brunhilde Hanke
- Succeeded by: Manfred Bille

Personal details
- Born: 21 August 1939 (age 87) Bannewitz, Nazi Germany
- Party: Socialist Unity Party of Germany (1960–1989)
- Education: Parteihochschule Karl Marx; Technical University of Dresden

Military service
- Allegiance: East Germany
- Branch/service: National People's Army
- Years of service: 1957–1960

Wilfried Seidel (born 21 August 1939) is a former German politician. Seidel was mayor of Potsdam between 1984 and 1989.

== Life ==
Seidel was born on 21 August 1939 in Bannewitz. After graduating high school in 1957, Seidel enlisted in the National People's Army where he would serve until 1960. In 1960, he joined the Socialist Unity Party of Germany (SED). In the same year, Seidel began studying at the "Rudolf Diesel" engineering school in Meißen. After graduating in 1963, he worked as an industrial eingineer. Between 1965 and 1966, Seidel attended a district party school of the Socialist Unity Party.

Seidel acquired his first political position in 1970, when he became deputy chairman of the Zossen regional government. In 1976 he studied industrial eingineering and industrial economics at the Technical University of Dresden. Seidel's final educational undertaking was a degree in social science at the Parteihochschule Karl Marx. In 1979, Seidel became chairman of the Rathenow regional government. He would hold this post until 1984.

In 1984, Seidel became mayor of Potsdam, succeeding Brunhilde Hanke. During his tenure as mayor, Potsdam signed a sister city agreement with Bonn. A minor diplomatic incident occurred during the diplomatic tour surrounding the sister city agreement. While visiting Potsdam, the mayor of Bonn, Hans Daniels, made critical remarks about the East German government on live television. Seidel was chastised by party officials for his handling of the incident. Daniels later followed up his remarks by comparing the German Democratic Republic to Apartheid South Africa. As a result, diplomatic relations between the two cities were dampened until German reunification, although the sister city agreement remained in place.

After being dismissed from his post as mayor of Potsdam in 1989, Seidel was employed as a chairman of the Bezirk Potsdam Workers' and Peasants' Inspection, an economic planning institution. He held this role from June 1989 to December 1989. In 1990, Siedel was director of public housing in Stahnsdorf-Kleinmachnow. Following German reunification, he worked as a self-employed insurance broker.

== 1989 Municipal election fraud scandal ==
Seidel was involved in tampering with the May 1989 East German municipal elections in Potsdam. He, along with several other local politicians arranged to underreport the number of 'against' votes against the incumbent administration. Approximately 2,400 'against' votes were not reported to the Electoral Commission of the German Democratic Republic. During the vote tabulation process, discrepancies in the results were reported to East German authorities by election scrutineers. On 22 May 1989 Seidel was removed from office, along with a third of Potsdam city councillors. The Socialist Unity Party (SED) then appointed Manfred Bille to succeed Seidel as mayor of Potsdam. The SED publicly accused Siedel of being the ringleader of the plot. Seidel was arrested by the East German Volkspolizei in June 1990, together with his deputy Marlies Nopens and former city councillor Lothar Holz. Harry Klapproth, one of the other potential co-defendants, had committed suicide several weeks prior after being interviewed by the police. Although originally charged by East German authorities, Seidel's case was prosecuted following German reunification in September 1991. Seidel and his co-defendants received support from the conservative politician Lothar de Maizière, who called for amnesty. Seidel pled guilty and was received eight months of probation and a fine.
