= Piotrowo Pierwsze =

- Village
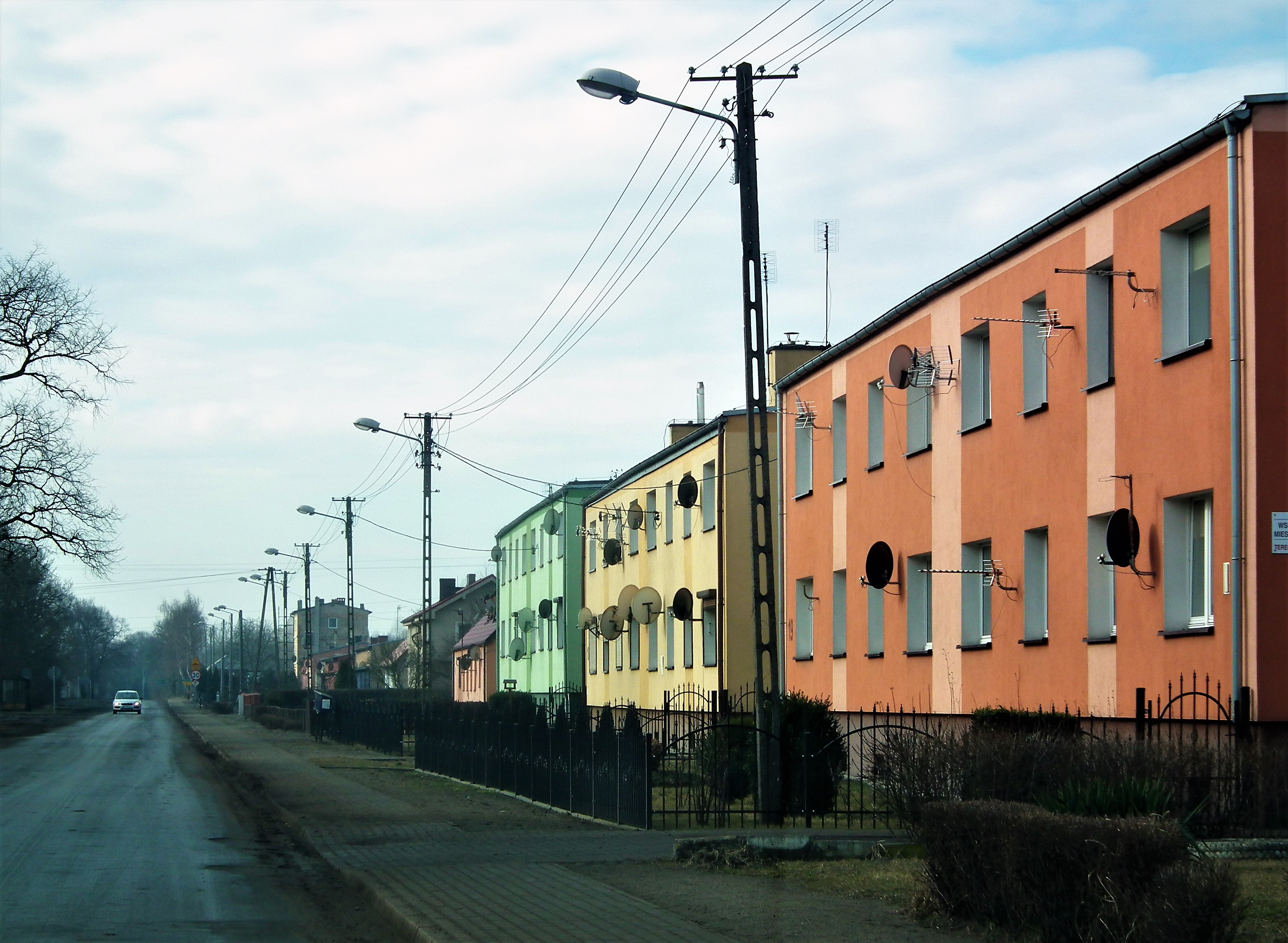
- Roadside houses in Piotrowo Pierwsze

- Location within Poland
- Coordinates: 52°11′20″N 16°41′18″E
- Country: Poland
- Voivodeship: Greater Poland
- County: Kościan
- Gmina: Czempiń

Piotrowo Pierwsze [pjɔˈtrɔvɔ ˈpjɛrfʂɛ] is a village in the administrative district of Gmina Czempiń, within Kościan County, Greater Poland Voivodeship, in west-central Poland.
