= Roszkowo, Kościan County =

Roszkowo
- Village
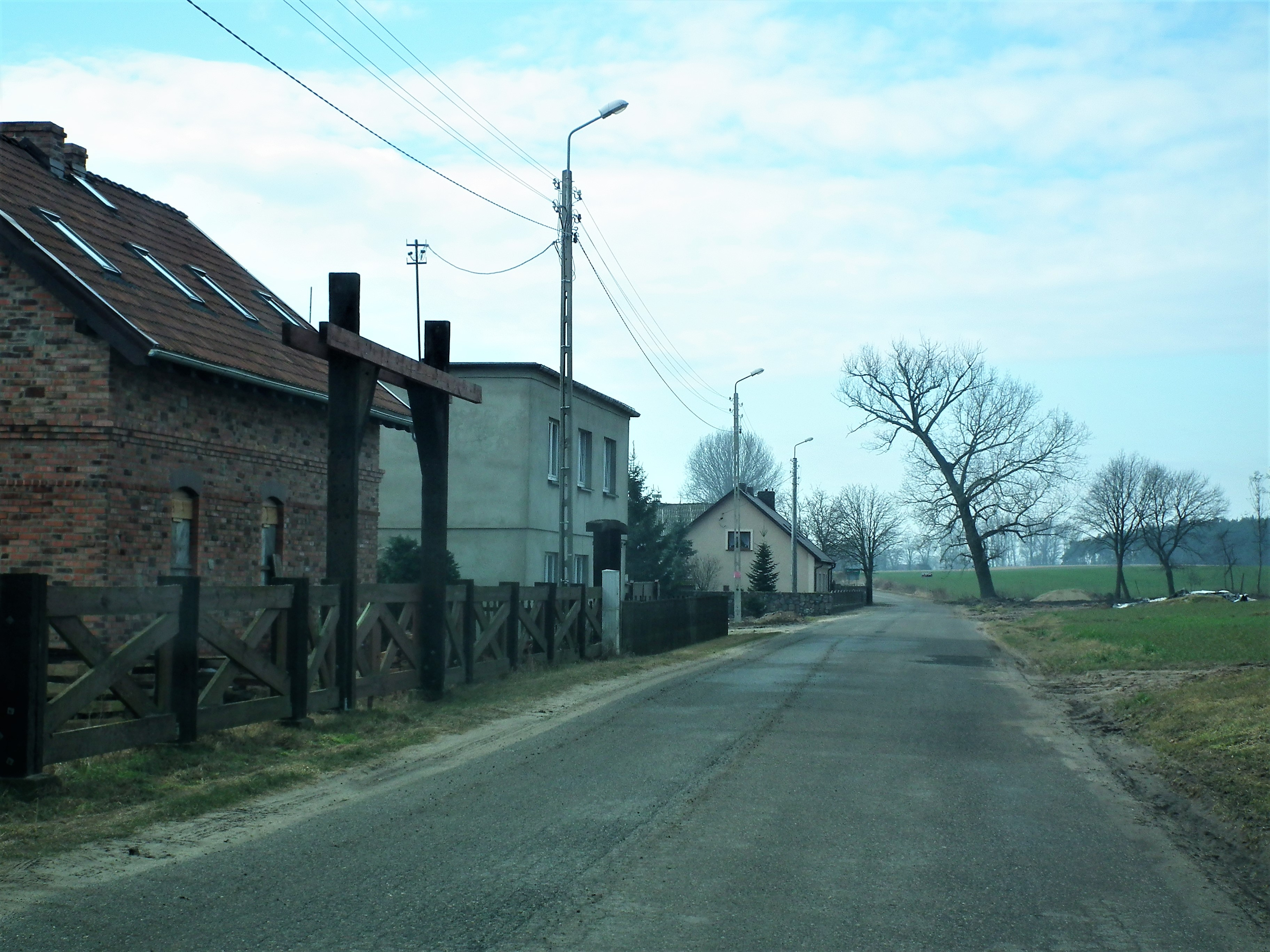
- House by the roadside in Roszkowo

- Location within Poland
- Coordinates: 52°09′42″N 16°37′28″E
- Country: Poland
- Voivodeship: Greater Poland
- County: Kościan
- Gmina: Czempiń

Roszkowo [rɔʂˈkɔvɔ] is a village in an administrative district of Gmina Czempiń, within Kościan County, Greater Poland Voivodeship, in west-central Poland.
