= Lemierzycko =

- Village
- Location within Poland
- Coordinates: 52°36′06″N 14°55′54″E
- Country: Poland
- Voivodeship: Lubusz
- County: Sulęcin
- Gmina: Słońsk

Lemierzycko, known as Lubomierzycko until 2012, is a village in the administrative district of Gmina Słońsk, within Sulęcin County, Lubusz Voivodeship, in western Poland.
