= Lemierzyce =

- Village
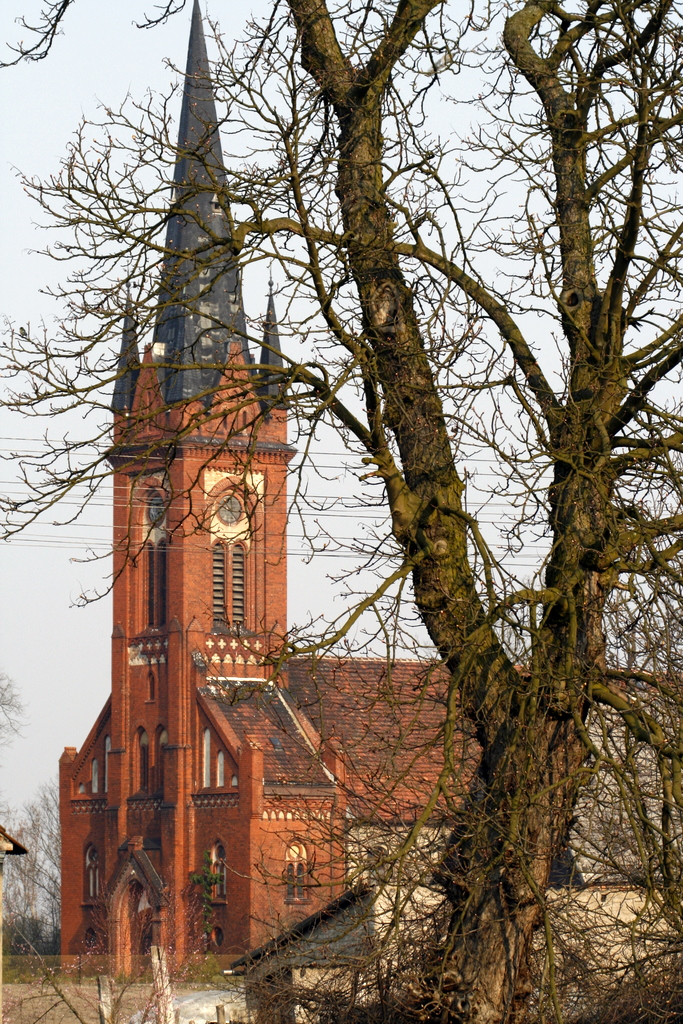
- Catholic church

- Location within Poland
- Coordinates: 52°33′N 14°55′E
- Country: Poland
- Voivodeship: Lubusz
- County: Sulęcin
- Gmina: Słońsk
- Population: 630

Lemierzyce [lɛmjɛˈʐɨt͡sɛ] is a village in the administrative district of Gmina Słońsk, within Sulęcin County, Lubusz Voivodeship, in western Poland.
