= Budzigniew =

- Village
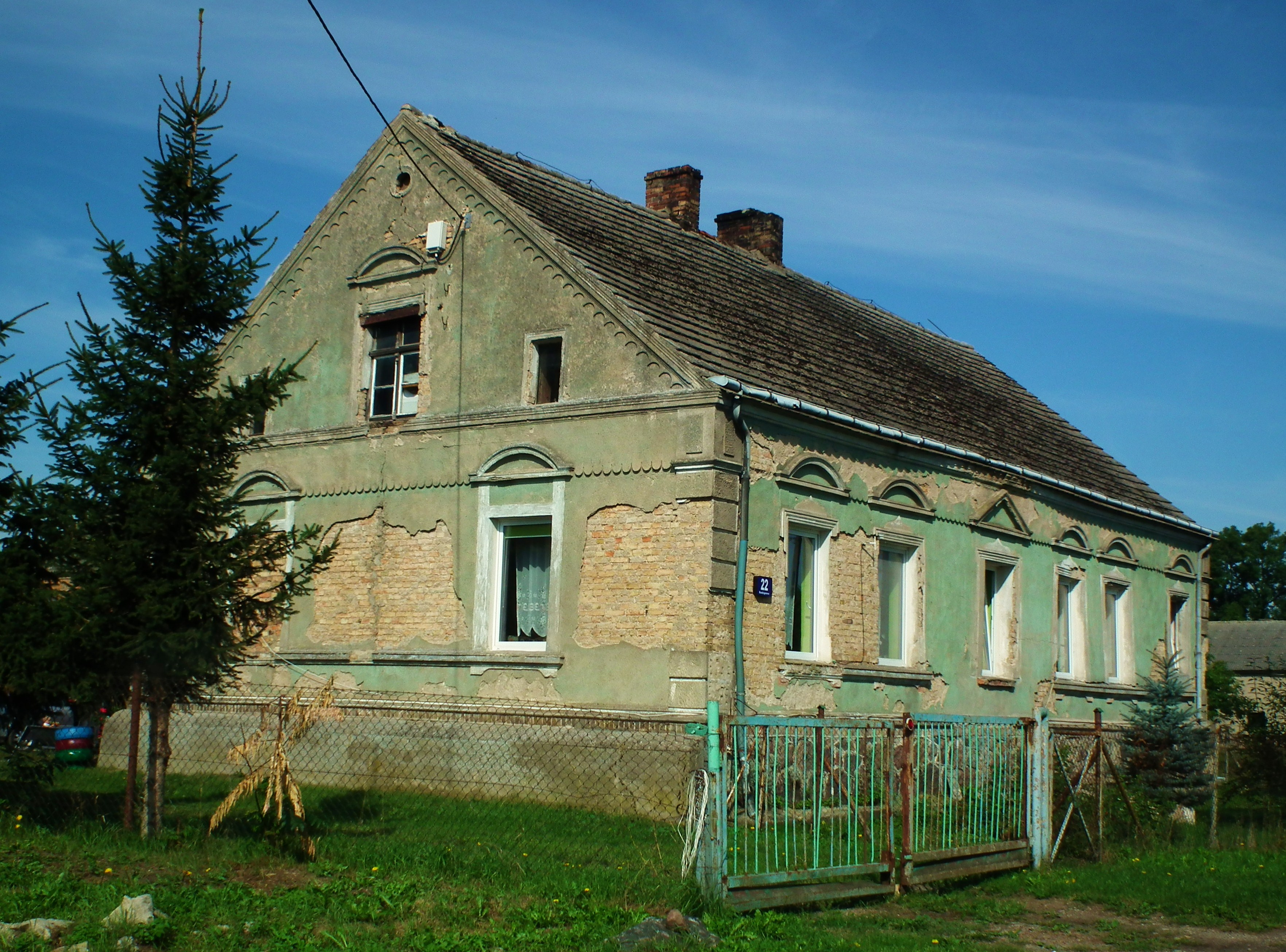
- Green house in Budzigniew

- Coat of arms

- Location within Poland
- Coordinates: 52°36′48″N 14°53′37″E
- Country: Poland
- Voivodeship: Lubusz
- County: Sulęcin
- Gmina: Słońsk

Budzigniew [buˈd͡ʑiɡɲɛf] is a village in the administrative district of Gmina Słońsk, within Sulęcin County, Lubusz Voivodeship, in western Poland.
