= Rakówka, Greater Poland Voivodeship =

Rakówka
- Village
- Location within Poland
- Coordinates: 52°06′43″N 16°57′19″E
- Country: Poland
- Voivodeship: Greater Poland
- County: Kościan
- Gmina: Czempiń

Rakówka [raˈkufka] is a village in the administrative district of Gmina Czempiń, within Kościan County, Greater Poland Voivodeship, in west-central Poland.
