= Rashevsky =

Rashevsky/Rashevskaya is a Russian-language surname. Polish equivanlent: Raszewski

- Nicolas Rashevsky, Russian American mathematician
- Sergei Rashevsky, Russian footballer
- Pyotr Rashevsky, the namesake of the Chow–Rashevsky theorem
- Zinaida Rashevskaya (1896—1963), mistress and morganatic wife of Grand Duke Boris Vladimirovich of Russia

== See also ==
- Reshevsky
