= Raszewski =

Raszewski/Raszewska is a Polish surname. Russian equivalent: Rashevsky.

- Kazimierz Raszewski
- Zbigniew Raszewski (1925–1982), Polish writer, including historian
