= Grodzisk, Lubusz Voivodeship =

Grodzisk
- Village
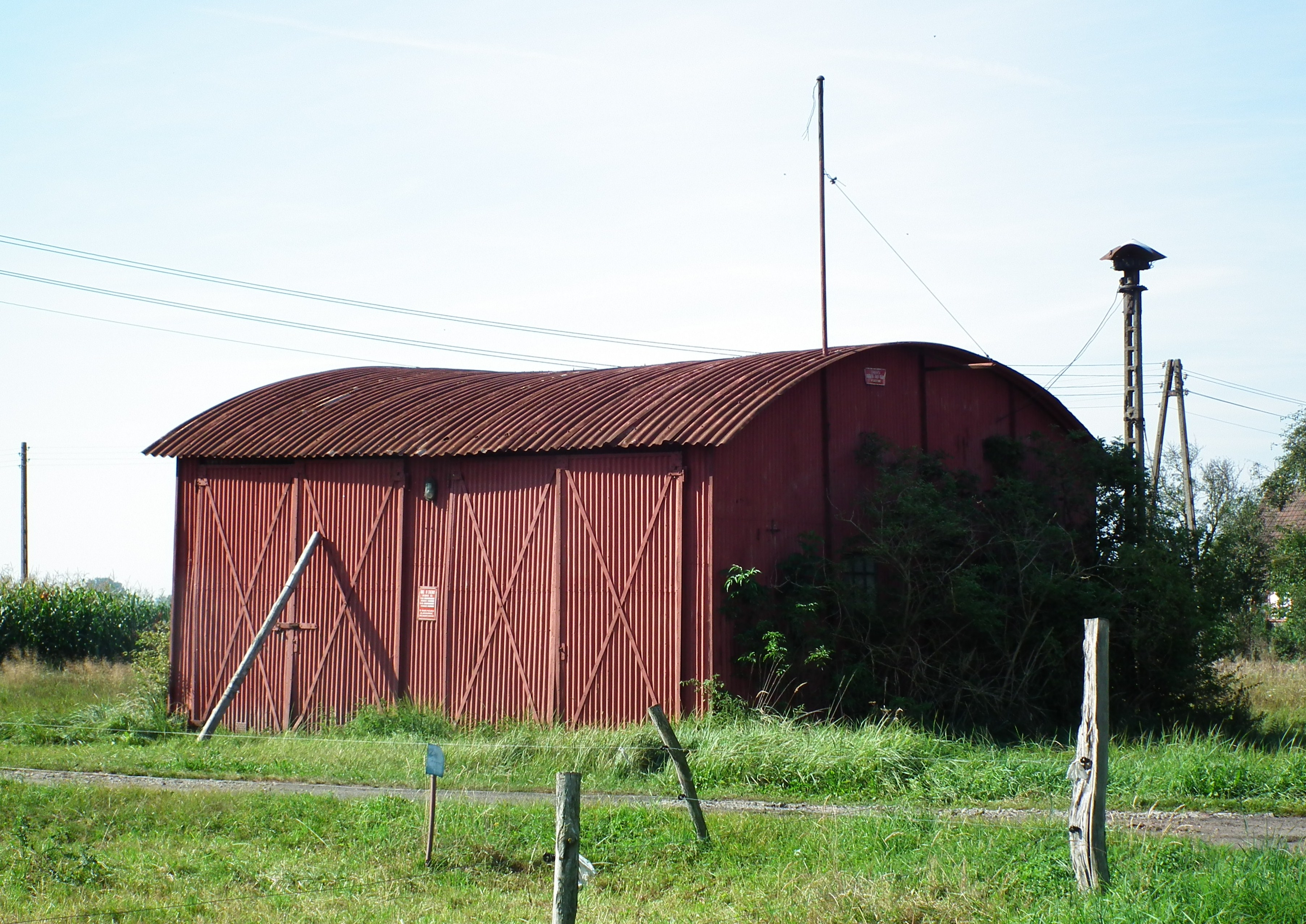
- Fire station in Grodzisk

- Location within Poland
- Coordinates: 52°36′27″N 14°55′32″E
- Country: Poland
- Voivodeship: Lubusz
- County: Sulęcin
- Gmina: Słońsk

Grodzisk [ˈɡrɔd͡ʑisk] is a village in the administrative district of Gmina Słońsk, within Sulęcin County, Lubusz Voivodeship, in western Poland.
