= Stein Prison massacre =

Late-WWII war crime committed in Austria

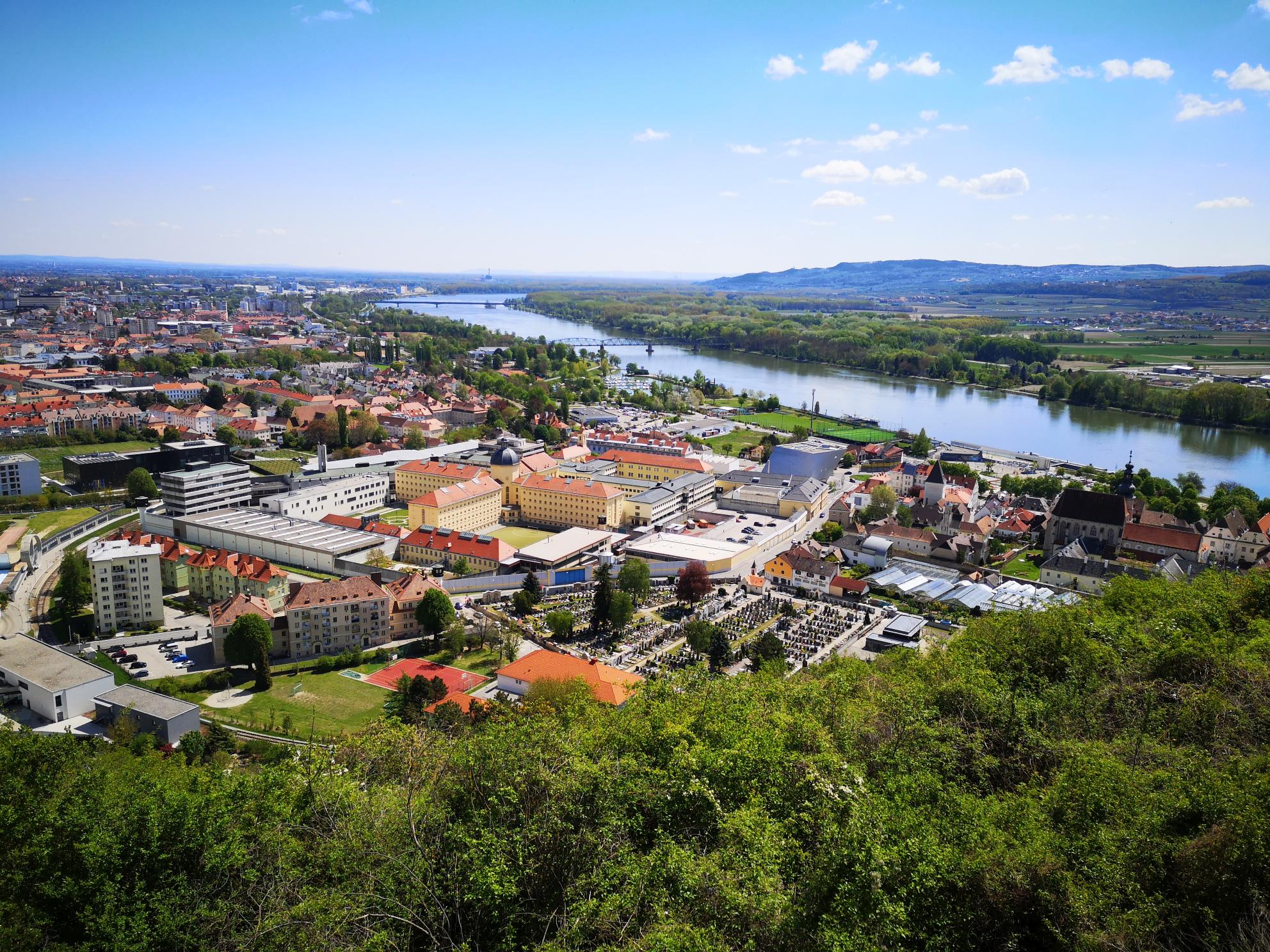
Stein Prison (2021)

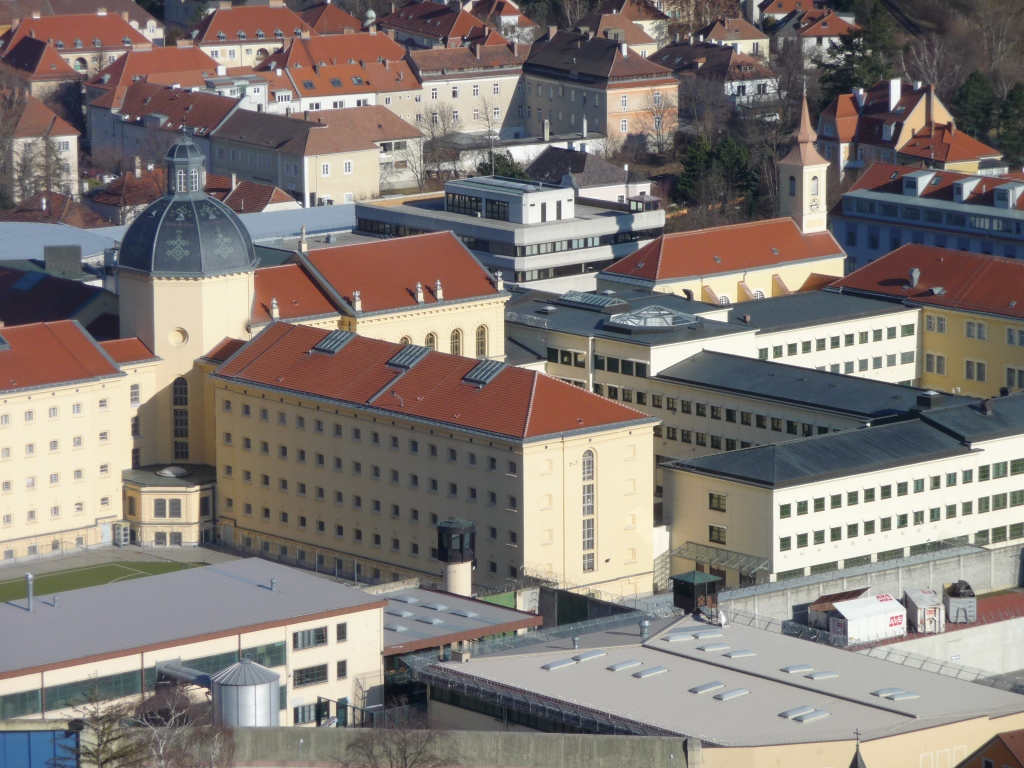
Stein Prison detail (2012)

The Stein Prison massacre and the subsequent Krems 'hare hunt' (collectively referred to as the Krems prisoner murders) were crimes committed in Nazi Austria in and around Krems an der Donau, in which between 400 and 500 inmates (many of them political prisoners) of Stein Prison, as well as several judicial officers and civilians, were summarily executed or disappeared between 6 April 1945 and the following days. At the direction of Nazi Party officials, the murders were primarily carried-out by Wehrmacht and Waffen-SS troops, assisted by prison guards, police personnel and militiamen of the Volkssturm.

In the post-war period, the Austrian and West German judicial systems categorized criminal acts committed during the final stages of the Second World War as 'end-phase crimes' (Endphaseverbrechen), a classification that was frequently regarded as a mitigating factor in legal proceedings. Fifteen individuals were ultimately criminally charged concerning the massacre; Five were sentenced to death, five were sentenced to life imprisonment, one was sentenced to a three-year prison sentence, and four were acquitted. Several others evaded criminal charges by committing suicide.

== Background ==
Stein Prison is located in Stein an der Donau about 80 km west of Vienna. After the Anschluss (Nazi German annexation of Austria) in 1938, the correctional facility which had existed since 1851, was given the designation of a Zuchthaus by the Reich Ministry of Justice. Serving a sentence in a Zuchthaus was the strictest form of penal system in the German Reich in terms of prison conditions, compulsory labour and the rights of the inmates.

Stein Prison, which had a capacity of around 1000 inmates, was for men only. In addition to Stein Prison, the city of Krems an der Donau had another prison, the Krems Prison, with a capacity of around 200 male and female inmates. In 1945, the Krems Prison maintained two small outlets in the villages of Hörfarth and Oberfucha.

At the time, the inmate population of Stein Prison comprised individuals convicted of a wide range of criminal and political offences. Among the criminal categories, property-related crimes such as theft, burglary and the handling of stolen goods accounted for the largest share. These were followed by military offences, including desertion and breaches of guard duty, as well as violent offences such as murder, manslaughter, robbery and rape. Economic crimes, particularly infractions against wartime price control regulations, were also represented. Approximately 20 percent of the inmate population had been imprisoned for acts of civil or political resistance, frequently prosecuted under charges of high treason. These acts included the dissemination of anti-regime leaflets and the collection of donations for the imprisoned individuals. Additional detainees had been convicted for resistance activities against German occupation in Wehrmacht-controlled territories. Roughly ten percent of prisoners had been sentenced for offences such as undermining military morale (Wehrkraftzersetzung), sabotage, listening to foreign radio broadcasts or making politically subversive statements (Heimtücke). The political prisoner cohort included opponents of National Socialism from a variety of ideological backgrounds, notably communists, social democrats, and Christian socialists.

Proportion of prisoners per offence category
Property offence	31.9%
High treason	19.6%
Military offence	10.5%
Violent offence	7.3%
Resistance to German occupation	6.6%
Economic crime	5.5%
Unauthorised possession of weapons	4.6%
"Undermining the war effort"	4.2%
Sabotage	3.0%
Homosexuality (Note: See: Persecution of homosexuals in Nazi Germany)	2.7%
Radio-based crime (Note: Listening to foreign radio broadcasts or re-broadcasting foreign stations' news; Refer to Rundfunkverbrechen)	2.4%
Other offence(s)	1.5%
Malice (Note: A catch-all charge which the Nazi German government could essentially utilize against anyone, but especially those deemed "social outcasts" or "asocial;" Its legal framework was established via the Verordnung zur Abwehr heimtückischer Diskreditierung der nationalen Regierung (Malicious Practices Act of 1933))	0.3%

Of the 1,849 prisoners detained in Stein at the beginning of April 1945, the majority came from the territory of present-day Austria (723 men), from Germany (105), Greece (350), Yugoslavia (274), the Czech Republic (189), Italy (93) and France (49). Other nations account for the remaining 66 individuals.

In the final months of 1944, as Allied forces advanced from both the eastern and western fronts, the Reich Ministry of Justice in Berlin initiated deliberations concerning the handling of inmates in National Socialist penal institutions 'in the event of enemy approach.' These considerations culminated in the issuance of a directive in February 1945, which was disseminated to all prison directors. The directive was marked by considerable vagueness and lack of specificity. It stipulated that only inmates serving short-term sentences were to be released, while foreign nationals and individuals classified as 'asocial' or 'politically dangerous' were to be transferred under armed guard away from the frontline. In cases where evacuation proved unfeasible, prisoners were to be handed over to the police 'for elimination' or otherwise 'rendered harmless' through execution by prison personnel. However, at Stein Prison, no evacuation order was received from Berlin despite the imminent threat posed by the advancing Red Army, which was already nearing Vienna by early April 1945.

As a result of the onset of the Vienna offensive and the consequent requisitioning of all available rail and river transport capacities by both military and civilian authorities, all own attempts of the director of Stein Prison, Franz Kodré, to evacuate the approximately 1,800 to 2,000 inmates westward proved unsuccessful. Compounding the situation was the imminent depletion of food supplies within the facility. In order to avoid the prospect of being compelled to execute the prisoners and in a notably broad interpretation of directives issued from Berlin and the regional administration of Niederdonau, Kodré initially ordered the release of approximately 80 to 100 inmates convicted of non-political offences on 5 April. This was followed, on the morning of 6 April, by the release of all remaining prisoners, including the political detainees. Simultaneously, the director of the Krems Prison ordered the release of inmates from the main detention centre in Krems as well as its satellite facilities in Hörfarth and Oberfucha.

In light of the presence of Soviet forces operating directly south of Vienna, the evacuation of the Vienna-Josefstadt Prison commenced concurrently on 6 April 1945. As part of this process, political prisoners were released, among them Leopold Figl, who would later serve as Federal Chancellor of Austria.

== The events at Stein Prison ==
On the morning of 6 April, the inmates of Stein Prison were removed from their cells and informed of their impending release. This announcement created an atmosphere of optimism and relief among the prisoners. However, resistance to the release emerged from among the National Socialist loyalists within the prison staff. Some guards, opposed to the prison director's decision, engaged in passive resistance and failed to maintain order during the distribution of inmates' personal belongings, which led to chaotic conditions.

In an effort to restore order and ensure the safety of the release process, Johann Lang, inspector of judicial administration, authorized the arming of trusted prisoners with rifles.This measure proved effective and the release proceeded in an orderly manner. No acts of violence were reported against either inmates or guards. As the morning progressed, hundreds of former prisoners departed the facility on foot, although most lacked formal release documentation.

In the late morning, Nazi-affiliated prison personnel contacted Anton Wilthum,, the NSDAP Kreisleiter (District Leader) of Krems, to report what they described as a 'prison uprising'. Gauleiter (Regional Leader) Hugo Jury, who was present in Krems at the time, was also informed. In response, emergency units of the Schutzpolizei (Nazi German state security police), the local Volkssturm (lit. 'People's Storm,' often translated as Home Guard or 'People's Militia'), the Wehrmacht garrison and the Waffen-SS were dispatched to Stein. Upon arrival, these forces encountered no signs of an uprising, but their presence created considerable anxiety among the remaining inmates. The Volkssturm contingent was under the command of Kreisstabsführer des Kremser Volkssturms (District Chief of Staff of the Krems Militia) and SA-Standartenführer (Colonel of the Sturmabteilung) Leo Pilz, while the Wehrmacht detachment—composed of German Army combat engineers—was led by Major Werner Pribil. Pribil was accompanied by Oberleutnant (First Lieutenant) Lorenz Sonderer, a Gebirgsjäger (mountain infantry) officer and committed National Socialist, who had just arrived in Krems. Sonderer had been appointed as a 'special representative' for Heeresgruppe Süd (Army Group South), charged with maintaining order and discipline 'by all necessary means.'

Despite explanations from the prison officials Kodré and Lang—who argued that the release had been authorized by both the judicial administration and NSDAP Regierungspräsident (Regional President) of Niederdonau and SS-Brigadeführer (Brigadier General of the Schutzstaffel) Erich Gruber—the military units proceeded to cordon off the area and force the remaining inmates back into the prison compound. Kodré, Lang and their loyal colleagues Johann Bölz and Heinrich Lassky were arrested. The makeshift inmate security units were disarmed. Meanwhile, Deputy Director Alois Baumgartner withheld a letter from Regional President Gruber that could have confirmed the legitimacy of the release order.

As panic spread among the prisoners, many sought refuge in the courtyards, locking gates behind them. Pilz, accompanied by certain guards, entered the prison interior and deployed hand grenades among the inmates, opening the gates to military units. The Waffen-SS and Wehrmacht forces immediately commenced indiscriminate gunfire using rifles, pistols and machine guns. Dozens of unarmed prisoners were killed in the courtyards. Armed units then conducted sweeps through the prison wings, executing inmates found in hiding. Wounded prisoners were forcibly removed from the infirmary and summarily executed outdoors. Only those who had been returned to their cells by courageous guards, thereby creating the appearance that they had never been part of the release, were spared.

District Leader Wilthum, upon arriving at the scene, ordered the execution of Kodré, Lang, Bölz and Lassky, allegedly on the direct instruction of Gauleiter Jury. The four were accused of dereliction of duty and of enabling the supposed uprising. They were executed without trial by firing squad against the prison wall, with the personal participation of the mayor of Krems, Franz Retter. A summary court martial was fabricated post facto as a pretext for the killings. Two mass graves were excavated on the prison grounds to inter the victims of the massacre. Due to insufficient space, an undetermined number of corpses were transported to the Danube River and disposed of in the water. During an exhumation in 1950, a total of 248 bodies were recovered from the burial pits.

A headcount conducted the day after the massacre recorded 1,074 surviving prisoners. Approximately 200 inmates serving sentences of up to five years were formally released on 7 and 8 April. On 8 April, around 800 prisoners—along with detainees from the Krems and Göllersdorf correctional facilities—were loaded into barges and transported up the Danube under guard to detention centres in Bavaria, including Munich Stadelheim, Bernau, Pocking, and Suben am Inn. These prisoners were eventually liberated by American forces. Approximately 50 sick or injured inmates remained in Stein and were not freed until 9 May 1945, upon the arrival of Red Army troops.

== The 'Krems hare hunt' ==
Concurrent with the violent suppression of inmates within Stein Prison on 6 April 1945, units of the Wehrmacht and Waffen-SS initiated extensive manhunts in the surrounding areas to locate and recapture released prisoners. These operations were supported by personnel from local police stations and contingents of the Volkssturm drawn from nearby villages. Many of the released inmates, still clad in their prison uniforms and unaware of the escalation of violence at the prison, believed themselves to be lawfully freed. Consequently, they made no effort to hide, rendering them vulnerable to summary apprehension and execution.

There is no conclusive evidence of a centralized directive mandating the execution of recaptured prisoners. The fate of individuals largely depended on the disposition of those who detained them. Numerous killings of former prisoners occurred in the hours and days following their release:

- In Spitz an der Donau, two former inmates were killed by unknown assailants during their westward journey.
- South of Krems, in the vicinity of the military barracks in Mautern an der Donau, three to four prisoners were shot on the afternoon of 6 April 1945. Their bodies were left unburied at the site.
- In the municipality of Furth bei Göttweig, students from the Nationalpolitische Erziehungsanstalt (NAPOLA) housed at Göttweig Abbey were mobilized by the local Volkssturm to participate in the search for prisoners. In the village of Aigen, a Waffen-SS soldier executed at least two prisoners in the presence of a NAPOLA student.
- On the slopes east of Göttweig Abbey, near the abandoned Panholz brickworks in the cadastral municipality of Eggendorf (Paudorf), members of the German Air Force (Luftwaffe) and Waffen-SS killed up to 29 recaptured inmates.
- Approximately 19 prisoners released from the justice outlet in Hörfarth (affiliated with the Krems correctional system) were intercepted by the Paudorf Volkssturm. After being returned to Hörfarth, they were summarily executed by Waffen-SS personnel, along with two additional prisoners from Stein.
- Eyewitnesses reported a motorized Waffen-SS patrol encountering and immediately executing prisoners in the vicinity of Statzendorf.
- In Rottersdorf, five prisoners were intercepted by a Waffen-SS squad and shot by the roadside.
- East of Krems, prisoners were apprehended either individually or in small groups by the Volkssturm or local police in locations such as Hadersdorf am Kamp, Engabrunn, and Theiß (in the municipality of Gedersdorf). They were subsequently interned in Hadersdorf. On 7 April, 61 of these detainees were handed over to a Waffen-SS unit at the directive of the NSDAP district administration in Krems, with the cooperation of local Nazi officials. The prisoners were forced to dig a mass grave outside the Hadersdorf cemetery, where they were subjected to verbal and physical abuse before being executed by machine gun fire.

The terminology Kremser Hasenjagd ('Krems hare hunt') has an unclear origin and is not contemporaneously documented. While Mühlviertler Hasenjagd ('Mühlviertel hare hunt') appeared in media reports as early as spring 1946, the euphemism does not appear to have been associated with the events in Krems before 1953. Moreover, the term is considered insufficient to reflect the systematic and targeted nature of the killings. Contemporary scholarship now refers to these actions more accurately as the ‘Krems prisoner murders’.

== Acts of humanity, civil courage, and spared inmates ==
Despite the prevailing atmosphere of violence and repression during the events surrounding the Krems prisoner murders, a number of individuals (ranging from local families, judicial officials, and Wehrmacht personnel) demonstrated civil courage by using the limited scope of their authority or personal initiative to protect and aid prisoners:

- Judicial officer Johann Urbanek, serving as a floor warden at Stein Prison, provided decisive protection to inmates who sought refuge on his floor once the violence began. He secured them in their cells, thereby shielding them from the massacre. When confronted by SS personnel and fellow staff who demanded access to the prisoners, Urbanek asserted that he retained command over the floor. As a result of his actions, 573 men survived in his section—more than double the official capacity of 268 inmates under his supervision.
- In the village of Hörfarth, a local family gave shelter to two escaped prisoners, effectively saving their lives.
- In Mautern an der Donau, an auxiliary prison warden affiliated with Stein Prison concealed a prisoner in a barn, thereby protecting him from imminent capture and execution.
- Another auxiliary warden from the village of Theiß intervened on behalf of four prisoners detained in Hadersdorf. By presenting their release documents, he successfully argued for their exemption from execution and enabled them to proceed in the direction of Vienna.
- Near the village of Ambach, a prisoner captured by members of the Wehrmacht was spared execution. The soldiers instead chose to return him to the prison, contrary to the practice of summary killings at the time.
- In Palt, a member of the Volkssturm was assigned to guard a captured prisoner. After a period of time, he looked at his watch and released the detainee, stating that his shift had ended.
- Three Greek prisoners managed to reach Wagram ob der Traisen, where they were hidden in a farmer's cellar. They remained in hiding until the arrival of Red Army troops a few days later, who liberated them.

== Victims ==
According to research published in 2024, the number of confirmed victims of the Krems prisoner murders includes at least 377 inmates from Stein Prison and 20 from the Krems facility, in addition to five judicial officers and three civilians. The fate of approximately 100 inmates from Stein Prison remains unaccounted for. Consequently, the total number of victims may have reached or exceeded 500 individuals.

On 9 April 1945, several days after the massacre, 44 prisoners who had been sentenced to death by the Vienna District Court were transferred to the now largely depopulated Stein Prison. Among those transported were members of the Polish anti-fascist resistance organization Stragan, along with other convicts, including several Catholic priests affiliated with an Austrian resistance movement. These individuals had been awaiting the outcome of clemency appeals. Nevertheless, on 15 April 1945, all 44 men were executed—presumably by Gestapo operatives from Vienna—without their petitions for clemency ever being processed.

== Legal proceedings ==
In the autumn of 1945, judicial investigations into the atrocities committed at Stein Prison were initiated by the Austrian authorities. A total of twelve principal perpetrators among the prison staff, along with the commander of the Volkssturm in Krems and two additional Volkssturm members, were brought before the People's Court Vienna to face charges related to their involvement in the crimes.

Key figures of the Nazi regime, such as Krems District Leader Anton Wilthum and Gauleiter Hugo Jury, evaded legal accountability by committing suicide. First Lieutenant Lorenz Sonderer, one of the principal instigators, returned to his native Bavaria and remained beyond the reach of Austrian justice.

The proceedings—known as the Stein Trial—concluded on 30 August 1946. Of the defendants, five individuals (Leo Pilz, Alois Baumgartner, Anton Pomassl, Franz Heinisch, and Eduard Ambrosch) were sentenced to death. Five others received life imprisonment, one was sentenced to a term of three years, and four were acquitted.

A separate case before the People's Court addressed the mass execution of prisoners in Hadersdorf am Kamp. In the context of these proceedings, a court-ordered exhumation of the victims took place in April 1946. The local NSDAP leader (Ortsgruppenleiter), his deputy (Organisationsleiter), and a representative of the Krems district NSDAP administration were sentenced to lengthy prison terms.

Notably, no members of the Waffen-SS involved in the massacre were ever identified or prosecuted in post-war trials. With one known exception, Wehrmacht personnel implicated in the events similarly escaped legal consequences. In total, the Austrian judiciary investigated at least 43 individuals in connection with the events surrounding the final phase of the war at Stein.

The incomplete recovery and identification of victims suggest that additional mass graves related to the Krems prisoner murders may exist in the vicinity of Krems, though claims of such graves in Gneixendorf, Rohrendorf and Theiß remain unconfirmed due to the lack of concrete evidence.

== Remembrance ==
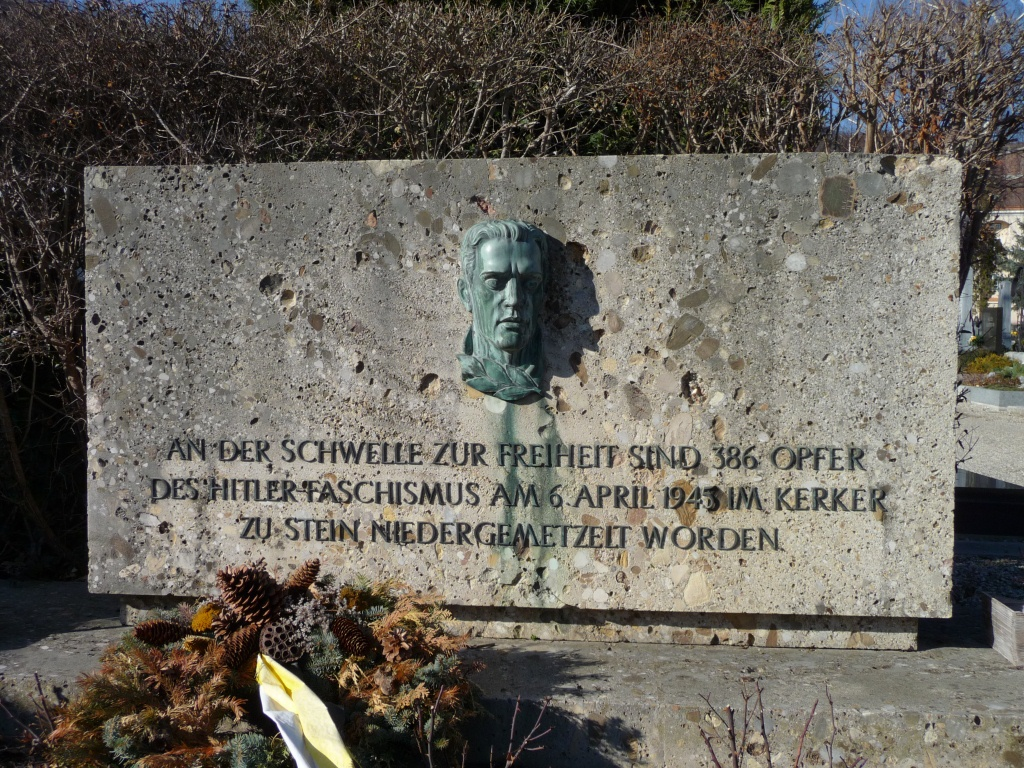
Monument at the Stein cemetery

In the immediate post-war period and in the decades that followed, various initiatives sought to commemorate the victims of the Stein massacre:

- In 1946, a memorial for the Greek victims of the massacre was unveiled directly opposite the main entrance of the penal institution, which was subsequently renamed ‘Justizanstalt Stein’ after the Second World War.
- A memorial at the Krems-Stein cemetery, designed by Hans Kröll in 1951, honors the murdered prisoners.
- In 1995, a commemorative project initiated by Robert Streibel and Gerald Buchas gained public attention by erecting 386 white-painted wooden crosses along the roads surrounding the prison facility.
- That same year, a local resident constructed a wayside shrine in the Panholz area—located on the boundary between Furth bei Göttweig and Paudorf—marking the site of a former mass grave associated with the so-called ‘Krems hare hunt’.
- In 2006, efforts by a private association to establish a central memorial in Hadersdorf led to political controversy. Eventually, the municipality installed a memorial plaque at the local cemetery. Additional privately installed plaques listed the names of those executed.
- On 12 April 2015, a memorial stone was unveiled at the Krems-Stein cemetery by the Ambassador of the Republic of Poland and the Mayor of Krems, in honor of the Polish resistance fighters executed on 15 April 1945. Notably, the inscription omitted both the names of the victims and references to prisoners of other nationalities who were killed alongside them.
- In the same year, a path near the main entrance of Stein Prison was named Gerasimos-Garnelis-Weg, in memory of a Greek survivor of the massacre.
- An artistic engagement with the history of the massacre was undertaken in 2018 by Ramesch Daha, a Vienna-based artist originally from Iran. Under the title ‘06.04.1945’, Daha painted enlarged fragments of the prison register from the years 1944 and 1945 onto the outer wall of the prison.
- During a memorial ceremony on 26 March 2023 at Krems-Stein, the names of those murdered during the Krems prisoner murders were read aloud in public for the first time.

== See also ==
- KZ Sonnenburg (Sonnenburg Prison massacre, 30–31 January 1945)
- Mühlviertler Hasenjagd or Mühlviertler Menschenhatz (Escape and persecution of Soviet prisoners who had fled from the Mauthausen concentration camp, February 1945)
- Celler Hasenjagd (Massacre of concentration camp prisoners, Celle, 8–10 April 1945)

== Literary reception ==
- Robert Streibel: April in Stein. (Novel), Sankt Pölten, 2015, ISBN 978-3-7017-1649-4.

== Sources ==
- Gerhard Jagschitz (Ed.): Stein, 6. April 1945. Das Urteil des Volksgerichts Wien (August 1946) gegen die Verantwortlichen des Massakers im Zuchthaus Stein. Bundesministerium für Justiz, Dokumentationsarchiv des österreichischen Widerstands, Wien, 1995.
- Konstantin Ferihumer: Der Stein-Komplex. Zur Aufarbeitung von Kriegsendphaseverbrechen des Zweiten Weltkriegs im Raum Stein a. d. Donau. Master thesis Vienna University, 2012.
- Konstantin Ferihumer: Der Fall Sonderer. Eine vergangenheitspolitische Kurzbiografie, in Festschrift Winfried R. Garscha, Vienna, 2017.
- Udo Eduard Fischer: Erinnerungen 1914–1947. Beiträge zur Geschichte der Pfarre Paudorf-Göttweig. Paudorf, 1995.
- Katharina Moser, Alexander Horacek: Zur Erschießung von 61 Menschen in Hadersdorf am Kamp am 7. April 1945. Seminar paper for the research seminar in Austrian history, University of Vienna, 1994/95.
- Wilhelm Baum: Naziopfer der katholischen Kirche – Die antifaschistische Freiheitsbewegung Österreichs, in: Das Buch der Namen. Die Opfer des Nationalsozialismus in Kärnten. Kitab, Klagenfurt, 2010, ISBN 978-3-902585-53-0, p. 300–312.
- Wilhelm Baum: Anton Granig, in: Biographisch-Bibliographisches Kirchenlexikon BBKL, Vol. 32, Bautz, Nordhausen, 2011, ISBN 978-3-88309-615-5, p. 536–543.
- Karl Reder: Tod an der Schwelle zur Freiheit. Das Zuchthaus Stein an der Donau während der Zeit des Nationalsozialismus und die Ermordung von Häftlingen im April 1945, Graz, 2024, ISBN 978-3-903425-20-0.
