= Jamno, Sulęcin County =

Jamno
- Village
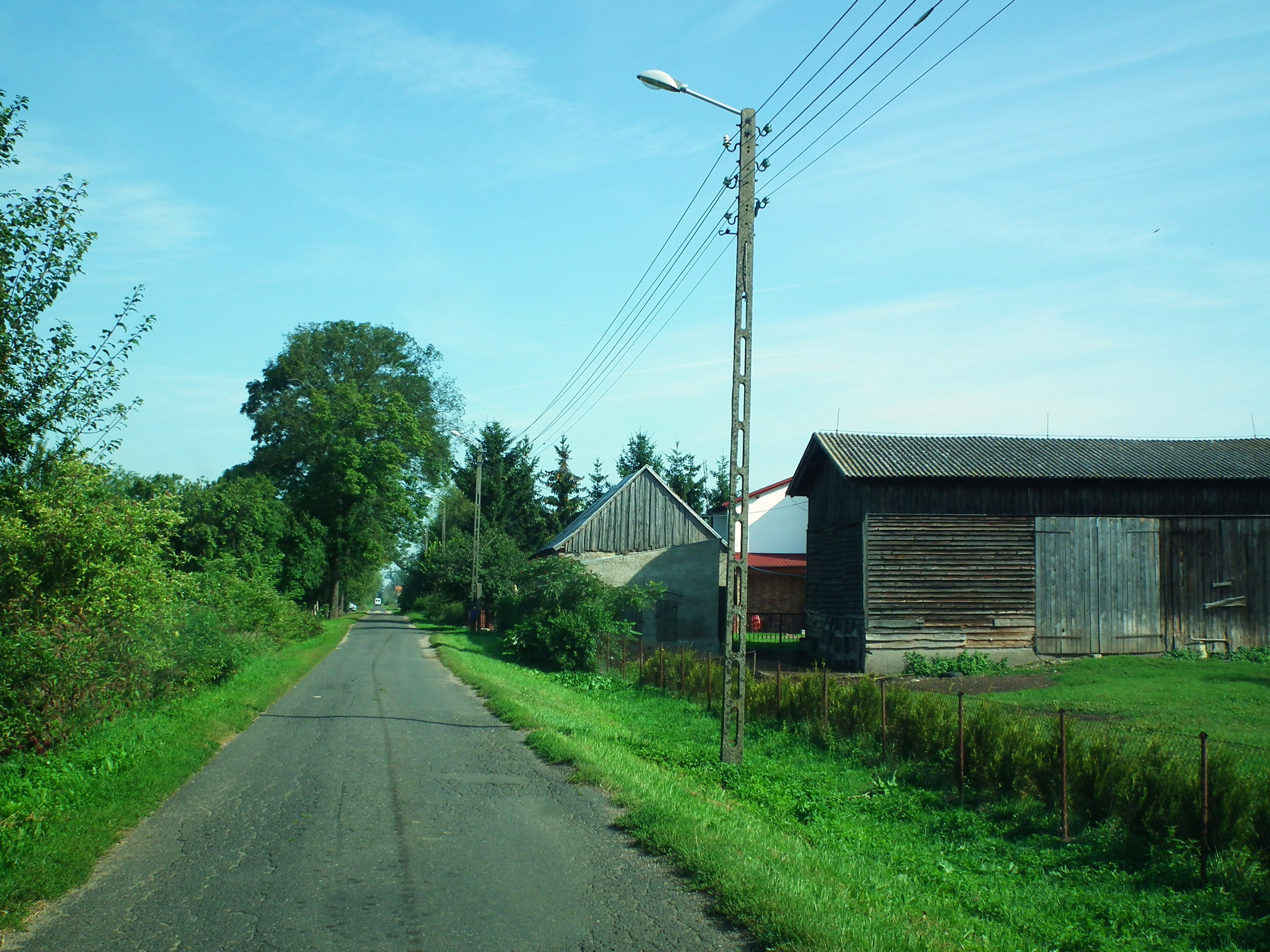
- Street of Jamno, Sulęcin County

- Location within Poland
- Coordinates: 52°35′53″N 14°52′37″E
- Country: Poland
- Voivodeship: Lubusz
- County: Sulęcin
- Gmina: Słońsk

Jamno [ˈjamnɔ] is a village in the administrative district of Gmina Słońsk, within Sulęcin County, Lubusz Voivodeship, in western Poland.
