= Sonnenburg concentration camp =

Nazi German concentration camp in Sonnenburg, Poland

- Concentration camp
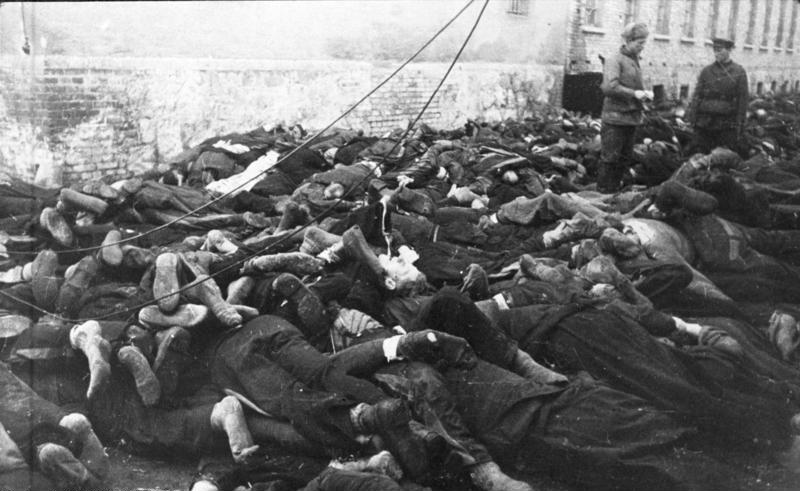
- Murdered prisoners of Sonnenburg concentration camp, 1945, with Soviet soldiers

- Location of the former Sonnenburg concentration camp in Poland
- Coordinates: 52°33′51″N 14°48′41″E
- Location: Słońsk, Poland

The Sonnenburg concentration camp (German: Konzentrationslager Sonnenburg) was a Nazi German concentration camp, that was opened on 3 April 1933 in Sonnenburg (now Słońsk in Poland) in a former prison, on the initiative of the Free State of Prussia Ministry of the Interior and Justice. (Note: According to Encyclopedia of Camps and Ghettos published by the United States Holocaust Memorial Museum, the Sonnenburg concentration camp was one of 110 early Nazi German camps known and listed by name.)

== History ==
Although the state of hygiene in the building, which had been closed in 1930, was appalling, officials of the Prussian justice ministry recommended it as a suitable site. They estimated the capacity of the building at 941 so-called protective custody prisoners (Schutzhäftlinge), who could be accommodated either in single cells or in communal cells holding up to 20, 30 and 60 people each. The first 200 prisoners along with 60 SA auxiliary police came on 3 April 1933 from the Berlin Police Presidium. Later, on the order of the head of the Prussian Gestapo, prisoners were deported from the penal institution of Gollnow (Goleniów) in Pomerania to Sonnenburg, bringing the number of inmates to 1,000.

Sonnenburg concentration camp was officially closed on 23 April 1934, although in practice it remained open. Since the beginning of the Second World War in 1939 the concentration camp or punishment camp (Straflager) continued as a concentration and labour camp for alleged anti-German people from the occupied territories until 1945. Prisoners included Poles, Frenchmen, Luxembourgers, Dutchmen, Danes, Norwegians, Belgians, Czechs, Yugoslavs, Slovaks, Bulgarians, Austrians, the Swiss, Estonians, Russians and Spaniards. Amongst its inmates were the resistance fighters, Jean-Baptiste Lebas and Bjørn Egge. The French spy, René Lefebvre, father of Archbishop Marcel Lefebvre, succumbed in 1944 to the consequences of imprisonment there.

On the night of 30–31 January 1945 with the Red Army approaching, the Gestapo killed over 800 prisoners by lining them up against a wall and shooting them. Soviet soldiers entered the camp on 2 February to find 819 bodies still lying in the courtyard (see picture above right). A few prisoners survived the massacre.

== German staff ==
The first commandant was police lieutenant (Polizeioberleutnant) Keßler. After him came:

- Police second lieutenant (Polizeileutnant) Bark
- Police lieutenant Siegmund
- SA-Sturmführer Jahr

SA-Sturmführer Bahr initially commanded the infamous Berlin SA storm troops (Stürme) No. 1 Horst Wessel and No. 33 Mordsturm Maikowski, which were responsible for guarding prisoners. They were reinforced by members of the police. In late April, the Berlin SA men were replaced by others from Frankfurt/Oder. At the end of August the SS took over, as they did in many camps, with 150 men from the 27th SS Regiment (SS-Standarte 27) from Frankfurt/Oder.

== Notable prisoners ==
During the early years of their rule, and long before the start of the war, the Nazi regime mainly imprisoned Communists and Social Democrats in Sonnenburg. These included:

- Gerhard Kratzat, German resistance fighter
- Jean-Baptiste Lebas, French minister and deputy to the National Assembly, World War I and II resistance activist
- Hans Litten, German lawyer
- Erich Mühsam, German-Jewish antimilitarist anarchist writer
- Carl von Ossietzky, German pacifist
- René Lefebvre, French resistance fighter and monarchist
- Eugène Greau, French professional cyclist
- Wilhelm Rescher, mayor of Potsdam (1957–1961)

== Commemoration ==
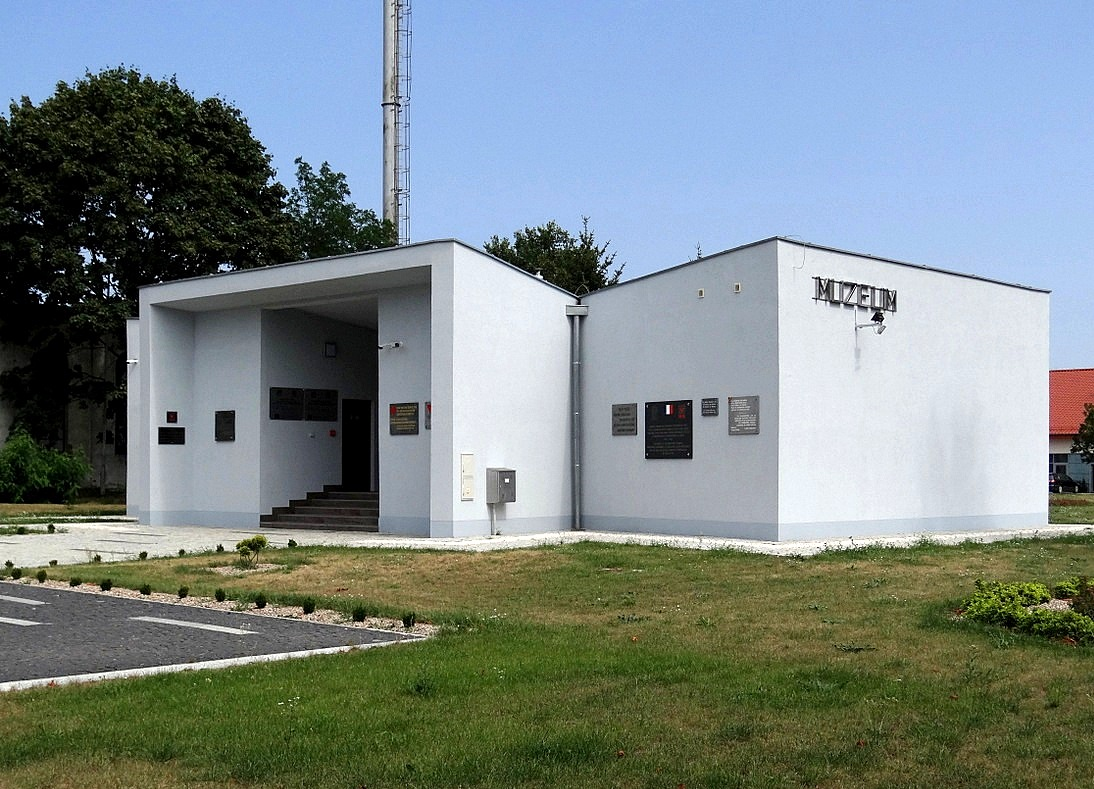
Martyrdom Museum

The Martyrdom Museum is located at the former camp with a memorial to the victims.

== Other early concentration camps ==
- Breitenau concentration camp (1933–1934)
- Breslau-Dürrgoy concentration camp in Wrocław, Poland
- Esterwegen concentration camp
- Kemna concentration camp
- Oranienburg concentration camp
- Vulkanwerft concentration camp in the Bredow district of Stettin

== See also ==
- Stein Prison massacre
- Glossary of Nazi Germany
- The Holocaust
- List of books about Nazi Germany
- List of concentration and internment camps
- List of Nazi-German concentration camps
- Nazi concentration camps
- Nazi Party
- Nazi songs
- World War II
