= Gorzyczki, Greater Poland Voivodeship =

Gorzyczki
- Village
- Location within Poland
- Coordinates: 52°7′N 16°49′E
- Country: Poland
- Voivodeship: Greater Poland
- County: Kościan
- Gmina: Czempiń

Gorzyczki is a village in the administrative district of Gmina Czempiń, within Kościan County, Greater Poland Voivodeship, in west-central Poland.
