= Głuchowo, Kościan County =

Głuchowo
- Village
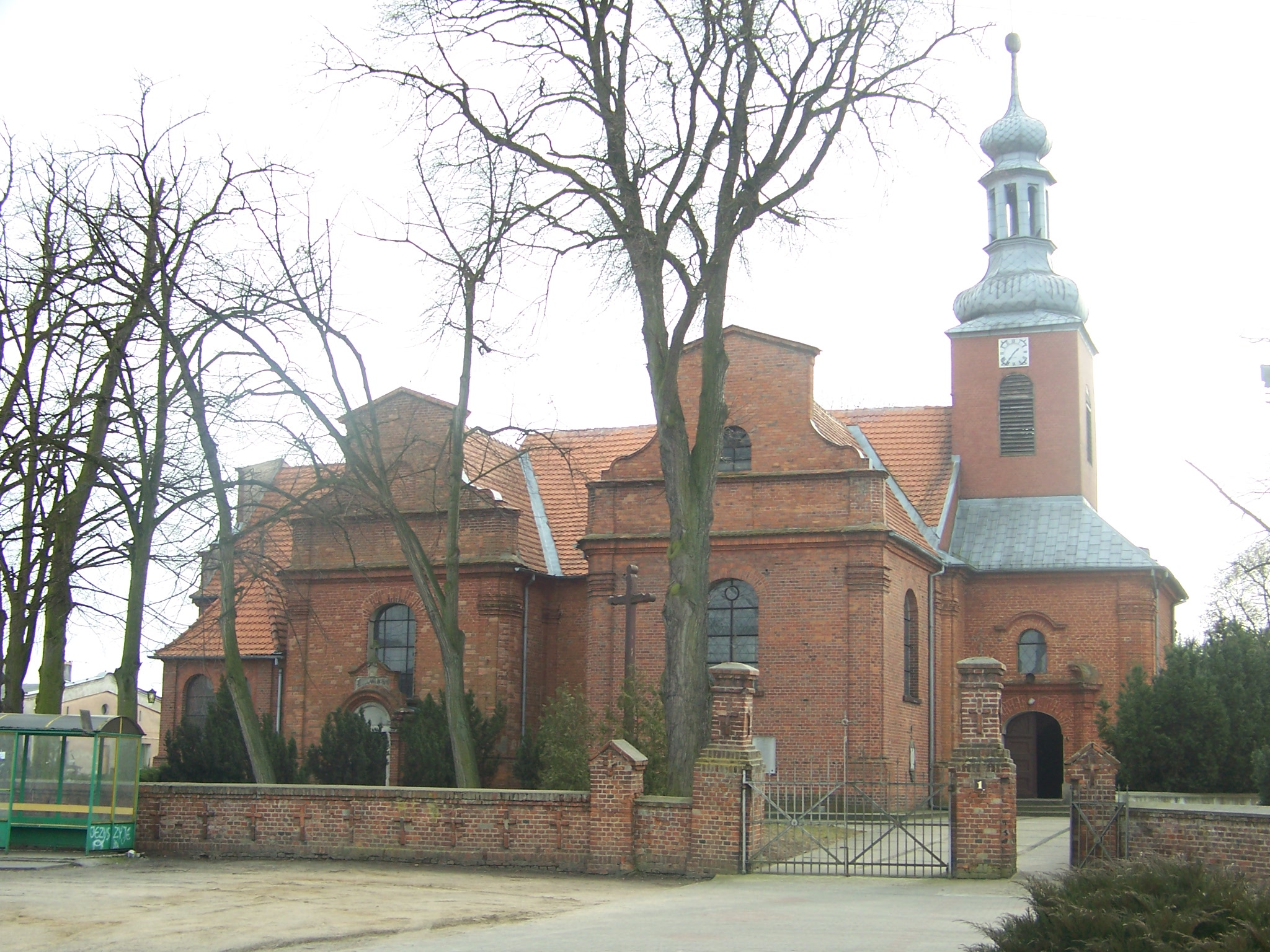
- Church in Gluchowo

- Location within Poland
- Coordinates: 52°10′39″N 16°42′38″E
- Country: Poland
- Voivodeship: Greater Poland
- County: Kościan
- Gmina: Czempiń

Głuchowo [ɡwuˈxɔvɔ] is a village in the administrative district of Gmina Czempiń, within Kościan County, Greater Poland Voivodeship, in west-central Poland.
