= Czempiń =

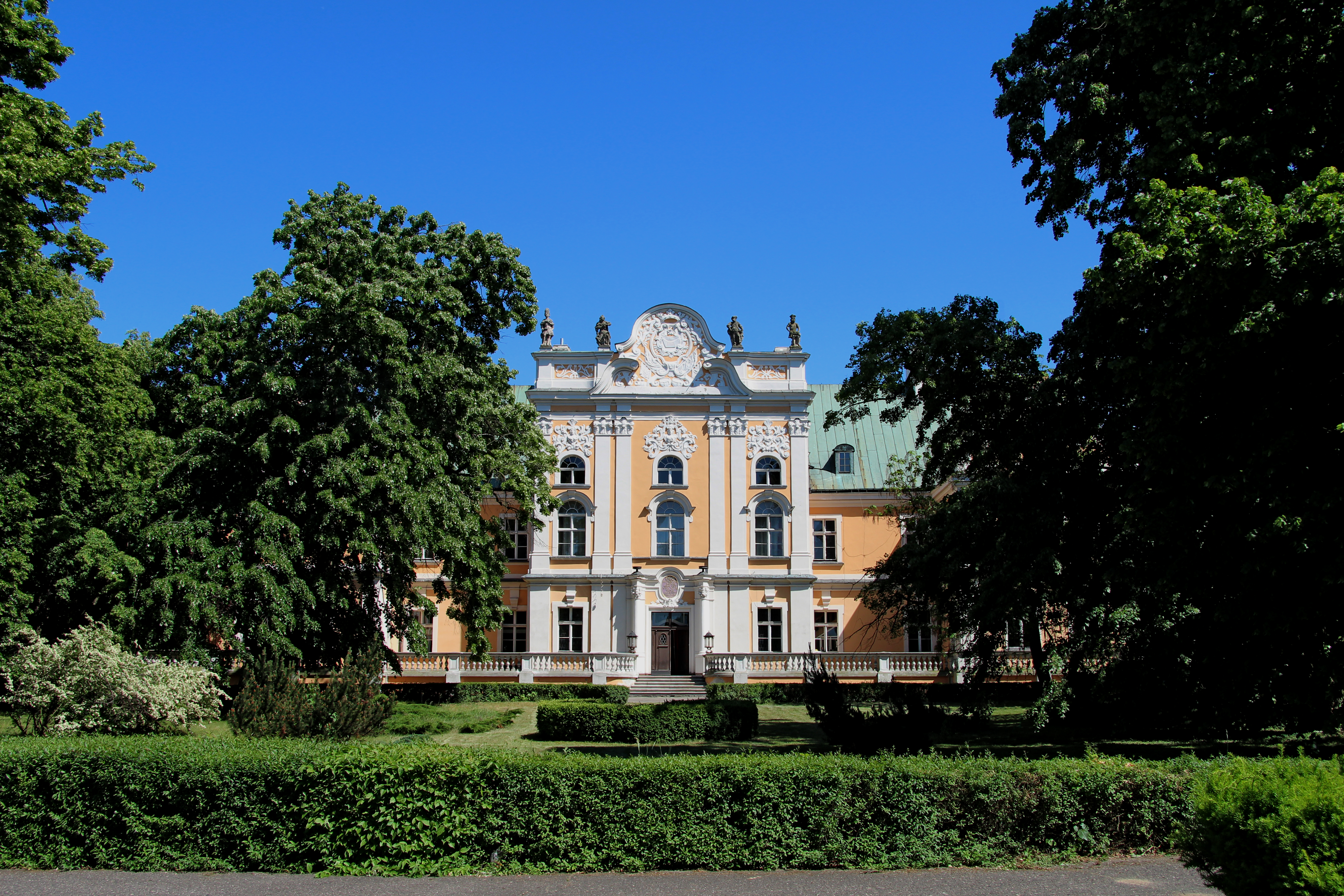
- Ludwik Szołdrski Palace

- Flag Coat of arms

- Location within Poland
- Coordinates: 52°9′42″N 16°46′38″E
- Country: Poland
- Voivodeship: Greater Poland
- County: Kościan
- Gmina: Czempiń

Government
  - Mayor: Konrad Malicki

Area
  - Total: 3.29 km^{2} (1.27 sq mi)

Population (31 December 2021)
  - Total: 4,921
  - Density: 1,500/km^{2} (3,870/sq mi)
- Time zone: UTC+1 (CET)
  - Summer (DST): UTC+2 (CEST)
- Postal code: 64-020
- Area code: +48 61
- Vehicle registration: PKS
- Website: http://www.czempin.pl/

Czempiń [ˈt͡ʂɛmpʲiɲ] is a town in Kościan County, Greater Poland Voivodeship, in western Poland. As of December 2021, the town has a population of 4,921.

== History ==
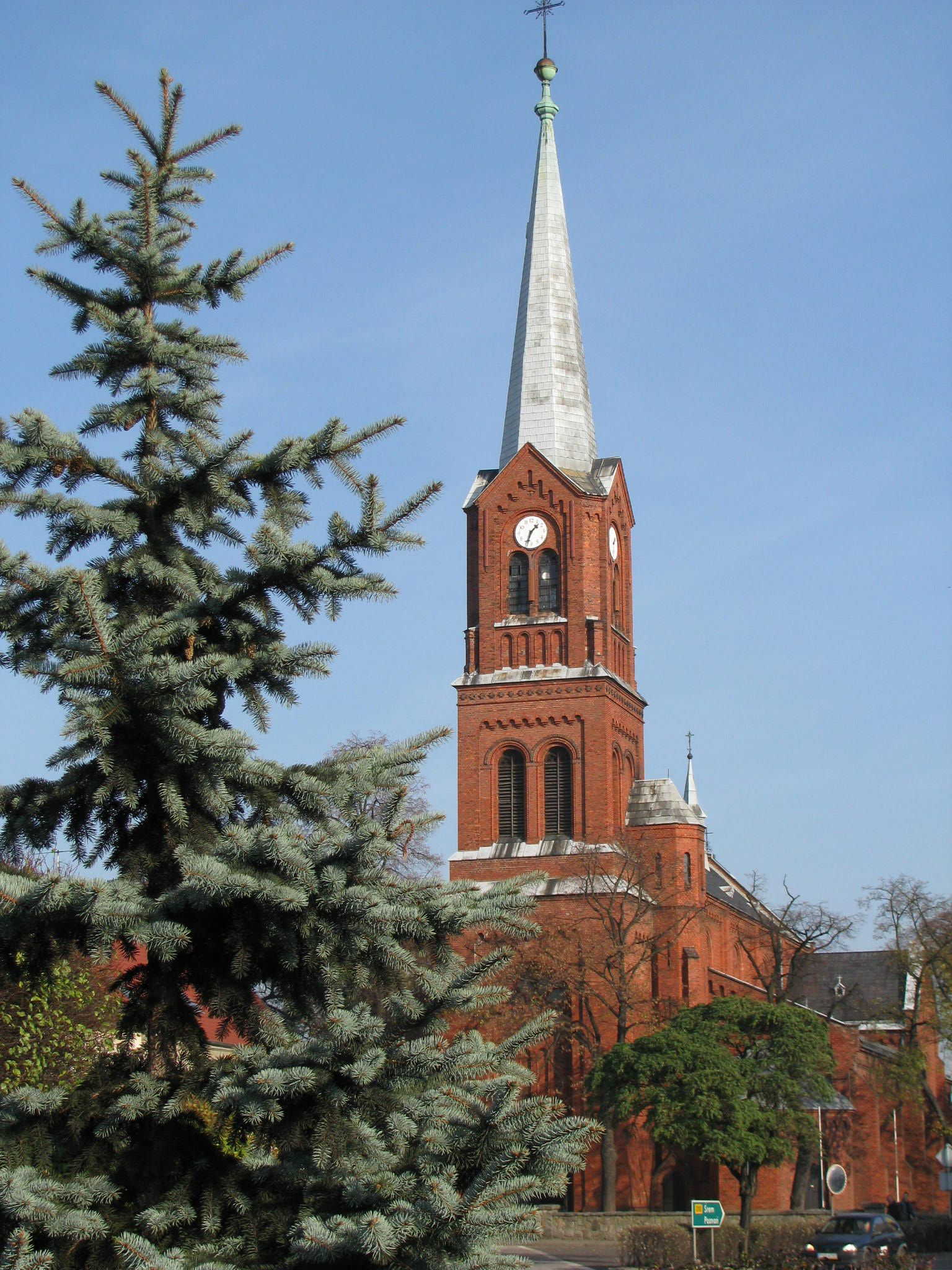
Saint Michael Archangel church

As part of the region of Greater Poland, i.e. the cradle of the Polish state, the area formed part of Poland since its establishment in the 10th century. Czempiń was granted town rights before 1399. It was a private town, administratively located in the Kościan County in the Poznań Voivodeship in the Greater Poland Province. The Szołdrski family erected a Baroque palace in Czempiń.

During the German occupation of Poland (World War II), several prominent Poles from Czempiń were among the victims of massacres of Poles committed by the Germans in nearby Kościan on October 2 and 23, 1939 and in the forest near Kościan on November 7, 1939 (see also: Intelligenzaktion). In 1939, 1941 and 1943, the occupiers carried out expulsions of Poles, whose houses were then handed over to German colonists as part of the Lebensraum policy. Poles expelled in 1939 and 1943 were deported to the General Government in the more eastern part of German-occupied Poland, whereas expellees from 1941 were deported to forced labour in Germany. Some local teachers were among Polish teachers murdered in the Mauthausen concentration camp. In 1940, the Germans renamed the town to Karlshausen in attempt to erase traces of Polish origin.

== Demographics ==
Historical population

Year	Pop.	±%
1871	1,991	—
1880	2,156	+8.3%
1890	2,321	+7.7%
1900	2,170	−6.5%
1910	2,212	+1.9%
1921	2,054	−7.1%

Year	Pop.	±%
1931	2,103	+2.4%
1939	2,406	+14.4%
1950	2,585	+7.4%
1960	3,250	+25.7%
2010	5,183	+59.5%

== Transport ==
The S5 expressway bypasses Czempiń to the west. Exit 39 of the expressway provides quick access to Poznań and to Wrocław.

Voivodeship road 310 passes right through the town.

Czempiń has a station on the Poznań to Wrocław railway line.

== Sports ==
The local football club is Helios Czempiń. It competes in the lower leagues.
