= Głuchowo, Lubusz Voivodeship =

Głuchowo
- Village
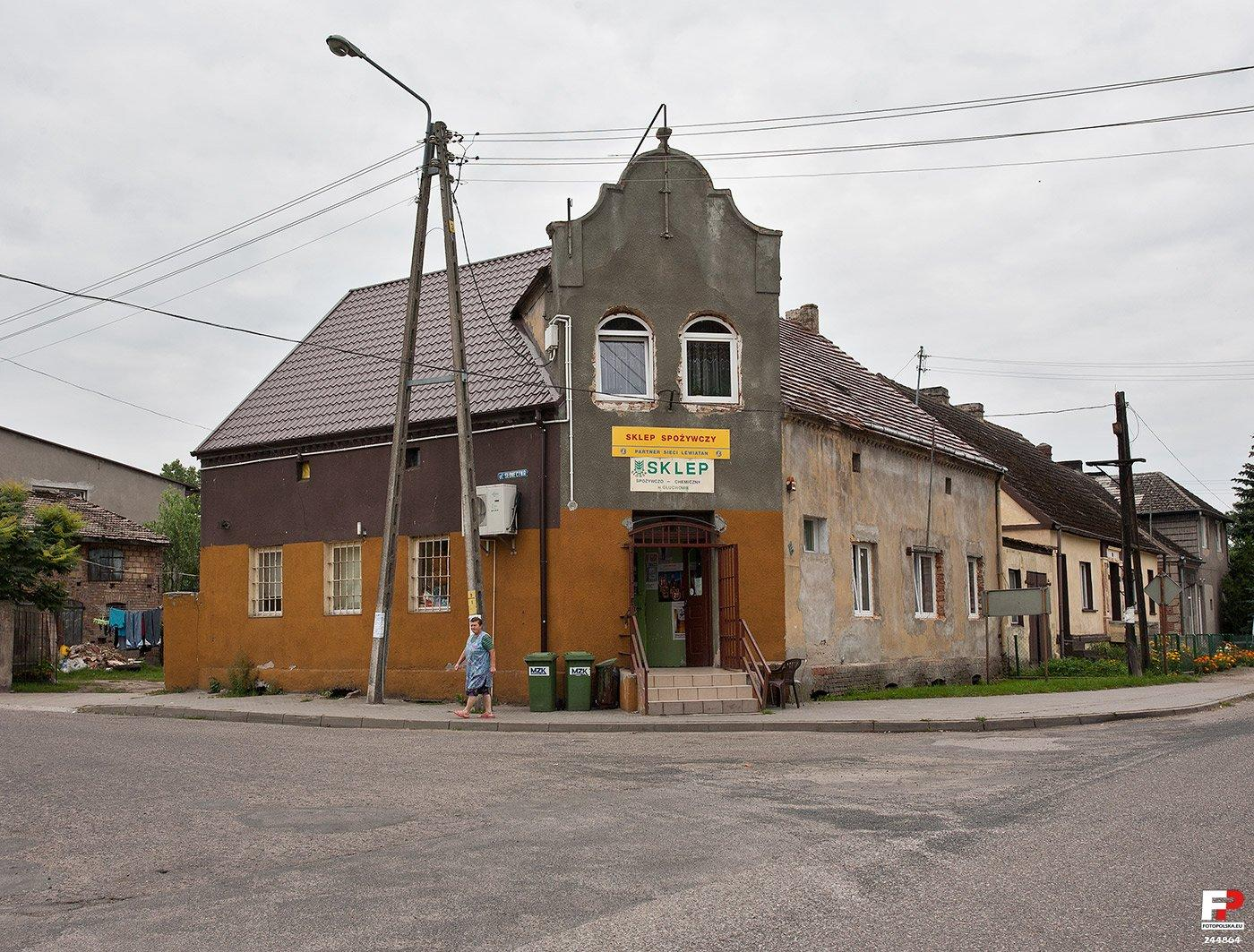

- Location within Poland
- Coordinates: 52°35′57″N 14°54′41″E
- Country: Poland
- Voivodeship: Lubusz
- County: Sulęcin
- Gmina: Słońsk
- Population: 200

Głuchowo [ɡwuˈxɔvɔ] is a village in the administrative district of Gmina Słońsk, within Sulęcin County, Lubusz Voivodeship, in western Poland.
