= Polne, Lubusz Voivodeship =

Polne
- Village
- Location within Poland
- Coordinates: 52°36′43″N 14°54′31″E
- Country: Poland
- Voivodeship: Lubusz
- County: Sulęcin
- Gmina: Słońsk

Polne [ˈpɔlnɛ] is a village in the administrative district of Gmina Słońsk, within Sulęcin County, Lubusz Voivodeship, in western Poland.

== See also ==
Territorial changes of Poland after World War II
