= Coat of arms of the Greater Poland Voivodeship =

Polish coat of arms

- Armiger: Agata Sobczyk, Voivode of the Greater Poland Voivodeship
- Adopted: 31 January 2000
- Shield: Red Heater style escutcheon
- Compartment: White (silver) eagle with its head turned left, and raised wings, that has a yellow (golden) beak, legs, stripes on its wings, and a ring on its tail
- Use: Greater Poland Voivodeship

The coat of arms of the Greater Poland Voivodeship, Poland features a white (silver) eagle with its head turned left, and raised wings, that has a yellow (golden) beak, legs, stripes on its wings, and a ring on its tail. The charge is placed in a red Heater style escutcheon with square top and acute base. It was adopted in 2000.

== Design ==
The coat of arms is a red Heater style escutcheon with square top and acute base. In the middle, there is a white (silver) eagle with its head turned left, and raised wings. It has a yellow (golden) beak, legs, stripes on its wings, and a ring on its tail.

== History ==
The coat of arms of the Poznań Land, and the Poznań Voivodeship, from 14th century until 1793.

The design of the coat of arms had originated as the symbol of the Poznań Land, a land (administrative subdivision) of Poland in the Middle Ages. It depicted a white (silver) eagle with a head turned left, that was placed on the red background. In 14th century, after 1314, the design became the coat of arms of then-established Poznań Voivodeship, that was formed within the borders of the Poznań Land. It was used until 1793, when the voivodeship had ceased to exist following the Second Partition of Poland. The design had also been used on the 1295 seal used by Przemysł II, the duke of the Duchy of Greater Poland from 1279 to 1296, and the king of Poland from 1295 to 1296.

The design of the coat of arms had been used as part of the coat of arms of the Grand Duchy of Posen that existed from 1815 to 1848, and the Province of Posen, from 1848 to 1920.

The design of the coat of arms of the Poznań Voivodeship proposed in 1928.

In 1928, as part of the project to design the coat of arms for the voivodeships of the Second Polish Republic, the design for the coat of arms of the Poznań Voivodeship had been created. Though planned to be officially approved, it never was, as it was decided to postpone the approval of the subdivision symbols due to the planned administrative reform, that eventually took place in 1938. Eventually, the plans for the establishment of the coat of arms had been stopped by the Invasion of Poland by Nazi Germany, on 1 September 1939, that begun the World War II, and were not picked up back after the end of the conflict. The proposed design featured a white eagle with its head turned left, and with yellow (golden) beak, legs, and a ring on its tail. It was placed Iberian style escutcheon with square top and rounded base.

The currently-used coat of arms of the Greater Poland Voivodeship had been adopted on 31 January 2000 by the Greater Poland Voivodeship Sejmik. It had been based on the design present on the 1295 seal used by Przemysł II, the duke of the Duchy of Greater Poland from 1279 to 1296, and the king of Poland from 1295 to 1296. The coat of arms is additionally present on the flag of the voivodeship.

== See also ==
- flag of the Greater Poland Voivodeship
