= Michał Zieliński (politician) =

Polish politician (born 1972)

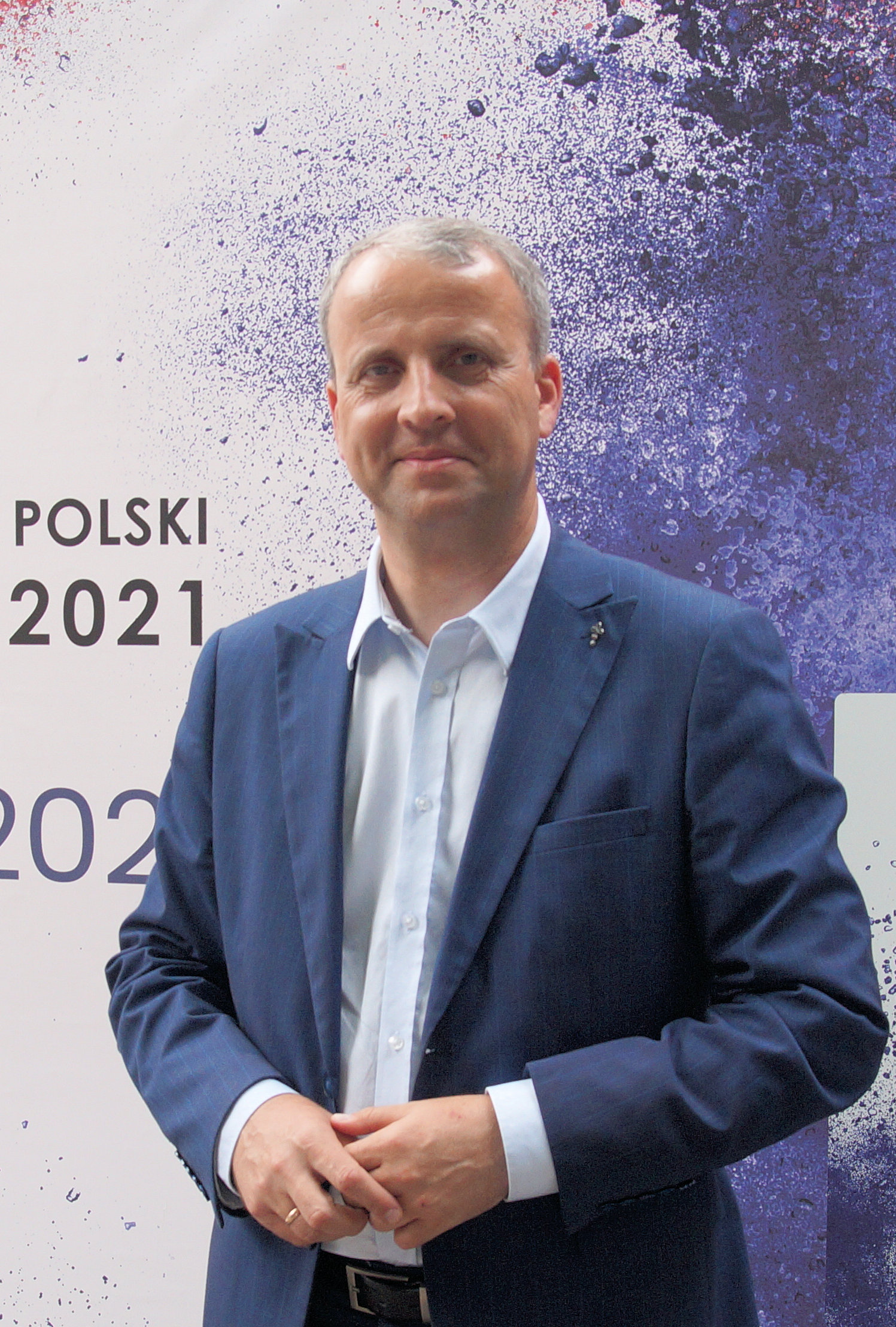

Voivode of Greater Poland Voivodeship
- In office January 2021 – December 2023
- Preceded by: Łukasz Mikołajczyk
- Succeeded by: Agata Sobczyk

Personal details
- Born: 16 July 1972 (age 54) Szamotuły, Poland
- Citizenship: Poland
- Party: Law and Justice
- Education: Poznań University of Economics and Business
- Awards: Badge of Honour "For Merit to Agriculture"

Michał Witold Zieliński (born July 16, 1972 in Szamotuły) is a Polish politician and civil servant who served as the Voivode of Greater Poland Voivodeship from 2021 to 2023.

== Biography ==
He was born in Szamotuły. His parents were physical education teachers, and his father was the principal of the High School in Szamotuły. In his youth, he competed in sprints and relay races, the long jump, and the triple jump (winning the Polish Junior Championship in this discipline). He lives in Oborniki. He is an economist by profession, graduating from the Faculty of Management at the Poznań University of Economics. He has worked in the private sector (including as a sales and marketing director) and has also run a business. From 2017 to 2018, he served as deputy director of the Poznań branch of the National Support Center for Agriculture. He held the positions of deputy director (2016) and director (2018) of the Greater Poland branch of the Agency for Restructuring and Modernization of Agriculture. He also managed the Obornickie Athletics Club, of which he was a founder.

He was active in the Obornickie Civic Local Government Committee. In the 1998 local elections, he unsuccessfully ran for a councilor seat in the Greater Poland Voivodeship Sejmik on the Solidarity Electoral Action ticket. He later joined the Law and Justice party, becoming the party's chairman in the Obornickie district and deputy chairman in the Piła district. He ran for mayor of Oborniki in 2010 and 2014 (finishing third place twice). During these years, he also ran for the Oborniki City Council. He also ran unsuccessfully for the regional assembly in 2002 and 2018 and in the parliamentary elections in 2019 and 2023.

In January 2021, he was appointed Voivode of Greater Poland Voivodeship. He retired from this position in December 2023. In 2024, he was elected a councilor of the 7th term of the Greater Poland Voivodeship Sejmik.
