= List of non-rectangular flags =

This is a list of non-rectangular flags, including the official flags of states or territories, groups or movements, and individual people. This excludes square flags, such as those of Switzerland, or Vatican City.

== Current flags ==
=== Country flags ===
Name	Image	Notes	References
Flag of Nepal			

=== Other sovereign state flags ===
Name	Image	Notes	References
Danish State and War Flag and State Ensign			
Danish Naval Ensign			
Estonian Naval Ensign			
Finnish War Flag and Naval Ensign			
German Naval Ensign			
Icelandic State and War Flag			
Moroccan Naval Jack			
Norwegian State and War Flag			
Swedish War Flag and Naval Ensign			

=== Government flags ===
Flag	Image	Country
Minister of Defense of Brazil		Brazil

=== Sub-national territories ===
Flag	Image	Country
Alameda		United States (California)
Aracena		Spain (Province of Huelva, Andalusia)
Banská Bystrica		Slovakia (Banská Bystrica Region)
Bartoszyce County		Poland (Warmian-Masurian Voivodeship)
Bratislava		Slovakia (Bratislava Region)
Chillicothe		United States (Ohio)
Chodzież County		Poland (Greater Poland Voivodeship)
Érd		Hungary (Pest County)
Euclid		United States (Ohio)
Greater Poland Voivodeship		Poland
Grodzisk County		Poland (Greater Poland Voivodeship)
Irkutsk		Russia (Irkutsk Oblast)
Janów County		Poland (Lublin Voivodeship)
Jarocin County		Poland (Greater Poland Voivodeship)
Kent		United States (Ohio)
Kępno County		Poland (Greater Poland Voivodeship)
Košice Old Town		Slovakia (Košice, Košice Region)
Leśna		Poland (Lower Silesian Voivodeship)
Lublin County		Poland (Lublin Voivodeship)
Łuków County		Poland (Lublin Voivodeship)
Marysville		United States (Ohio)
Międzychód County		Poland (Greater Poland Voivodeship)
Nantucket		United States (Massachusetts)
Nitra		Slovakia
North Savo		Finland
Oborniki County		Poland (Greater Poland Voivodeship)
Ohio		United States
Övörkhangai Province		Mongolia
Piła County		Poland (Greater Poland Voivodeship)
Pleszew County		Poland (Greater Poland Voivodeship)
Portsmouth		United States (Ohio)
Poznań County		Poland (Greater Poland Voivodeship)
Radzyń County		Poland (Lublin Voivodeship)
Ruhnu Parish		Estonia (Saare County)
Ryki County		Poland (Lublin Voivodeship)
Słupca County		Poland (Greater Poland Voivodeship)
Selenge Province		Mongolia
Satakunta		Finland
Sükhbaatar Province		Mongolia
Suwałki County		Poland (Podlaskie Voivodeship)
Tampa		United States (Florida)
Veneto		Italy
Venice		Italy (Veneto)
Washington County		United States (Ohio)
Warmian–Masurian Voivodeship		Poland
Włocławek		Poland (Kuyavian-Pomeranian Voivodeship)
Zamora		Spain (Province of Zamora, Castile and León)
Zlaté Moravce		Slovakia (Nitra Region)
Trnava		Slovakia
Trenčín		Slovakia
Jutland (unofficial)		Denmark
Lower Saxony (state ensign)		Germany
Gmina Słupia		Poland (Skierniewice County, Łódź Voivodeship)
Havana		Cuba (La Habana Province)

=== Private entities ===
Name	Image	Date	Notes	References
Holy Empire of Reunion		1997–present	A micronation based in Réunion.	

== Former flags ==
Name	Image	Date	Notes	References
Ajaigarh State				
Ajuran Sultanate				
Allied-Occupied Germany		1946–1949	Merchant flag	
Allied-Occupied Japan		1945–1952		
Bengal Sultanate (Hussain Shahi Dynasty)		1492–1538	Dynastial flag	
Anuradhapura Kingdom			De facto flag.	
Australia (unofficial)			Bowman flag	
Benares State				
Bogd Khanate of Mongolia		1911–1920 1921–1924		
Emirate of Bukhara				
Cambodia		Pre-1864		
Catholic League		1576–1577 1584–1595	One of several variants used.	Procession de la Ligue 1590 Carnavalet
Caucasian Imamate				
Republic of Cospaia				
Republic of China (Wang Jingwei regime)		1940–1943	Flag of China	
Chitral state				
Cossack Hetmanate				
Dewas State				
Dir state				
Emirate of Granada				
Ethiopia		1881–1889		
Holstein				
War flag of the Holy Roman Empire		12th–early 14th centuries		
Hungary		895–1000		
Idrisid Emirate of Asir		1909–1927		
India		1917	Indian Home Rule movement	
Jaipur State		1699–1818		
Jammu and Kashmir State		1836–1936		
Jallon		pre-1896		
Jallon		1896–1912		
Kalisz		2004–2018		
Kalmyk Khanate				
Kanem–Bornu Empire				
Khilchipur State				
Kingdom of Kakheti		1465–1762		
Maratha Confederacy			Bhagwa Dhwaj	
Mamluk Sultanate				
Mongolian People's Republic		1924–1930		
Mongolian People's Republic		1930–1940		
Mudhol State				
Nepal		c. 1846–1856	Since its establishment in 1768, Nepal has changed its flag multiple times, each time to a non-rectangular flag.	
Nepal		1856–c. 1930	Since its establishment in 1768, Nepal has changed its flag multiple times, each time to a non-rectangular flag.	
Nepal		c. 1930–1962	Since its establishment in 1768, Nepal has changed its flag multiple times, each time to a non-rectangular flag.	
North Sea Empire		1013–1042		
Oudh State		1572–1856		
Royal Flag of Norway		1844–1905		
Postal Flag of Norway		1899		
Novgorod Republic		1385		
Ottoman Tunisia				
Republic of Rose Island		1968–1969	A micronation	
Porbandar State				
Empire of Trebizond				
Banner of Ivan the Terrible in the Siege of Kazan				
Qing dynasty		1862–1889		
Qing dynasty		1862–1912	Imperial flag	
Rana dynasty		c. 19th–20th centuries		
Republic of Venice			Banner of Saint Mark	
Merchant flag of the Ryukyu Kingdom		1429–1879		
Ahmadnagar Sultanate				
Gwalior State		1731–1818		
Indore State				
Jhansi State				
Kolhapur State				
Kingdom of Nagpur				
Sangli State				
Crimean Khanate				
Delhi Sultanate				
West Macedonia				
Byzantine Empire				
Byzantine Imperial Ensign (according to Pietro Vesconte's portolan chart.)				
Examples of Byzantine military banners probably borne by cavalry, according to the Chronicle of Ioannis Skylitzes.				
Sultanate of Cirebon				
Sultanate of Ternate		16th to 17th century		
Republic of Siena		13th century		
Princedom of Shapsugia				
Crown of Aragon		1413–1516		
Kingdom of Hungary		1102–1163		
Bosnian Banate		1154–1277		
Kingdom of Bosnia		1377–1463		
Province of Carnaro		1924–1947		
Duchy of Urbino				
Military flag of the warriors loyal to Japanese court.			In reality, it was hoisted vertically.	
Venice war flag				
White Star Line		1845–1934	The White Star Line was a British shipping company; this was its house flag.	
Oriflamme			Ancient French war flag.	
Kingdom of Galicia–Volhynia		1199–1349		
Italian Regency of Carnaro		1919–1920		
