= Flag of Greater Poland Voivodeship =

Flag of the Greater Poland Voivodeship, Poland

Greater Poland Voivodeship
- Use: Greater Poland Voivodeship
- Adopted: 31 January 2000
- Design: Trapezoid divided into red stripe on the right, and white stripe on the left, with a white eagle with yellow (golden) beak, legs, stripes on its wings, and a ring on its tail, featured in the middle of the red stripe

The flag of the Greater Poland Voivodeship, Poland is a trapezoid divided into red stripe on the right, and white stripe on the left, with a white eagle with yellow (golden) beak, legs, stripes on its wings, and a ring on its tail, featured in the middle of the red stripe. It was adopted in 2000.

== Design ==
The flag of the Greater Poland Voivodeship has the shape of the trapezoid, of which, the aspect ratio of height to width, of the right and top sides, equals 5:11. The flag is divided vertically onto two stripes, red on the left, and white on the right. The left red side, is a square while the right white side is a trapezoid, of which the aspect ration of the height to width, of the right and top sides, equals 5:11, and which top side is twice as big, as the bottom side.

In the middle of the left red stripe is placed the charge from the coat of arms of the voivodeship. It is a white (silver) eagle with yellow (golden) beak, legs, stripes on its wings, and a ring on its tail. The eagle had been based on the design present on the 1295 seal used by Przemysł II, the duke of the Duchy of Greater Poland from 1279 to 1296, and the king of Poland from 1295 to 1296.

== History ==
The banner used by the Poznań Voivodeship during the Battle of Grunwald in 1410.

In 1410, during the Battle of Grunwald, the Poznań Voivodeship, that existed within the current borders of the Greater Poland Voivodeship, used a red banner with the white eagle with a head turned left, that was placed on it.

The flag of the Grand Duchy of Posen (1815–1848)

The flag of the Province of Posen used from 1886 to 1920.

The flag of Posen-West Prussia used from 1923 to 1935.

The Grand Duchy of Posen was established in 1815, within the modern borders of the Greater Poland Voivodeship. Its flag was divided horizontally into two stripes: red on the top, and white on the bottom (similar to the Indonesian flag). Its aspect ratio of height to width was equal 2:3. In 1848, the state had been replaced by the Province of Posen. On 9 November 1886, the province established the flag that was divided horizontally into three stripes, that were, from top to bottom: white, black, and white. Its aspect ratio of height to width was equal 2:3. The flag had been used until 1920, when the province ceased to exist. In 1922, form the part of its territory, had been established the Frontier March of Posen-West Prussia. Its flag was adopted on 9 September 1923. It was divided into 6 stripes, placed in 2 colums, in 3 rows. They were altering between black and white colour. Its design had been the combination of the flags of provinces of Posen and West Prussia. The flag was used until 1935, when Nazi Germany forbid its provinces from using its flags, ordering them to replace them with the national flag.

The Greater Poland Voivodeship was established in 1999. Its flag had been adopted on 31 January 2000 by the Greater Poland Voivodeship Sejmik.

== See also ==
- Coat of arms of the Greater Poland Voivodeship
- List of non-rectangular flags
