= Marek Woźniak =

Polish politician

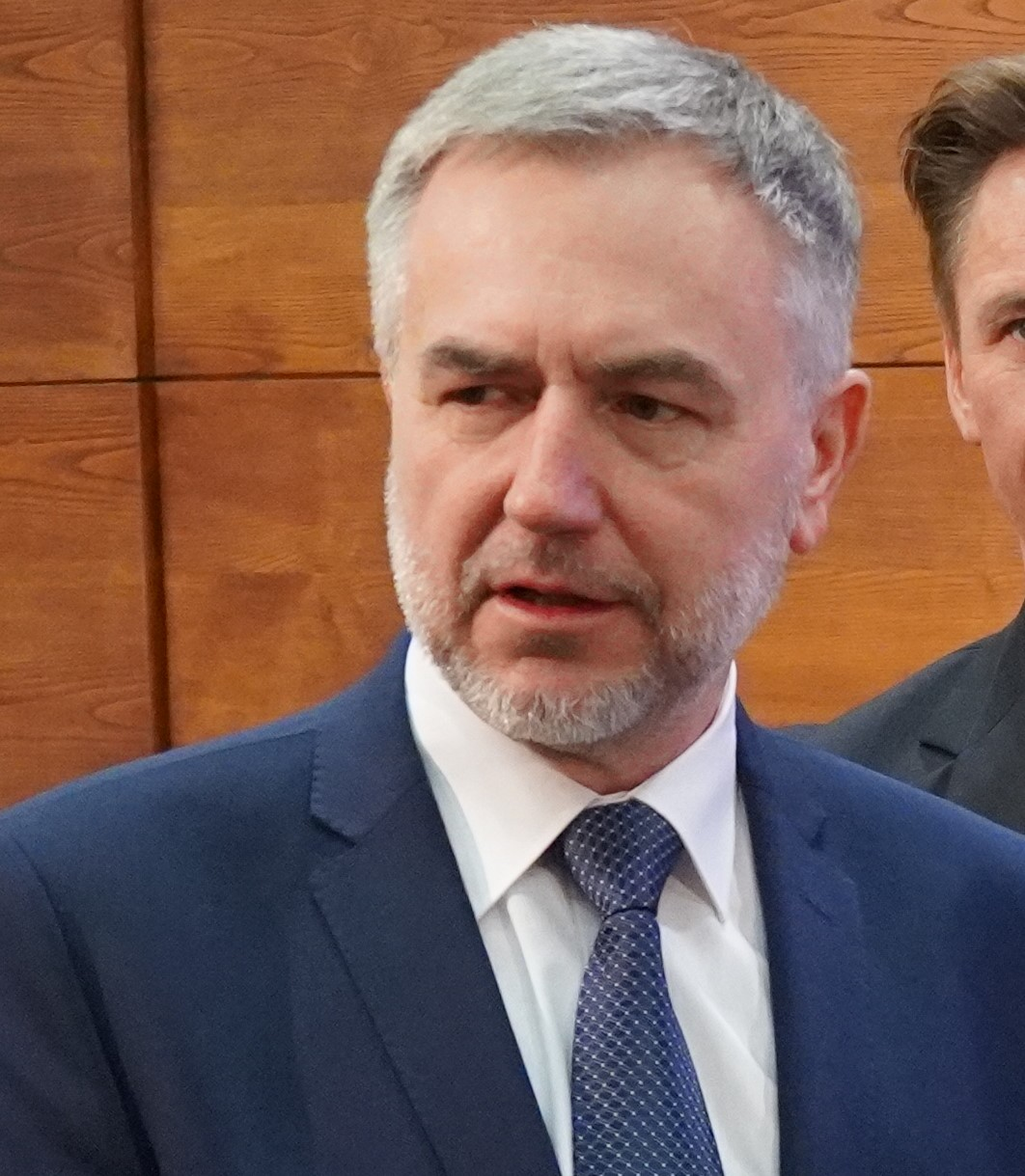

2nd Marshal of Greater Poland Voivodeship
- Incumbent
- Assumed office 10 October 2005
- Preceded by: Stefan Mikołajczak

Personal details
- Born: 5 March 1960 (age 66) Kalisz, Poland
- Party: Civic Platform
- Education: Adam Mickiewicz University in Poznań
- Awards: Order of Polonia Restituta
- Website: http://marekwozniak.pl

Marek Woźniak (born 5 March 1959) is a Polish politician who has served as Marshal of Greater Poland Voivodeship since October 2005.

== Biography ==
He was born in Kalisz, Poland, son of Mieczysław and Bożena. He graduated from Primary School No. 16 in Kalisz and Secondary School No. 3 in Poznań. He then graduated from the Faculty of History of the Adam Mickiewicz University in Poznań. He also completed Postgraduate Studies in Territorial Self-Government and Local Politics and Management. In the years 1990–1994 he was the secretary of the Suchy Las Commune, then he served as the plenipotentiary of the Poznań voivode. From 1998, he headed the District Office in Poznań, as a representative for the creation of the Poznań district. From 1998 he was a councilor, and from 2002 to 2005 also a deputy mayor of this district.

In October 2005, he took up the position of Marshal of Greater Poland Voivodeship. He retained this position after the local elections in 2006, in which he also won a mandate as a councilor of the 3rd term of office from the Civic Platform list. In the 2010 elections, he was elected as a voivodeship councilor for the second time. On December 1 of the same year, he took up the position of marshal for the third time. In 2014, he ran unsuccessfully for the European Parliament; However, in the same year he was elected again to the Greater Poland Voivodeship Sejmik, and on December 1, 2014 he again became the marshal. He also retained his mandate as a councilor in the 2018 Polish local elections, and as a result of the vote of November 23, 2018, he remained in the position of voivodeship marshal.
