= Greater Poland Voivodeship =

Voivodeship in west-central Poland

Greater Poland Voivodeship Województwo wielkopolskie
- Voivodeship
- Flag Coat of arms Brandmark

- Location within Poland

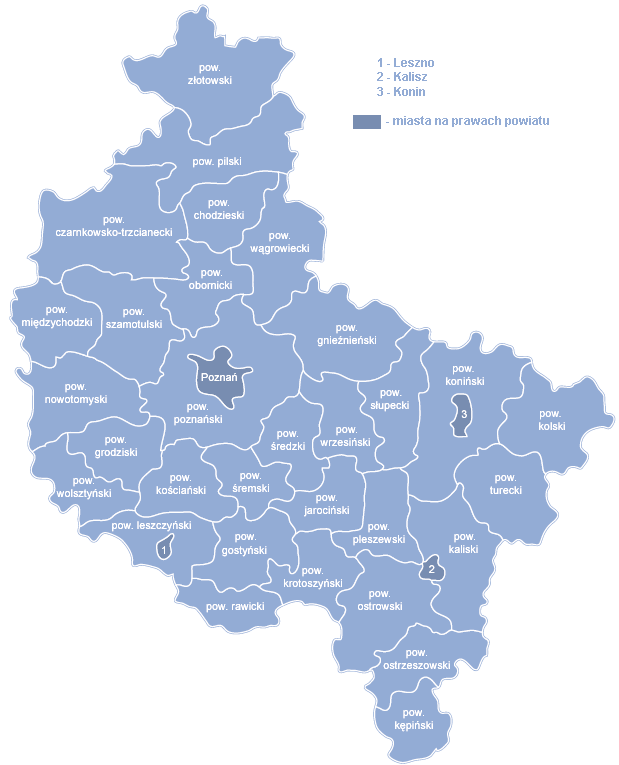
- Division into counties
- Coordinates (Poznań): 52°17′34″N 16°44′8″E 52°20′02″N 17°14′50″E
- Country: Poland
- Capital: Poznań
- Counties: 4 cities, 31 land counties *: Kalisz; Konin; Leszno; Poznań; Chodzież County; Czarnków-Trzcianka County; Gniezno County; Gostyń County; Grodzisk County; Jarocin County; Kalisz County; Kępno County; Koło County; Konin County; Kościan County; Krotoszyn County; Leszno County; Międzychód County; Nowy Tomyśl County; Oborniki County; Ostrów County; Ostrzeszów County; Piła County; Pleszew County; Poznań County; Rawicz County; Słupca County; Szamotuły County; Środa County; Śrem County; Turek County; Wągrowiec County; Wolsztyn County; Września County; Złotów County

Government
  - Body: Greater Poland Voivodeship executive board
  - Voivode: Agata Sobczyk (PL2050)
  - Marshal: Marek Woźniak (PO)
  - EP: Greater Poland

Area
  - Total: 29,826 km^{2} (11,516 sq mi)

Population (2023 (Jun))
  - Total: 3,594,363
  - Density: 120.51/km^{2} (312.12/sq mi)
  - Urban: 1,892,609
  - Rural: 1,602,861

GDP
  - Total: €83.567 billion (2024)
  - Per capita: €24,342 (2024)
- Time zone: UTC+1 (CET)
  - Summer (DST): UTC+2 (CEST)
- ISO 3166 code: PL-30
- Vehicle registration: P
- HDI (2021): 0.884 very high · 5th
- Primary airport: Poznań–Ławica Airport
- Website: www.poznan.uw.gov.pl
- further divided into 226 gminas.

Greater Poland Voivodeship (Polish: województwo wielkopolskie [vɔjɛˈvut͡stfɔ vjɛlkɔˈpɔlskʲɛ]) is a voivodeship, or province, in west-central Poland. The province is named after the region called Greater Poland (Wielkopolska [vjɛlkɔˈpɔlska]). The modern province includes most of this historic region, except for some western and northern parts.

Greater Poland Voivodeship is second in area and third in population among Poland's sixteen voivodeships, with an area of 29,826 square kilometres (11,516 sq mi) and a population of close to 3.5 million. Its capital city is Poznań; other important cities include Kalisz, Konin, Piła, Ostrów Wielkopolski, Gniezno (an early capital of Poland) and Leszno. It is bordered by seven other voivodeships: West Pomeranian to the northwest, Pomeranian to the north, Kuyavian-Pomeranian to the north-east, Łódź to the south-east, Opole to the south, Lower Silesian to the southwest and Lubusz to the west.

== History ==
Greater Poland, sometimes called the "cradle of Poland," formed the heart of the 10th-century early Polish state. Poznań and Gniezno were early centers of royal power, but following the region's devastation by pagan rebellion in the 1030s, and an invasion by Bretislaus I of Bohemia in 1038, the capital was moved by Casimir the Restorer from Gniezno to Kraków. The two cities are seats of Poland's oldest diocese (Poznań, est. in 968) and archdiocese (Gniezno, est. in 1000), playing a crucial role in the Christianization of Poland.

Historical coat of arms of the Kalisz Region in Greater Poland

In the testament of Bolesław III Wrymouth, which initiated the period of fragmentation of Poland (1138–1320), the western part of Greater Poland (including Poznań) was granted to Mieszko III the Old. The eastern part, with Gniezno and Kalisz, was part of the Duchy of Kraków, granted to Władysław II the Exile. However, for most of the period the two parts were under a single ruler, and were known as the Duchy of Greater Poland (although at times there were separately ruled duchies of Poznań, Gniezno, Kalisz and Ujście). It was one of the leading and fastest developing regions of Poland, with municipal rights modeled after Poznań and Kalisz becoming the basis of municipal form of government for several towns in the region, as two of five local Polish variants of medieval town rights. The region came under the control of Władysław I the Elbow-High in 1314, and thus became part of the reunited Poland of which Władysław was crowned king in 1320.

In the reunited kingdom, and later in the Polish–Lithuanian Commonwealth, the country came to be divided into administrative units called voivodeships. In the case of the Greater Poland region these were Poznań Voivodeship and Kalisz Voivodeship. The Commonwealth also had larger subdivisions known as prowincja, one of which was named Greater Poland. However, this prowincja covered a larger area than the Greater Poland region itself, also taking in Kuyavia, Masovia and Royal Prussia. (This division of Crown Poland into two entities called Greater and Lesser Poland had its roots in the Statutes of Casimir the Great of 1346–1362, where the laws of "Greater Poland" – the northern part of the country – were codified in the Piotrków statute, with those of "Lesser Poland" in the separate Wiślica statute.)

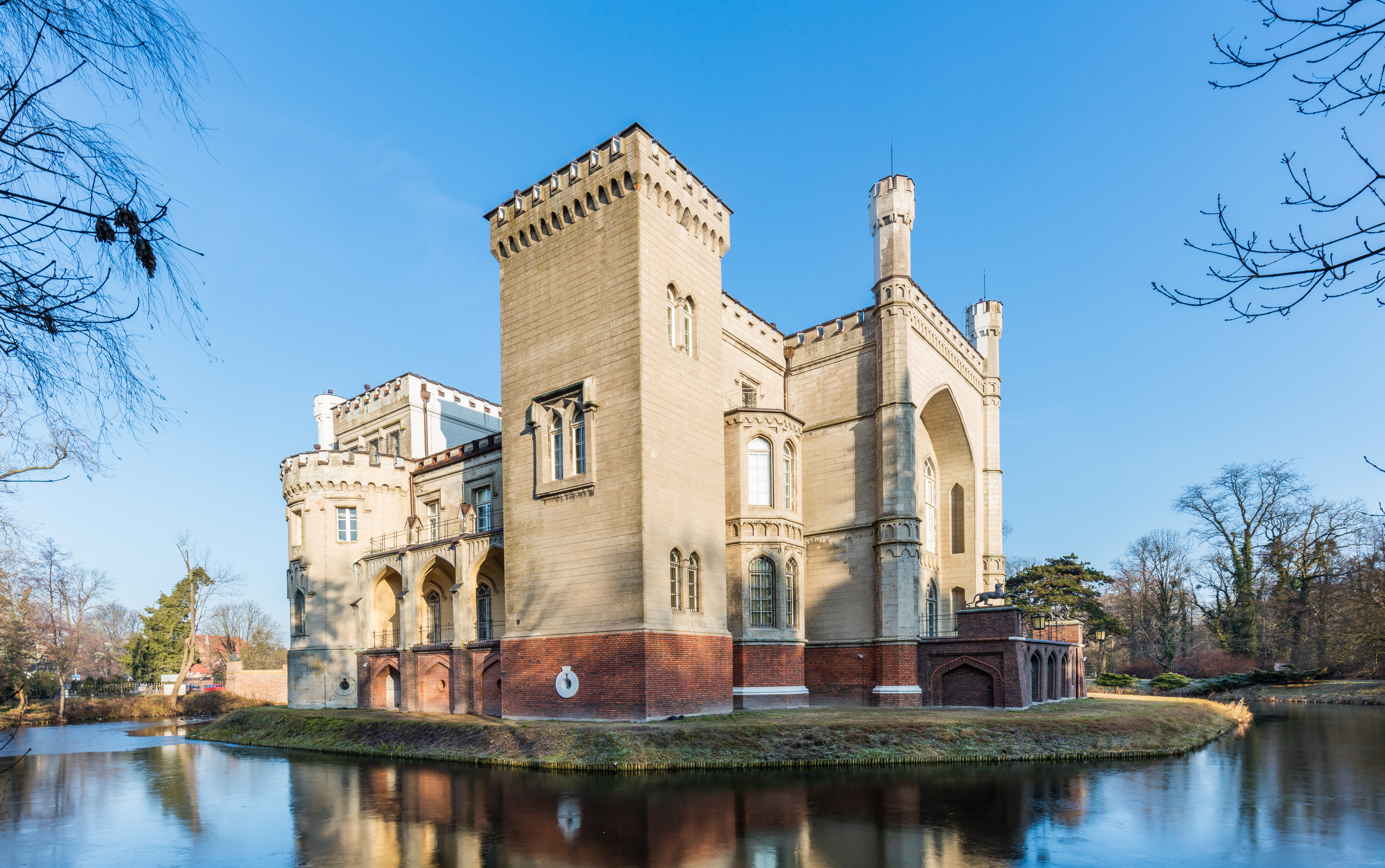
Kórnik Castle

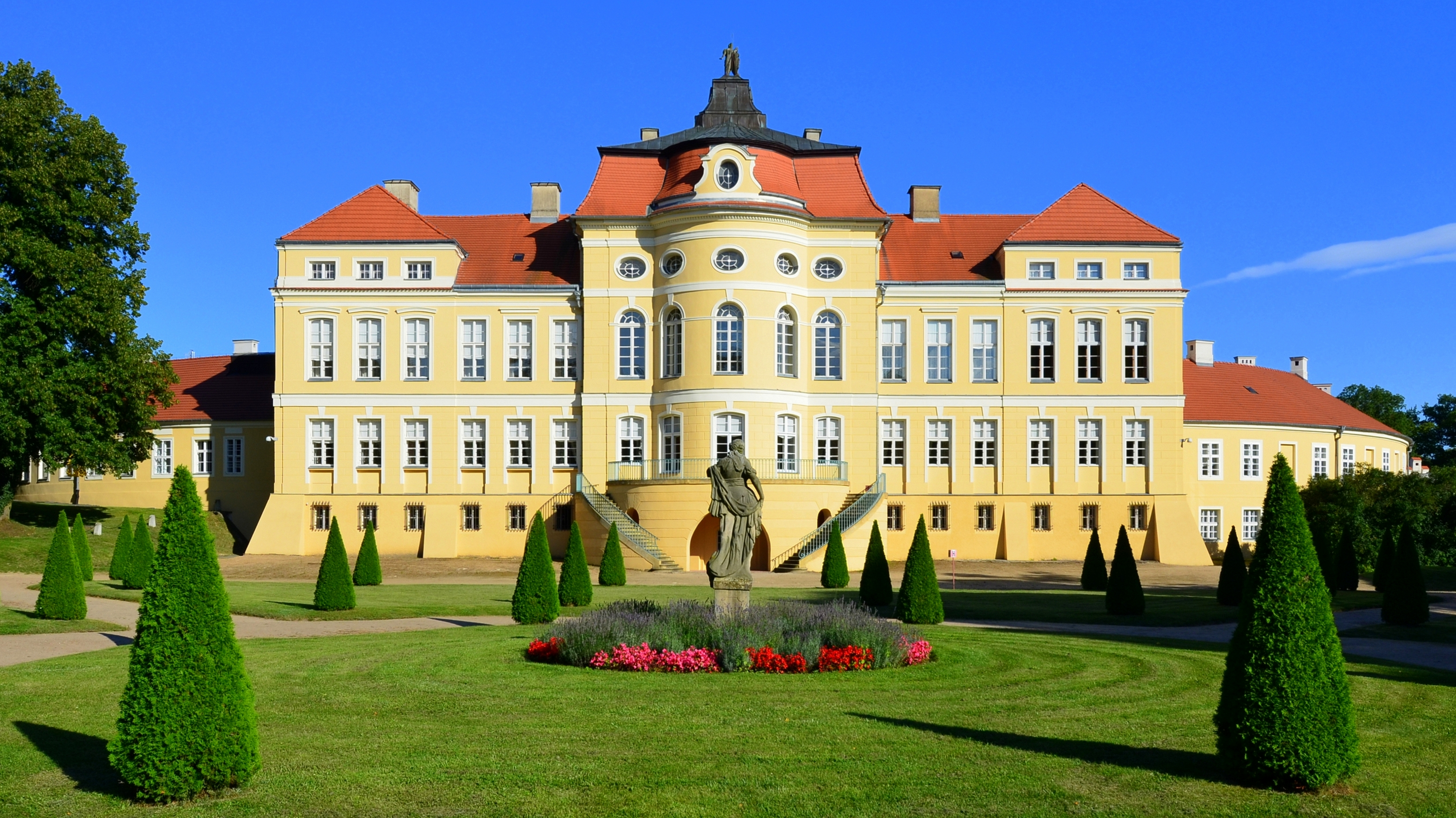
Rogalin Palace

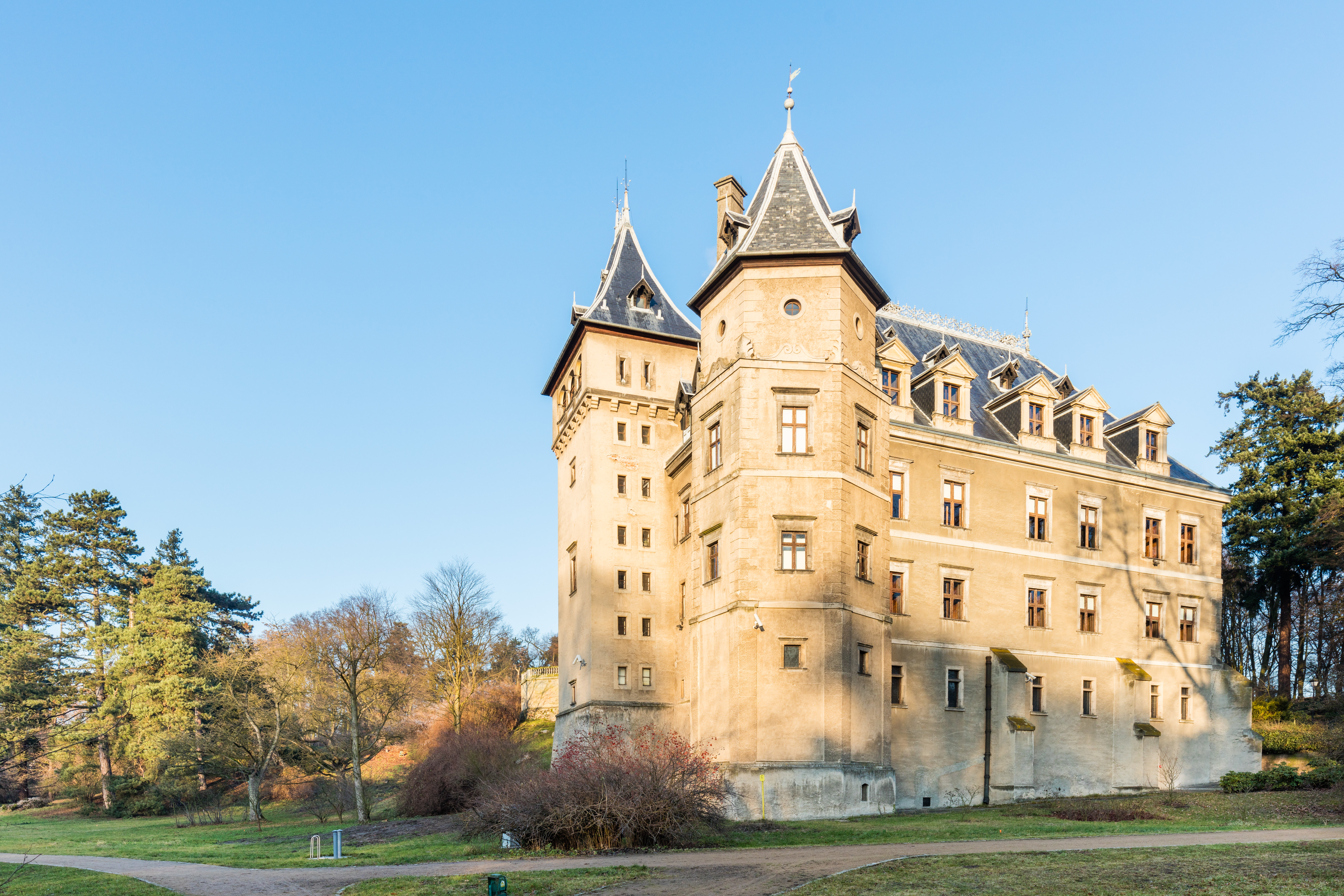
Gołuchów Castle

In 1768, a new Gniezno Voivodeship was formed out of the northern part of Kalisz Voivodeship. However more far-reaching changes would come with the Partitions of Poland. In the first partition (1772), northern parts of Greater Poland along the Noteć (German Netze) were taken over by Prussia, becoming the Netze District. In the second partition (1793) the whole of Greater Poland was absorbed by Prussia, becoming part of the province of South Prussia. It remained so in spite of the first Greater Poland Uprising (1794), part of the unsuccessful Kościuszko Uprising directed chiefly against the Russian Empire.

More successful was the Greater Poland Uprising of 1806, which led to the region's becoming part of the Napoleonic Duchy of Warsaw (forming the Poznań Department and parts of the Kalisz and Bydgoszcz Departments). However, following the Congress of Vienna in 1815, Greater Poland was again partitioned, with the western part (including Poznań) going to Prussia. The eastern part joined the Russian-controlled Kingdom of Poland, where it formed the Kalisz Voivodeship until 1837, then the Kalisz Governorate (merged into the Warsaw Governorate between 1844 and 1867).

Within the Prussian empire, western Greater Poland became the Grand Duchy of Posen (Poznań), which theoretically held some autonomy. Following an unrealized uprising in 1846, and the more substantial but still unsuccessful uprising of 1848 (during the Spring of Nations), the Grand Duchy was replaced by the Province of Posen. The authorities made efforts to Germanize the region, particularly after the founding of Germany in 1871, and from 1886 onwards the Prussian Settlement Commission was active in increasing German land ownership in formerly Polish areas.

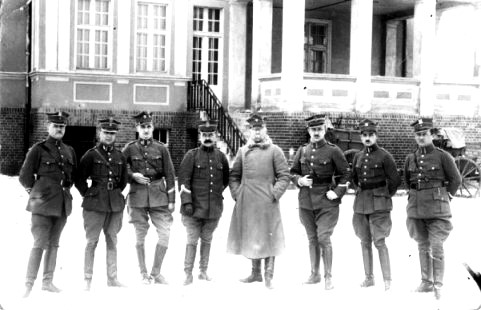
Soldiers during Greater Poland Uprising of 1918–1919

Following the end of World War I, the Greater Poland uprising (1918–1919) ensured that most of the region became part of the newly independent Polish state, forming most of Poznań Voivodeship (1919–1939). Northern and some western parts of Greater Poland remained in Germany, where they formed much of the province of Posen–West Prussia (1922–1938), whose capital was Schneidemühl (Piła).

Following the German invasion of 1939, Greater Poland was incorporated into Nazi Germany, becoming the province called Reichsgau Posen, later Reichsgau Wartheland (Warthe being the German name for the Warta river). The Polish population was oppressed, with many former officials and others considered potential enemies by the Nazis being imprisoned or executed, including at the notorious Fort VII concentration camp in Poznań. The Polish population was also subjected to expulsions, kidnapping of children and forced labour. Germany also operated the Stalag XXI-A, Stalag XXI-C, Stalag XXI-D and other prisoner-of-war camps for Polish, French, British, Moroccan, Algerian, Dutch, Belgian, Serbian, Italian, American, Norwegian, and Soviet POWs. Poznań was declared a stronghold city (Festung) in the closing stages of the war, being taken by the Red Army in the Battle of Poznań, which ended on 22 February 1945.

After the war, Greater Poland was fully within the Polish People's Republic, as Poznań Voivodeship. With the reforms of 1975 this was divided into smaller provinces (the voivodeships of Kalisz, Konin, Leszno and Piła, and a smaller Poznań Voivodeship). The present-day Greater Poland Voivodeship, again with Poznań as its capital, was created on 1 January 1999 out of the former Poznań, Kalisz, Konin, Piła and Leszno Voivodeships, pursuant to the Polish local government reforms adopted in 1998.

== Cities and towns ==
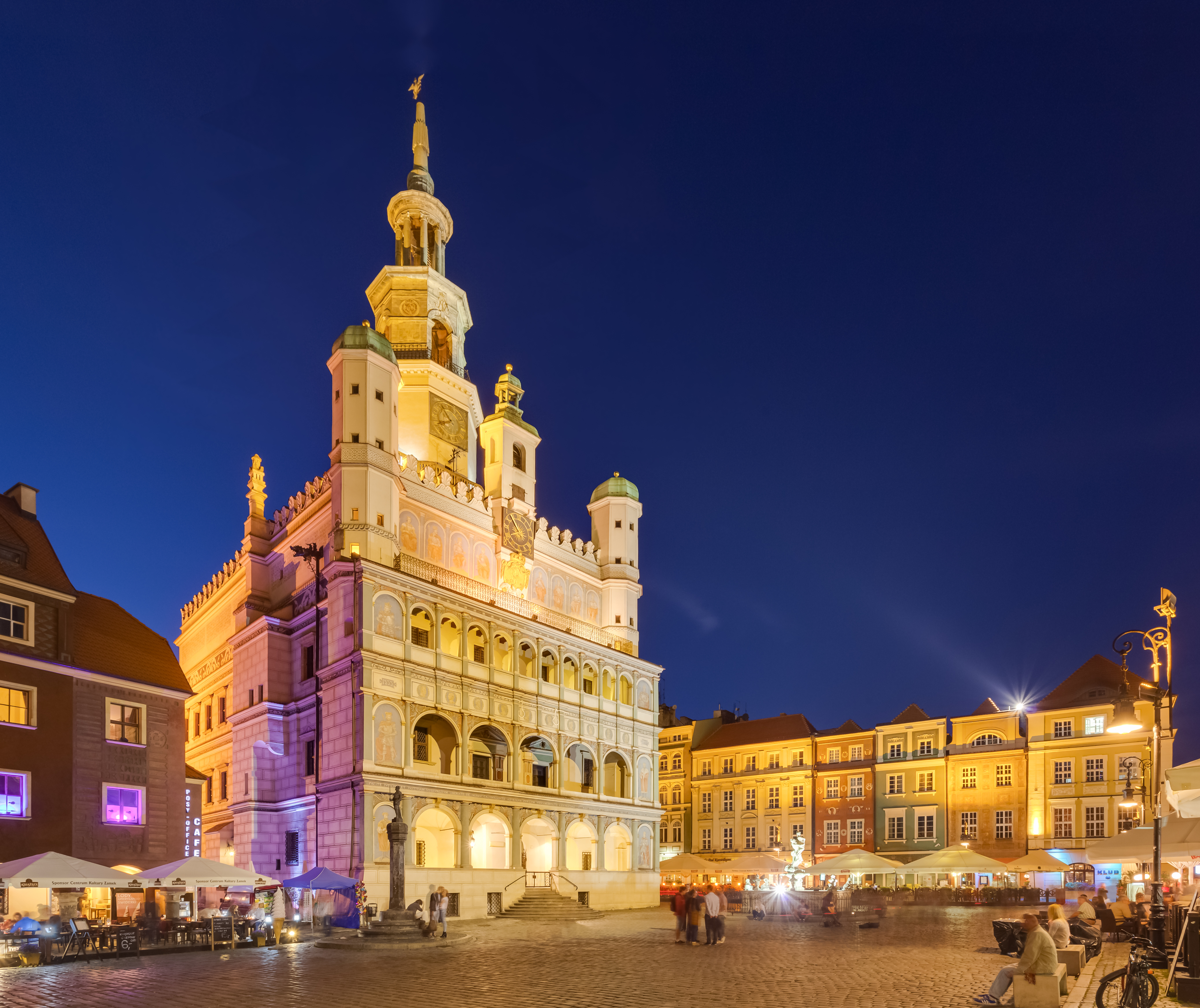
Poznań is the capital of Greater Poland Voivodeship

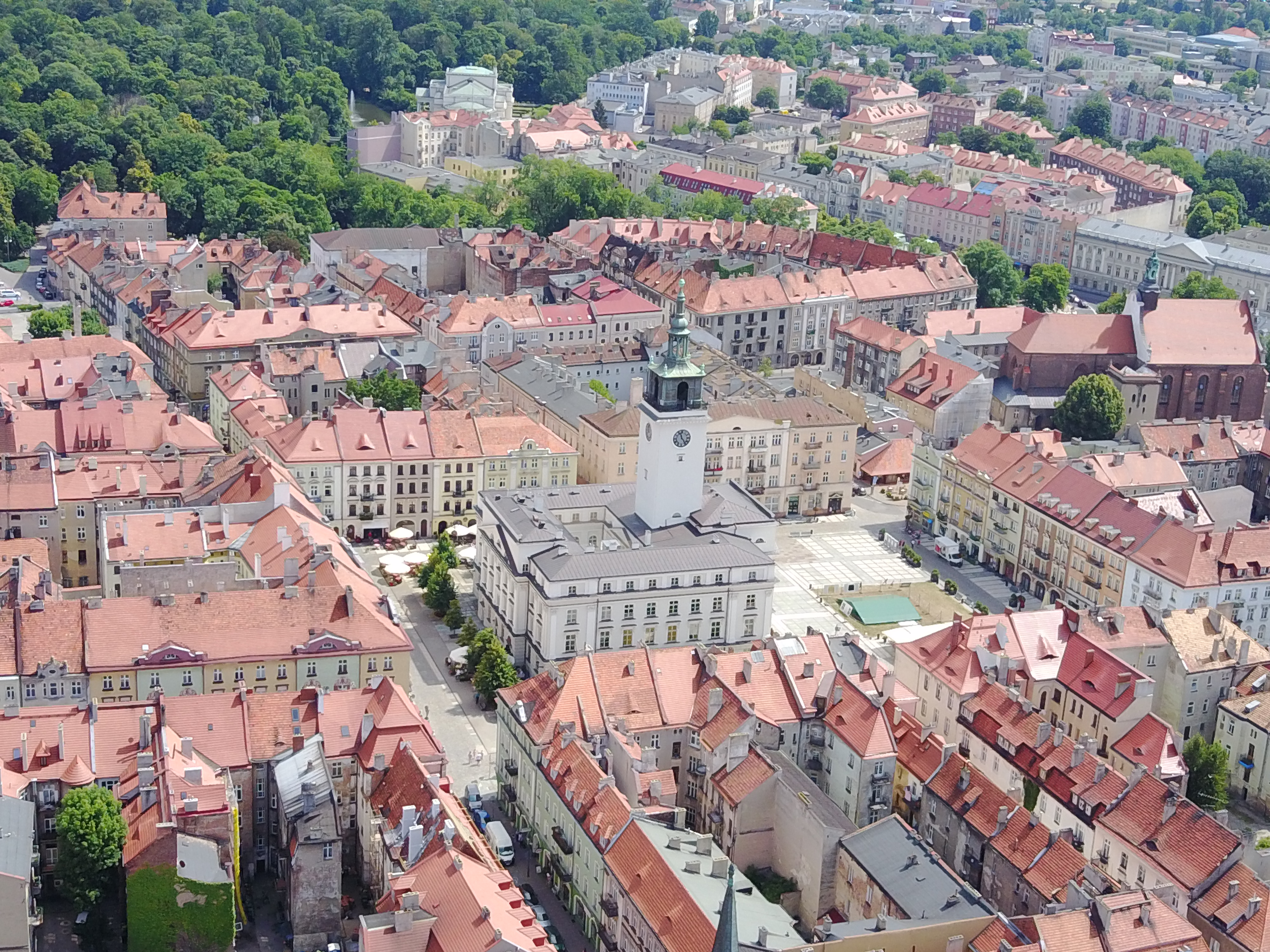
Kalisz, one of the oldest cities of Poland and capital of the Kalisz Region, traditional subregion of Greater Poland

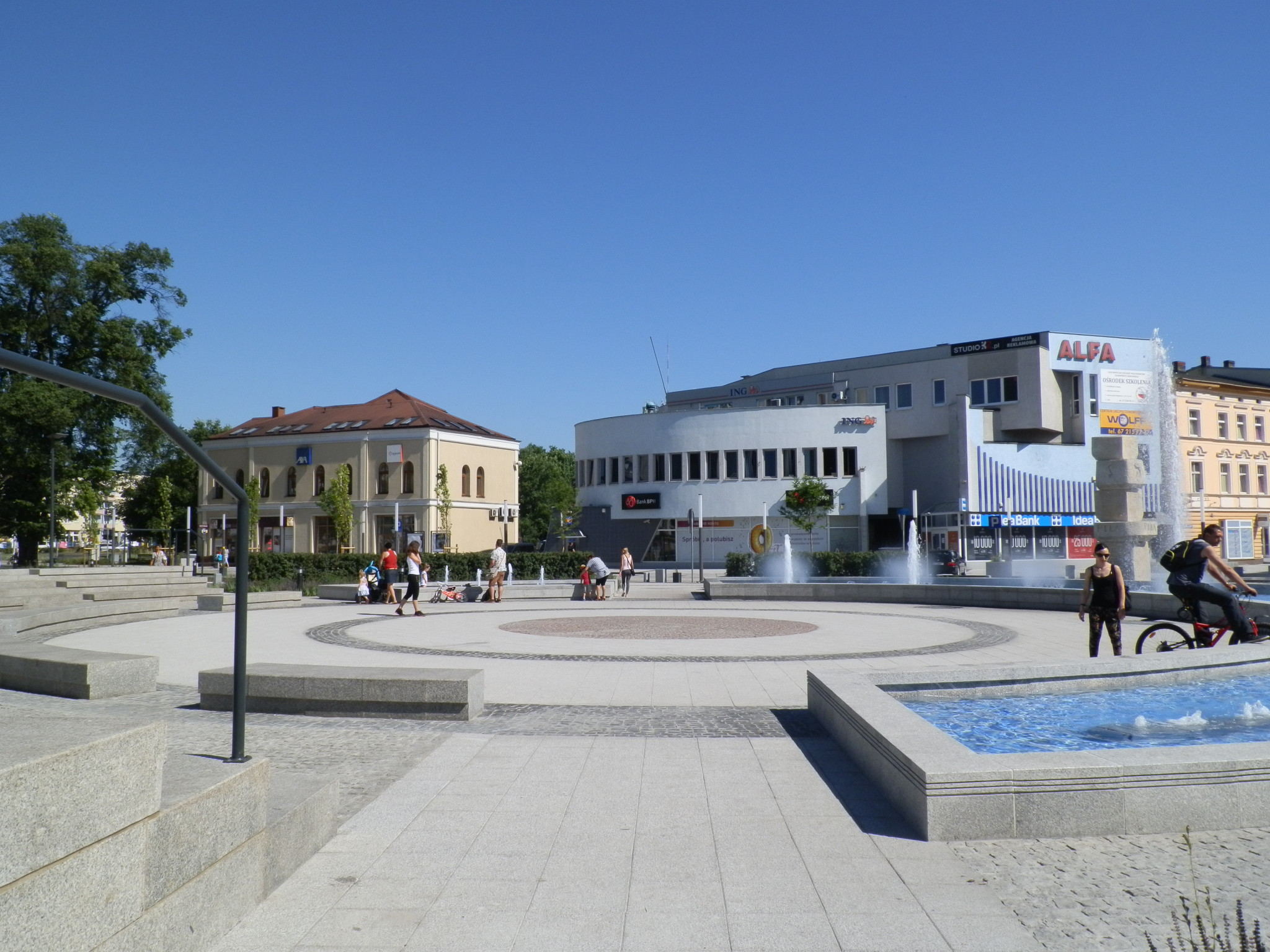
Piła, largest city of the Krajna ethnocultural subregion in the north

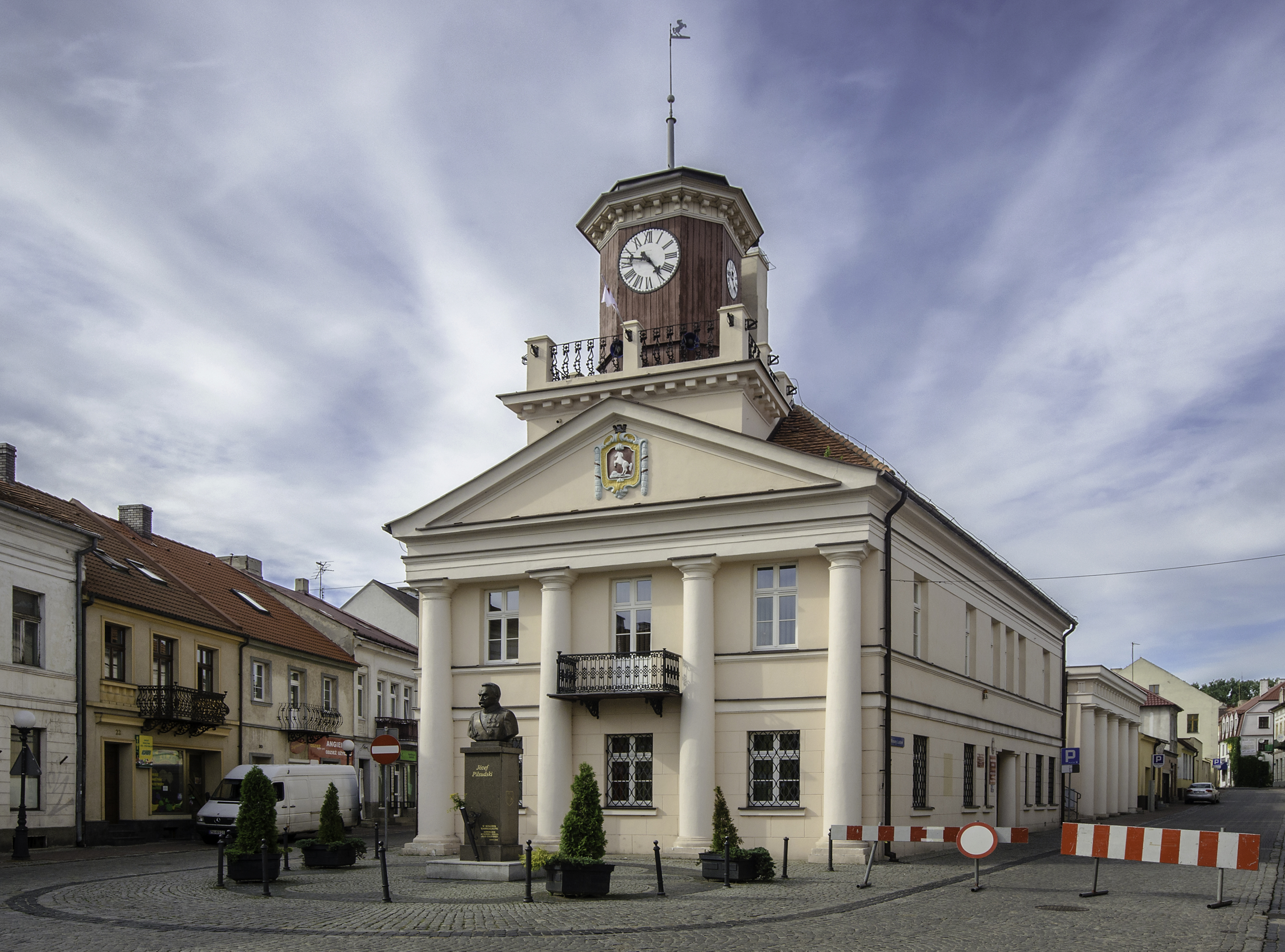
Konin, coal mining center

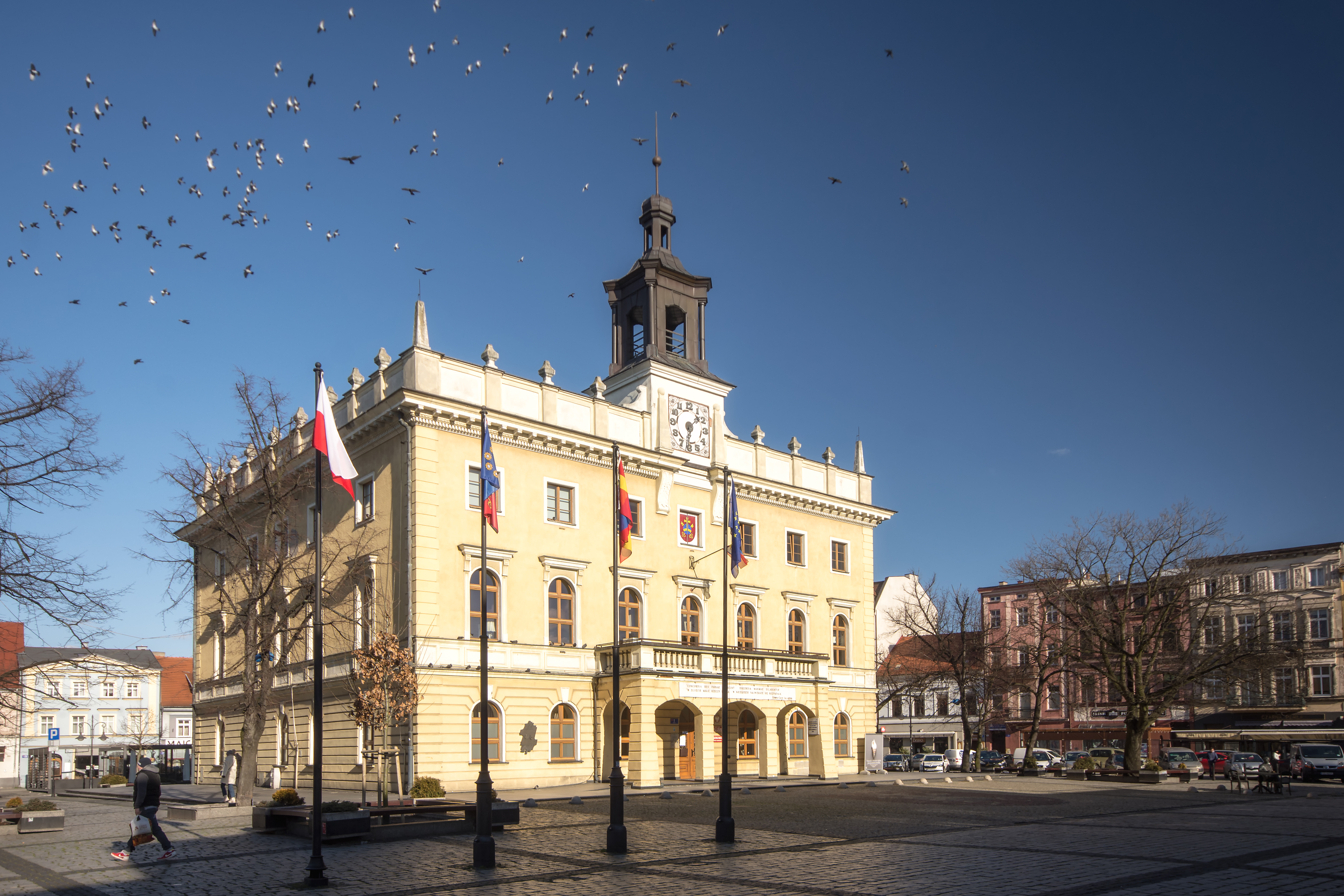
Ostrów Wielkopolski, part of Kalisz-Ostrów Wielkopolski metropolitan area, second largest metropolitan area in the province

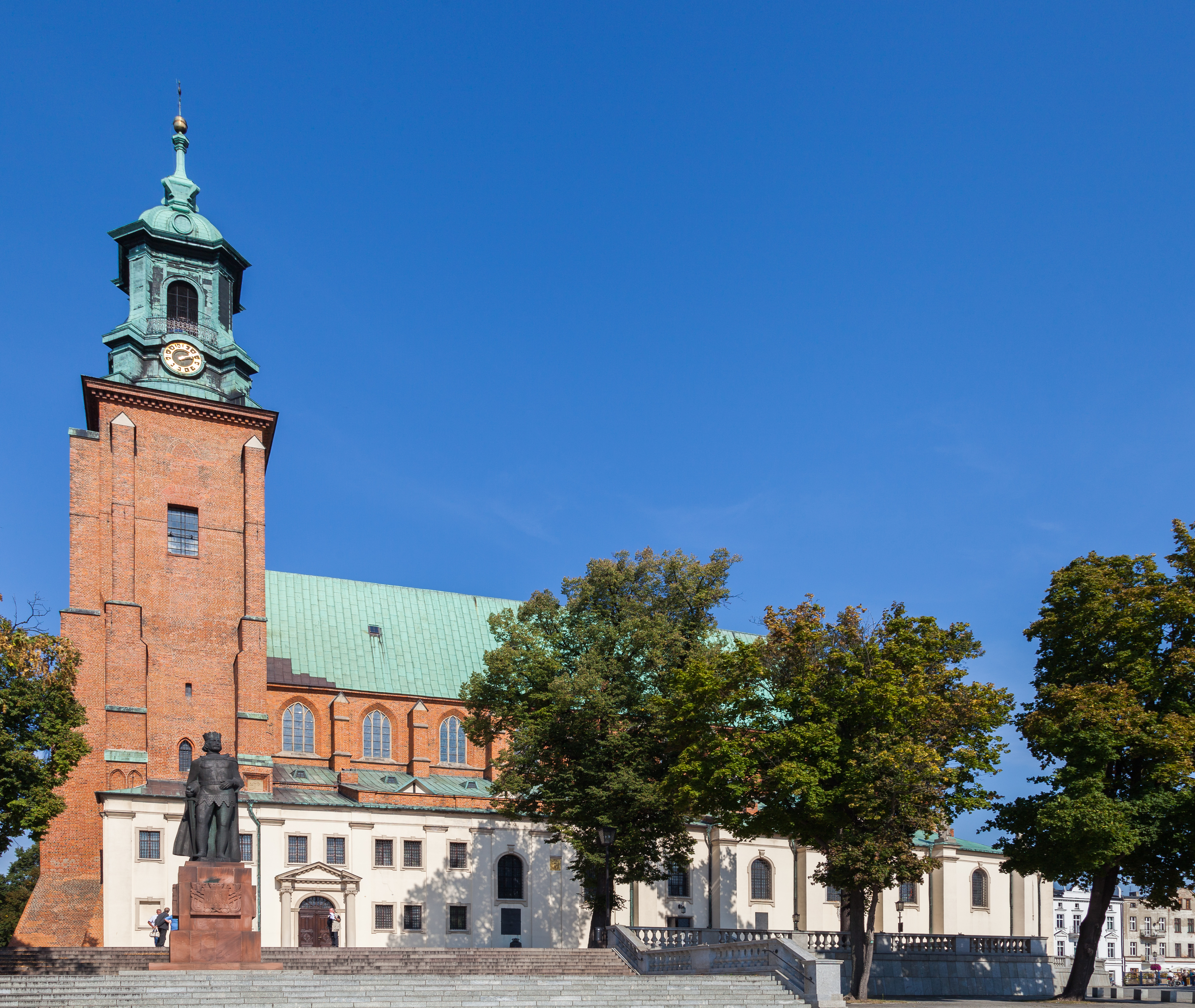
Gniezno, former medieval capital of Poland, seat of the Catholic Primate of Poland

Historical population
Year	Pop.	±%
1988	3,236,618	—
2002	3,351,915	+3.6%
2011	3,447,441	+2.8%
2021	3,504,579	+1.7%

The voivodeship contains seven cities and 106 towns. These are listed below in descending order of population (according to official figures for 2019):

Cities (governed by a city mayor or prezydent miasta):
1. Poznań (535,802)
2. Kalisz (100,482)
3. Piła (71,846)
4. Konin (71,427)
5. Ostrów Wielkopolski (71,947)
6. Gniezno (68,323)
7. Leszno (63,774)

Towns:

1. Luboń (31,891)
2. Września (30,688)
3. Swarzędz (30,343)
4. Śrem (29,566)
5. Krotoszyn (28,845)
6. Turek (26,955)
7. Jarocin (26,155)
8. Wągrowiec (25,675)
9. Kościan (23,880)
10. Środa Wielkopolska (23,368)
11. Koło (21,838)
12. Gostyń (20,235)
13. Rawicz (20,225)
14. Szamotuły (18,752)
15. Chodzież (18,602)
16. Złotów (18,498)
17. Oborniki (18,104)
18. Pleszew (17,297)
19. Trzcianka (17,159)
20. Grodzisk Wielkopolski (14,644)
21. Nowy Tomyśl (14,574)
22. Ostrzeszów (14,137)
23. Kępno (14,101)
24. Mosina (14,060)
25. Słupca (13,712)
26. Wolsztyn (13,107)
27. Wronki (11,173)
28. Rogoźno (11,128)
29. Czarnków (10,675)
30. Międzychód (10,574)
31. Murowana Goślina (10,387)
32. Puszczykowo (9,695)
33. Kostrzyn (9,674)
34. Opalenica (9,587)
35. Pobiedziska (9,259)
36. Jastrowie (8,597)
37. Pniewy (8,047)
38. Kórnik (7,894)
39. Witkowo (7,828)
40. Trzemeszno (7,661)
41. Zbąszyń (7,264)
42. Koźmin Wielkopolski (6,499)
43. Kłodawa (6,446)
44. Krzyż Wielkopolski (6,220)
45. Buk (6,036)
46. Sieraków (6,031)
47. Stęszew (5,946)
48. Wieleń (5,870)
49. Śmigiel (5,688)
50. Czempiń (5,297)
51. Wyrzysk (5,146)
52. Odolanów (5,135)
53. Nowe Skalmierzyce (4,751)
54. Zduny (4,512)
55. Golina (4,495)
56. Skoki (4,407)
57. Krobia (4,325)
58. Szamocin (4,223)
59. Kleczew (4,159)
60. Okonek (3,869)
61. Nekla (3,791)
62. Ujście (3,695)
63. Opatówek (3,673)
64. Krajenka (3,647)
65. Rakoniewice (3,594)
66. Miłosław (3,576)
67. Sompolno (3,539)
68. Gołańcz (3,310)
69. Tuliszków (3,266)
70. Kobylin (3,249)
71. Miejska Górka (3,232)
72. Ślesin (3,153)
73. Dobrzyca (3,130)
74. Pyzdry (3,127)
75. Margonin (2,988)
76. Zagórów (2,985)
77. Lwówek (2,964)
78. Łobżenica (2,951)
79. Bojanowo (2,906)
80. Rydzyna (2,895)
81. Kaczory
82. Sulmierzyce (2,880)
83. Poniec (2,859)
84. Książ Wielkopolski (2,715)
85. Czerniejewo (2,666)
86. Kłecko (2,632)
87. Wysoka (2,628)
88. Borek Wielkopolski (2,508)
89. Obrzycko (2,382)
90. Rychwał (2,372)
91. Osieczna (2,352)
92. Mieścisko
93. Żerków (2,121)
94. Raszków (2,108)
95. Pogorzela (2,095)
96. Dąbie (1,999)
97. Jutrosin (1,984)
98. Grabów nad Prosną (1,939)
99. Ostroróg (1,908)
100. Koźminek
101. Mikstat (1,837)
102. Chocz (1,790)
103. Wielichowo (1,755)
104. Krzywiń (1,706)
105. Przedecz (1,667)
106. Dolsk (1,558)
107. Stawiszyn (1,520)
108. Jaraczewo (1,412)
109. Rychtal
110. Dobra (1,390)
111. Miasteczko Krajeńskie
112. Zaniemyśl

== Geography ==
=== Topography ===
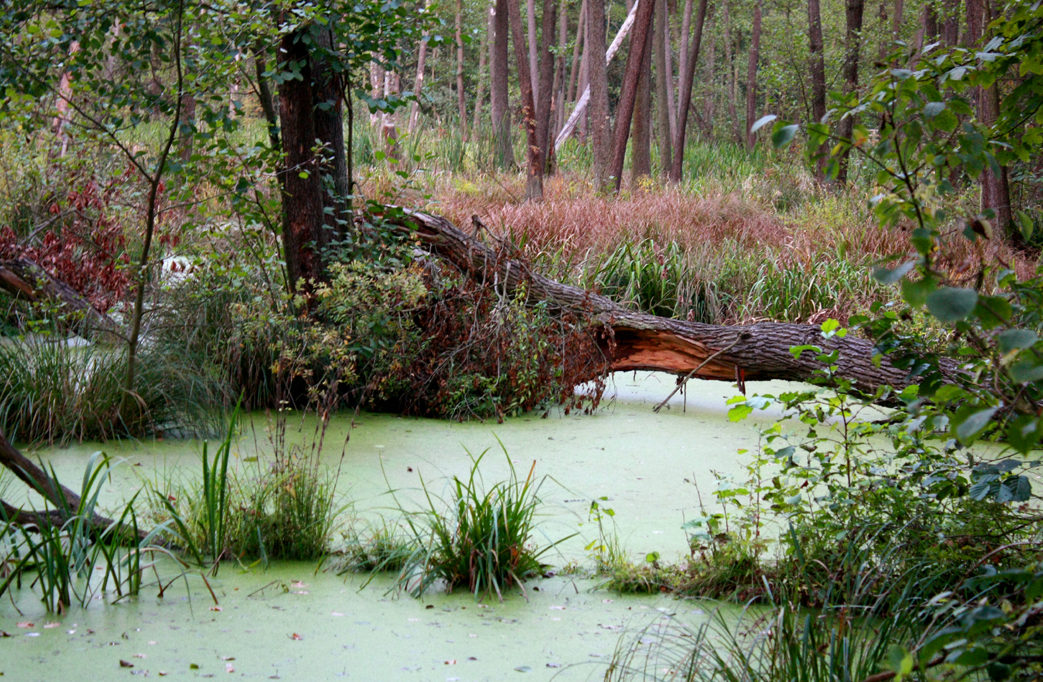
The Barycz Valley Landscape Park

The relief of Greater Poland, geological conditions and soil have been shaped by two glaciations:

- The Baltic glaciation in the lowlands of northern and central Europe where there are now numerous lakes of the Pomeranian Lake District, a feature especially common in and around Poznań and Gniezno.
- The Mid-glaciation in the southern part of the province, where there is less terrain diversity and a lack of major lakes.

The highest elevation is Greater Kobyla Mountain (284 m (932 ft)) in the Ostrzeszowski Hills, the lowest area is located in the valley of the Warta River at the mouth of its tributary the Noteć (21 m (69 ft)) in the north-western part of the region. Agriculturally fertile soils account for around 60% of the province's area, while 20%, the rest of the non-forested or urban areas, is mostly wetland soil (muck-peat and alluvial soils).

An area of approximately 800,000 hectares (2,000,000 acres) is covered by forests, this represents around 25.8% of the total surface area of the region. In the lake districts of the northern and central parts of the province there are about 800 lakes; 58% of which cover an area of at least 10 hectares (25 acres) and 8%, with an area exceeding 100 hectares (250 acres). The largest reservoir is the natural Greater Powidzkie Lake (1,036 ha (2,560 acres)) in the Gniezno Lake District.

Wielkopolska Region lies within the basin of the Oder River, 88% of the province's surface water drains into the Warta river basin, and the remaining 12% is drained by a multitude of other river systems, including the Barycz, Ladislaus Trench and Obrzycy waterways. The quality of river waters is generally poor, but their condition is gradually improving and should soon be classed as 'clean'.

=== Geology ===
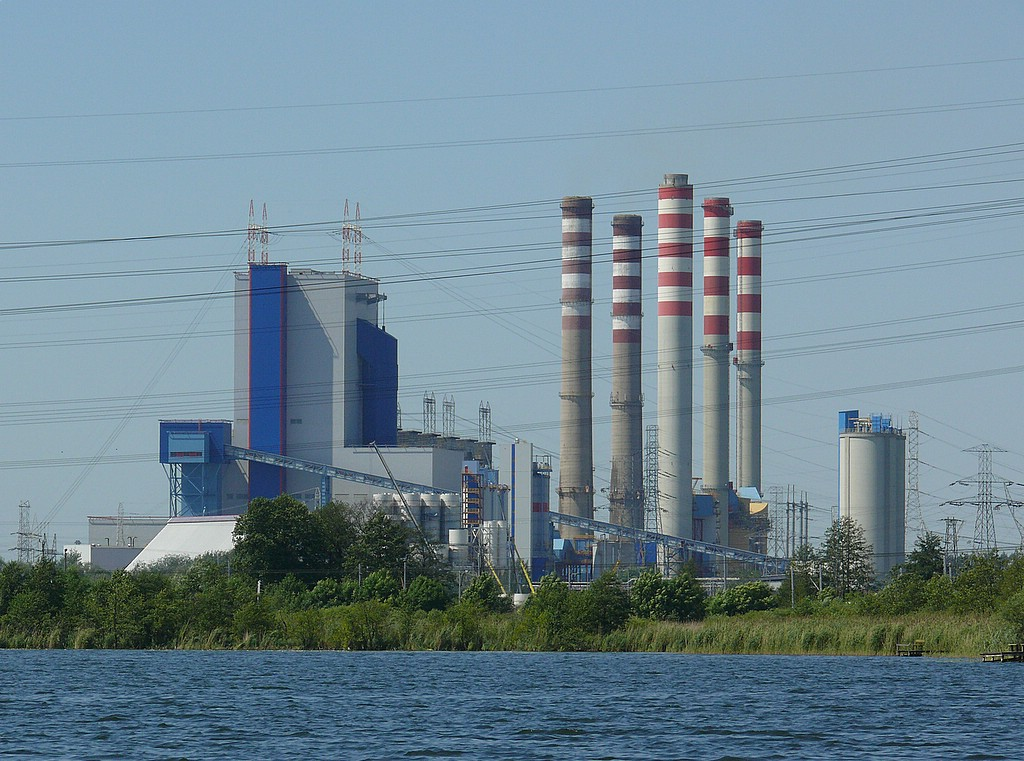
A modern coal-fired power plant in Pątnów

The main mineral energy resources in Greater Poland are lignite, natural gas, oil and peat.

Brown coal deposits are currently mined in the Konin area, and form the basis for the province's power industry (the Pątnów-Adams-Konin coal-fired power stations account for more than 10% of the national electricity production). The region also has significant quantities of peat deposits; it is calculated that there are ca. 886,000 hectares (2,190,000 acres) of land covered with an average thickness of 1.5 m (4 ft 11 in) of peat. An abundance of raw materials used in the production of numerous medicines was recently discovered in the muds of Błażejewo, Oderbank and Mechnacz. In addition, very large deposits of brown coal have been discovered in the vicinity of Kościan, these however are not currently being extracted and probably never will be extracted, due to the expense that would be incurred in adapting the site to build a coal mine and the need to resettle thousands of people.

Rock salt is mined intensively at a salt mine in Kłodawa (this mine alone accounts for about 20% of domestic production).

Throughout the province there are significant deposits of aggregates, gypsum, ceramic materials, and lacustrine chalk. In Kościan the largest and most modern, a natural gas production site is in operation. It supplies raw material for Kościańska Zieme, and Zielona Gora CHP. It is estimated that at the rate local gas reserves are being exploited, the reserves in Kościan will be enough for about 20 years of operation, thus practically allowing for local independence against the effects of gas crises.

=== Climate ===
Wielkopolska is influenced by oceanic air masses that affect the mildness of the climate. The farther east one travels the more distinctly continental the climate becomes. The area is situated in the Silesian Greater Poland agro-climatic region where the average annual temperature is about 8.2 °C, and in the north drops to around 7.6 °C. It is slightly warmer in the south and west where the average temperature is usually about 8.5 °C. The number of days with snow can reach up to 57 days in and around the Kalisz district.

The growing season is one of the longest in Poland. On the province's southern plains this season constitutes around 228 days, while north of Gniezno and Szamotuły this gradually declines to 216 days.

Precipitation ranges from 500 to 550 mm. Despite this the region is still faced with a deficit in rainfall, particularly in the eastern part of the province (around Słupcy, Kazimierz Biskupi, Kleczew) where sometimes experience only 450 mm of rainfall per year, this threatens steppization of the region. Throughout the province there is typically a prevailing westerly wind.

== Transportation ==
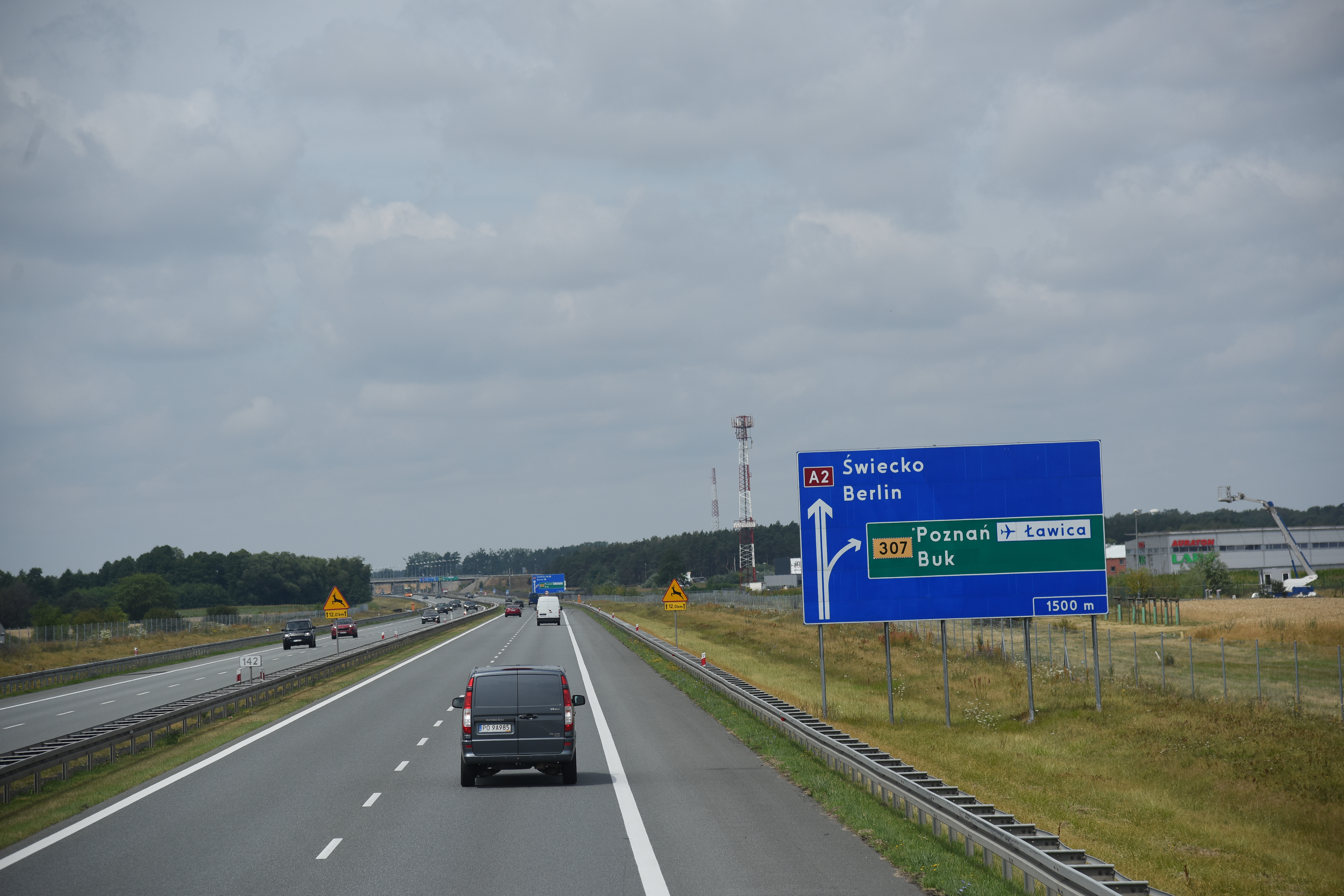
The A2 motorway traverses the voivodeship.

Greater Poland is a major transport hub within Poland; a great deal of traffic from Russia and other states of the former Soviet Union passes through Poznań and Konin to reach Germany and other EU member states. To the south runs the international route from Gdańsk via Poznań and Leszno to Prague and then to the south of Europe. There is also a major highway in the province, the A2 motorway, which when completed will run from the western border of Poland with Germany, through Poznań to Warsaw and then via Belarus to Moscow.

The main railway hubs located in Greater Poland are Poznań, Piła and Ostrów Wielkopolski. PKP Intercity operate a number of trains a day between Warsaw and Berlin which provide a fast connection for the two cities also to Poznań. This route was the first in Poland, adapted for use by the European high-speed transportation system. The Poznań Główny railway station is the second busiest railway station in Poland. In the near future the government expects to construct a high-speed rail line in the shape of a Y connecting Kalisz and Poznań from Łódź, Warsaw and Wrocław.

Poznań is the port of arrival for most international travellers as it plays host to Ławica International Airport, which has recently seen the second-highest passenger growth rate in the country.

== Economy ==
The Gross domestic product (GDP) of the province was 40.4 billion € in 2018, accounting for 8.1% of Polish economic output. GDP per capita adjusted for purchasing power was €19,700 or 65% of the EU27 average in the same year. The GDP per employee was 72% of the EU average.

== Politics ==
The Greater Poland voivodeship's government is headed by the province's voivode (governor) who is appointed by the Polish Prime Minister. The voivode is then assisted in performing his duties by the voivodeship's marshal, who is the appointed speaker for the voivodeship's executive and is elected by the sejmik (provincial assembly). The current voivode of Greater Poland is Łukasz Mikołajczyk, whilst the present marshal is Marek Woźniak.

The Sejmik of Greater Poland consists of 39 members.

=== 2018 local elections ===
Party	Mandates
Koalicja Obywatelska	15
Prawo i Sprawiedliwość	13
Polskie Stronnictwo Ludowe	7
SLD Lewica Razem	3
Independent	1
Total	39

=== Governors ===
Name	Period
Maciej Musial	1 January 1999 – 20 June 2000
Stanislaw Tamm	20 June 2000 – 22 October 2001
Andrzej Nowakowski	22 October 2001 – 28 December 2005
Tadeusz Dziuba	28 December 2005 – 29 November 2007
Piotr Florek	29 November 2007 – 10 November 2015
Zbigniew Hoffmann	8 December 2015 – 11 November 2019
Łukasz Mikołajczyk	25 November 2019 – present

== Administrative divisions ==
Greater Poland Voivodeship is divided into 35 counties (powiats): four city counties and 31 land counties. These are further divided into 226 gminas.

The counties are listed in the following table (ordering within categories is by decreasing population).

English and Polish names	Area		Population (2019)	Seat	Other towns	Total gminas
English and Polish names	(km^{2})	(sq mi)	Population (2019)	Seat	Other towns	Total gminas
City counties
Poznań	262	101	535,802			1
Kalisz	70	27	100,482			1
Konin	82	32	73,742			1
Leszno	32	12	63,774			1
Land counties
Poznań County powiat poznański	1,900	734	394,541	Poznań *	Swarzędz, Luboń, Mosina, Murowana Goślina, Puszczykowo, Kostrzyn, Pobiedziska, Kórnik, Buk, Stęszew	17
Ostrów County powiat ostrowski	1,161	448	161,526	Ostrów Wielkopolski	Nowe Skalmierzyce, Odolanów, Raszków	8
Gniezno County powiat gnieźnieński	1,254	484	145,198	Gniezno	Witkowo, Trzemeszno, Kłecko, Czerniejewo	10
Piła County powiat pilski	1,267	489	136,261	Piła	Wyrzysk, Ujście, Łobżenica, Kaczory, Wysoka, Miasteczko Krajeńskie	9
Konin County powiat koniński	1,579	610	130,026	Konin *	Golina, Kleczew, Sompolno, Ślesin, Rychwał	14
Szamotuły County powiat szamotulski	1,120	432	91,303	Szamotuły	Wronki, Pniewy, Obrzycko, Ostroróg	8
Czarnków–Trzcianka County powiat czarnkowsko-trzcianecki	1,808	698	87,231	Czarnków	Trzcianka, Krzyż Wielkopolski, Wieleń	8
Koło County powiat kolski	1,011	390	86,925	Koło	Kłodawa, Dąbie, Przedecz	11
Turek County powiat turecki	929	359	83,998	Turek	Tuliszków, Dobra	9
Kalisz County powiat kaliski	1,160	448	83,008	Kalisz *	Koźminek, Stawiszyn	11
Kościan County powiat kościański	723	279	79,171	Kościan	Śmigiel, Czempiń, Krzywiń	5
Krotoszyn County powiat krotoszyński	714	276	77,304	Krotoszyn	Koźmin Wielkopolski, Zduny, Kobylin, Sulmierzyce	6
Września County powiat wrzesiński	704	272	77,820	Września	Miłosław, Nekla, Pyzdry	5
Gostyń County powiat gostyński	810	313	75,917	Gostyń	Krobia, Poniec, Borek Wielkopolski, Pogorzela	7
Nowy Tomyśl County powiat nowotomyski	1,012	391	75,457	Nowy Tomyśl	Opalenica, Zbąszyń, Lwówek	6
Jarocin County powiat jarociński	588	227	71,595	Jarocin	Żerków	4
Wągrowiec County powiat wągrowiecki	1,041	402	70,301	Wągrowiec	Skoki, Gołańcz, Mieścisko	7
Złotów County powiat złotowski	1,661	641	69,505	Złotów	Jastrowie, Okonek, Krajenka	8
Pleszew County powiat pleszewski	712	275	63,121	Pleszew		6
Śrem County powiat śremski	574	222	61,303	Śrem	Książ Wielkopolski, Dolsk	4
Rawicz County powiat rawicki	553	214	60,344	Rawicz	Miejska Górka, Bojanowo, Jutrosin	5
Oborniki County powiat obornicki	713	275	59,819	Oborniki	Rogoźno	3
Słupca County powiat słupecki	838	324	59,246	Słupca	Zagórów	8
Środa County powiat średzki	623	241	58,664	Środa Wielkopolska		5
Wolsztyn County powiat wolsztyński	680	263	57,350	Wolsztyn		3
Kępno County powiat kępiński	608	235	56,494	Kępno	Rychtal	7
Leszno County powiat leszczyński	805	311	56,799	Leszno *	Rydzyna, Osieczna	7
Ostrzeszów County powiat ostrzeszowski	772	298	55,404	Ostrzeszów	Grabów nad Prosną, Mikstat	7
Grodzisk County powiat grodziski	644	249	51,988	Grodzisk Wielkopolski	Rakoniewice, Wielichowo	5
Chodzież County powiat chodzieski	681	263	47,168	Chodzież	Szamocin, Margonin	5
Międzychód County powiat międzychodzki	737	285	36,883	Międzychód	Sieraków	4
* seat not part of the county

== Protected areas ==
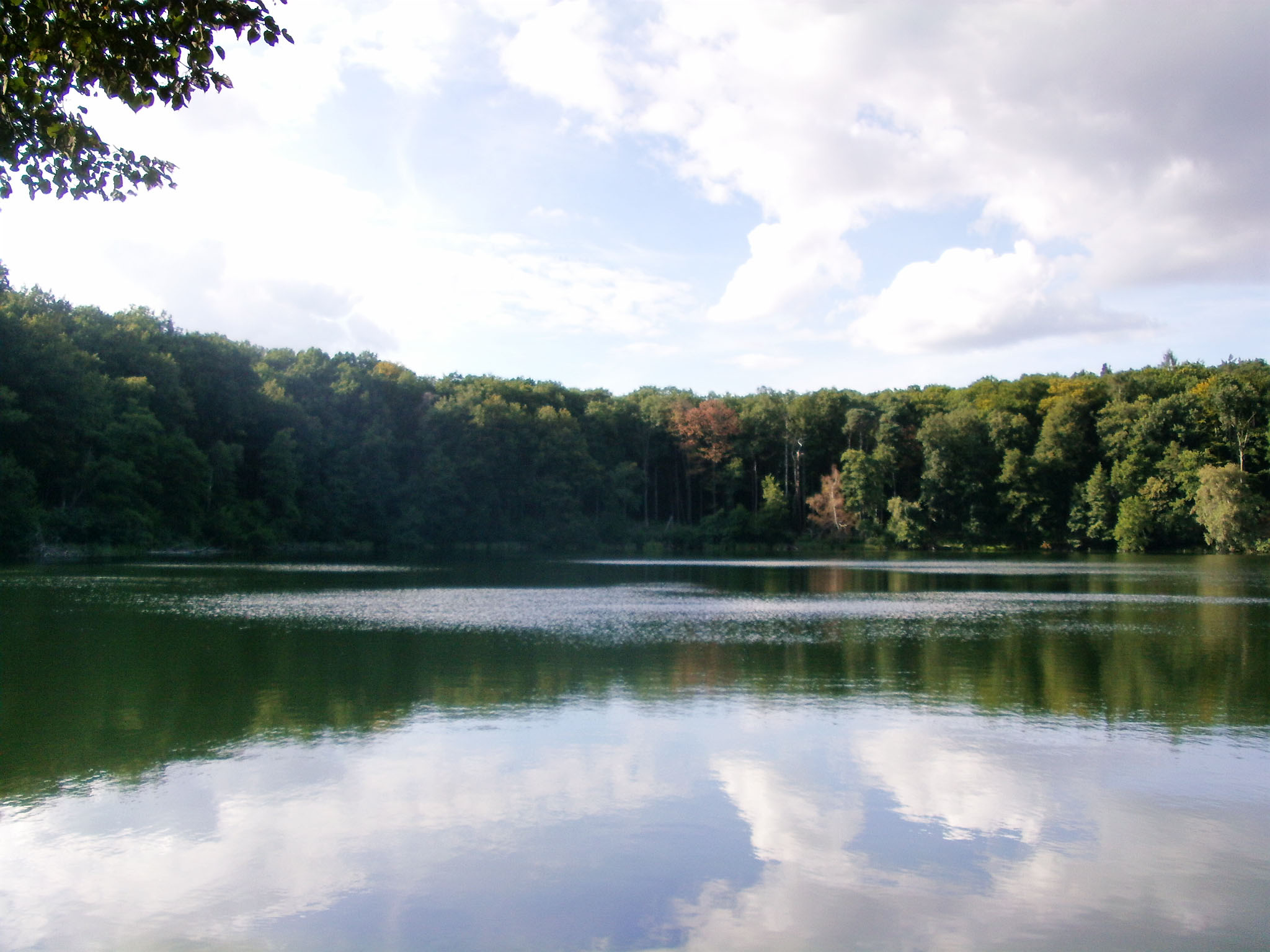
Lake Kociołek in Greater Poland National Park

Protected areas in Greater Poland Voivodeship include two National Parks and 12 Landscape Parks. These are listed below.

- Drawno National Park (partly in Lubusz and West Pomeranian Voivodeships)
- Greater Poland National Park
- Barycz Valley Landscape Park (partly in Lower Silesian Voivodeship)
- Chłapowski Landscape Park
- Lednica Landscape Park
- Powidz Landscape Park
- Promno Landscape Park
- Przemęt Landscape Park (partly in Lubusz Voivodeship)
- Pszczew Landscape Park (partly in Lubusz Voivodeship)
- Puszcza Zielonka Landscape Park
- Rogalin Landscape Park
- Sieraków Landscape Park
- Warta Landscape Park
- Żerków-Czeszewo Landscape Park

== Sights ==
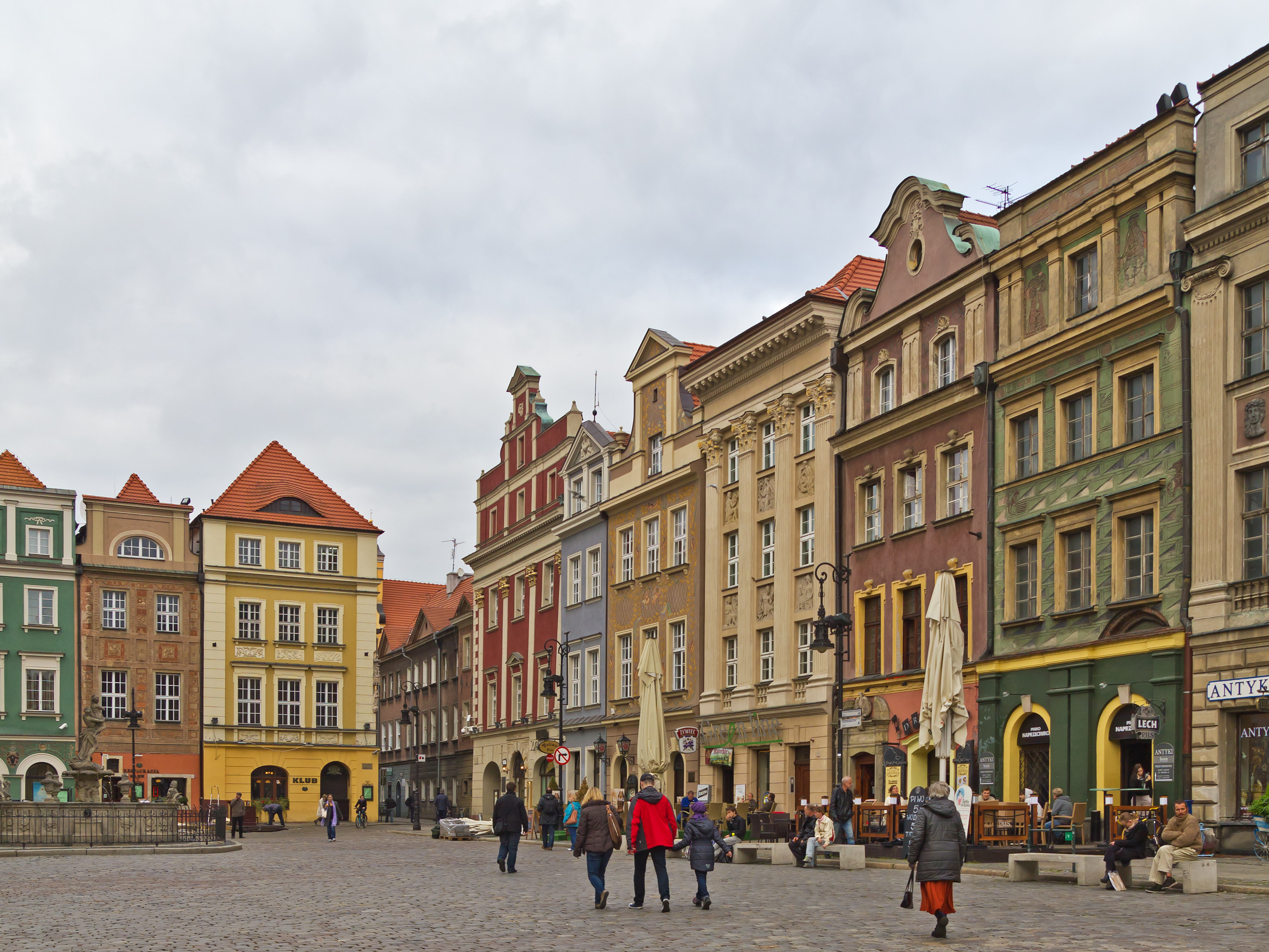
Poznań Old Town

Greater Poland Voivodeship boasts 11 Historic Monuments of Poland:

- Gorzeński Palace and park complex in Dobrzyca
- Renaissance Basilica on the Holy Mountain, Głogówko
- Royal Gniezno Cathedral
- Manor and park complex in Koszuty
- Kórnik Castle and park complex with the All Saints' Church in Kórnik
- Ląd Abbey
- Benedictine Monastery with the Romanesque-Gothic-Baroque Church of the Nativity of the Virgin Mary in Lubiń
- Ostrów Lednicki
- Poznań Old Town with the Ostrów Tumski, and the adjacent Park Cytadela and Fort Winiary
- Baroque Raczyński Palace and park complex in Rogalin
- Rydzyna Old Town with the Baroque Rydzyna Castle

The province is rich in historic architecture ranging from Romanesque and Gothic to Renaissance, Baroque and Art Nouveau. Numerous towns possess preserved historic market squares and town halls. The voivodeship is abundant in palaces, including in Antonin (often visited by Fryderyk Chopin), Czempiń, Kobylniki, Kołaczkowo (former home of Nobel Prize–winning novelist Władysław Reymont), Objezierze (visited by writers Adam Mickiewicz and Józef Ignacy Kraszewski) and Śmiełów (former place of stay of Adam Mickiewicz).

There are numerous World War II memorials in the province, including memorials at the sites of Nazi massacres of Poles, and museums at the sites of the former Chełmno extermination camp, Fort VII concentration camp in Poznań, and prison camp in Luboń. The Władysław Golus Regional Museum in Ostrzeszów, a town which was the location of the main German-operated prisoner of war camp for Norwegian POWs in occupied Poland during the war, hosts an exhibition devoted to the history of the Norwegian POWs.

Poland's largest church, the Basilica of Our Lady of Licheń, is located in the voivodeship.

There is an underground touristic route in the Kłodawa Salt Mine, considered the world's deepest underground tourist route.

One of the two principal and five total cemeteries of the Commonwealth War Graves Commission in Poland is located in Poznań, with more than 400 burials from both world wars.

The oldest preserved European signpost beyond the boundaries of the former Roman Empire is located in Konin.

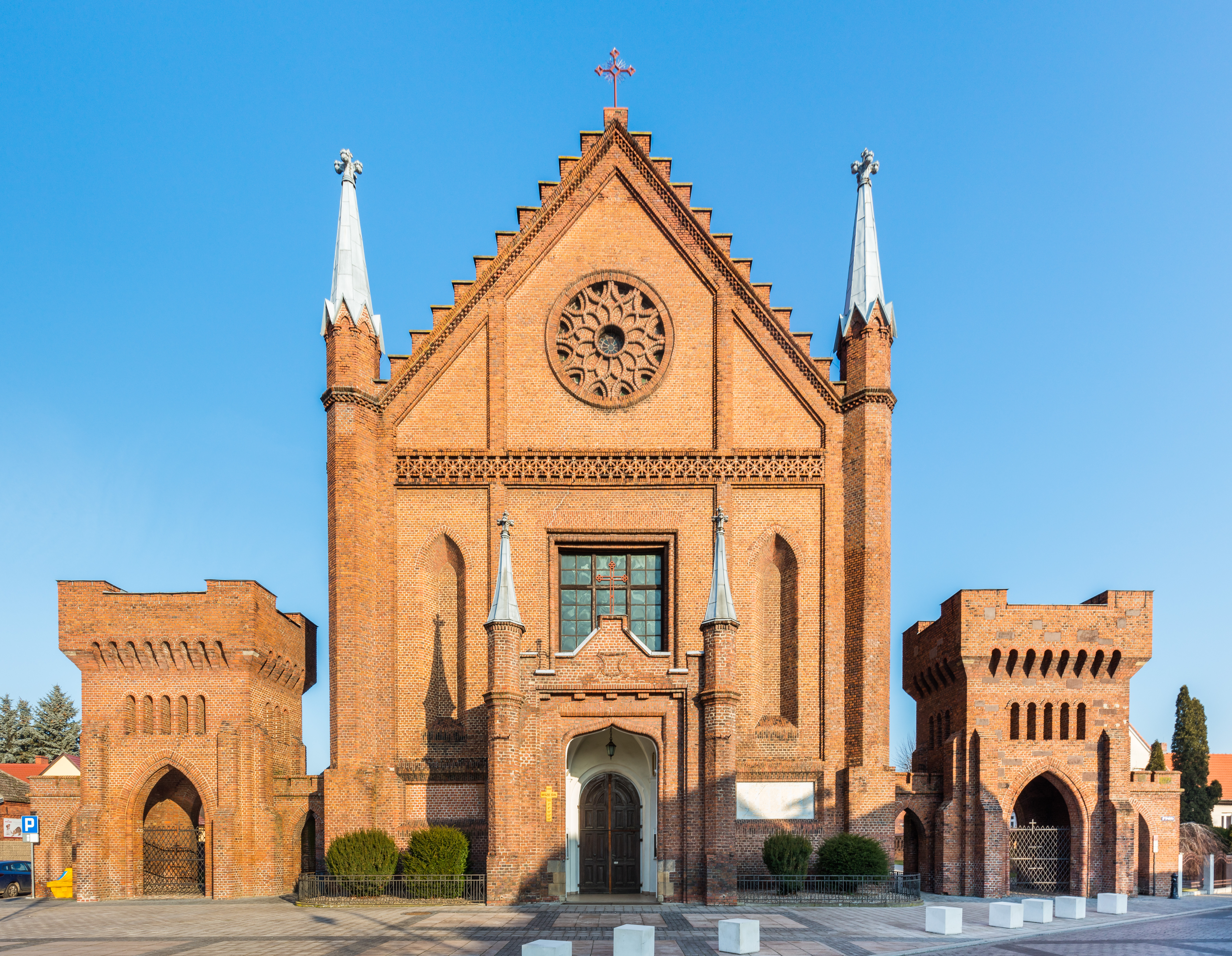
All Saints' Church, Kórnik

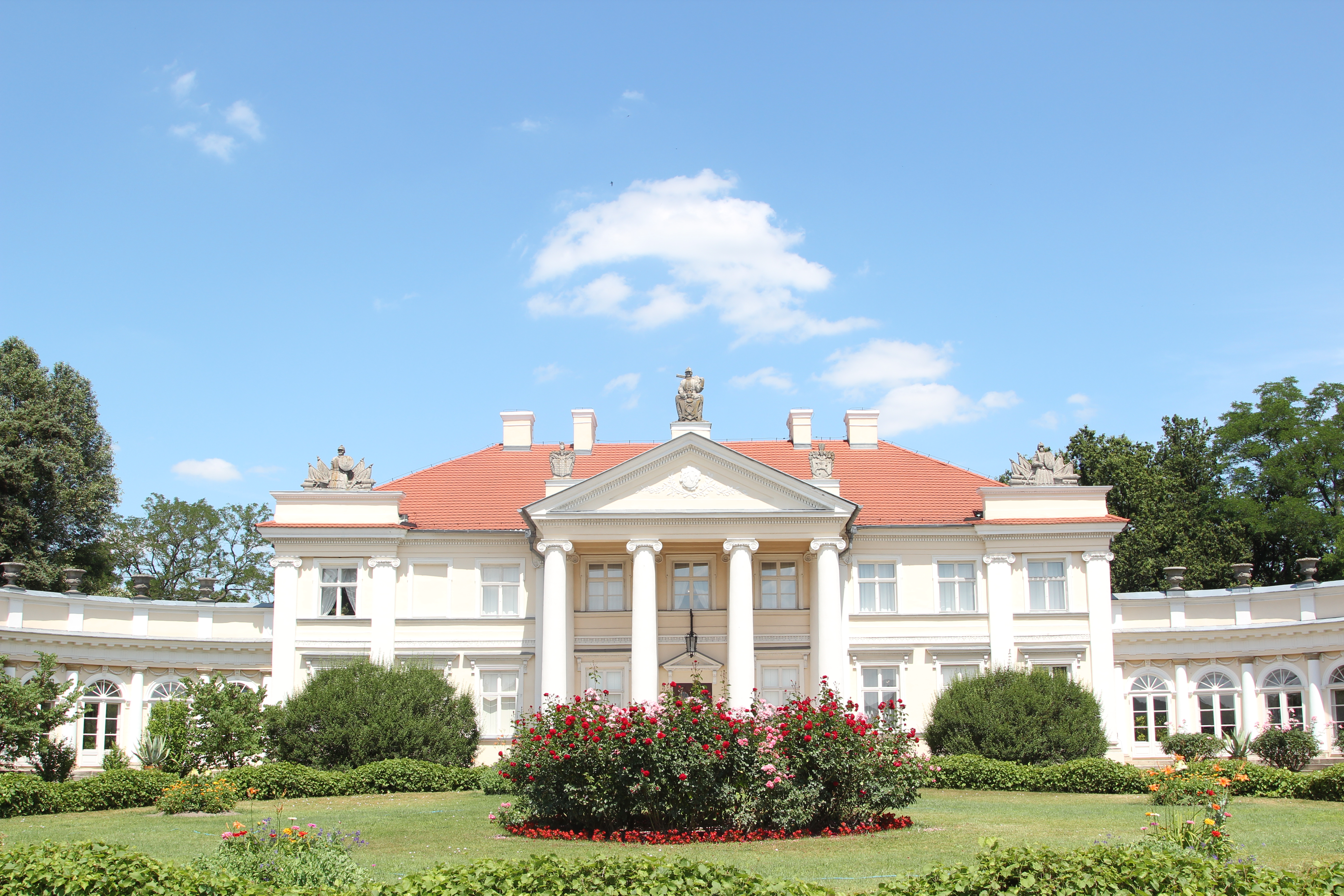
Palace in Śmiełów

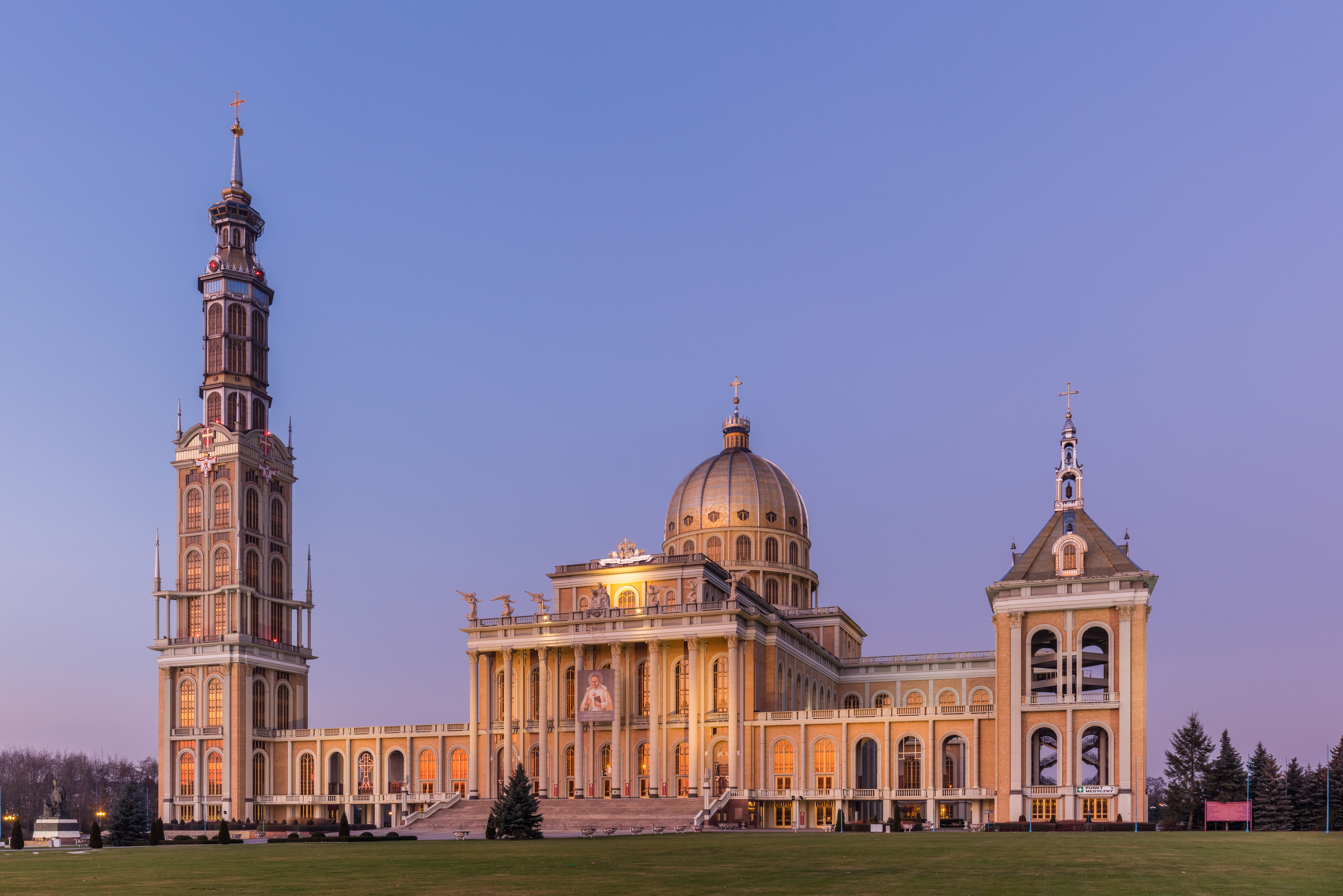
Basilica of Our Lady of Licheń

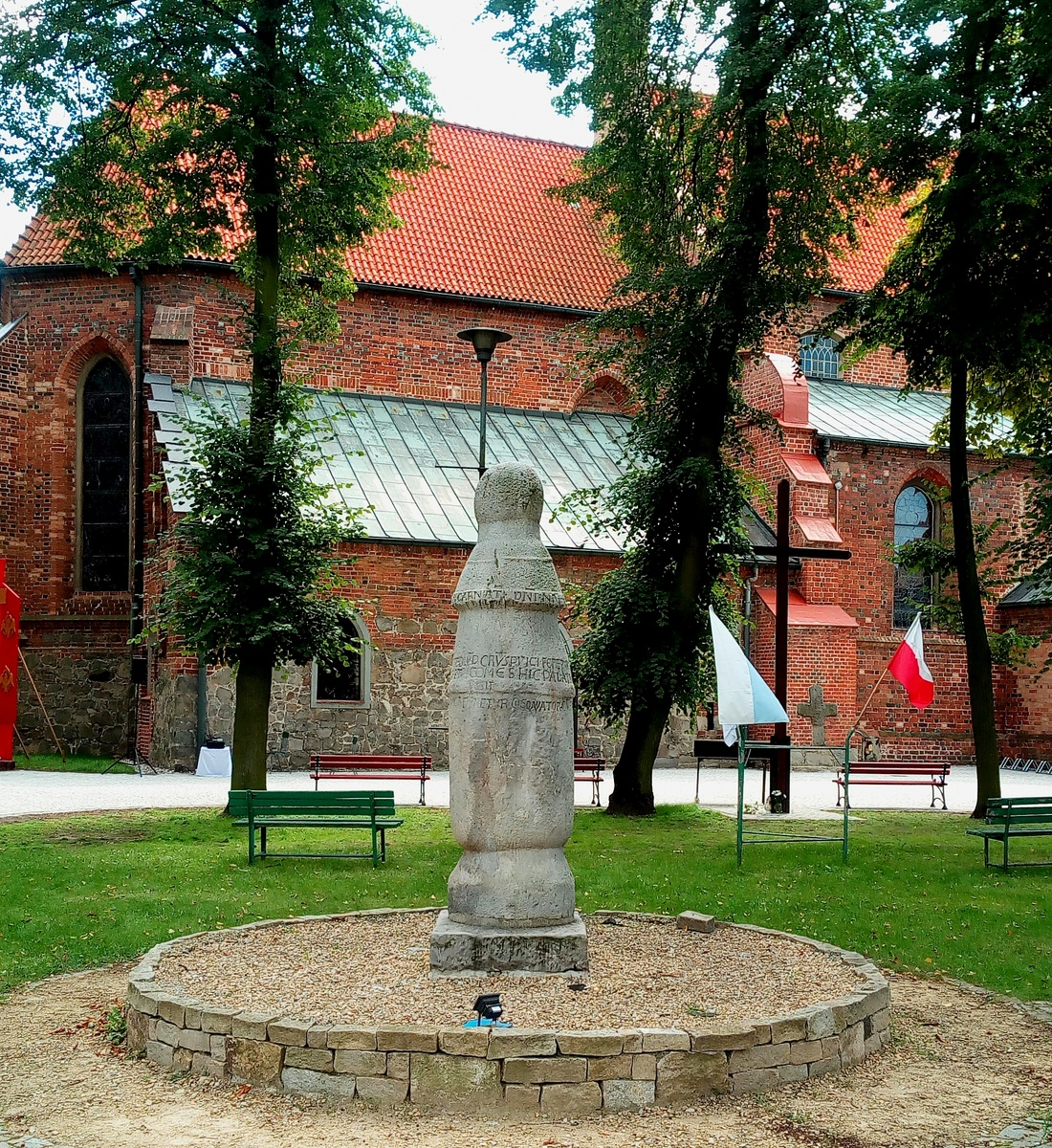
Old signpost in Konin

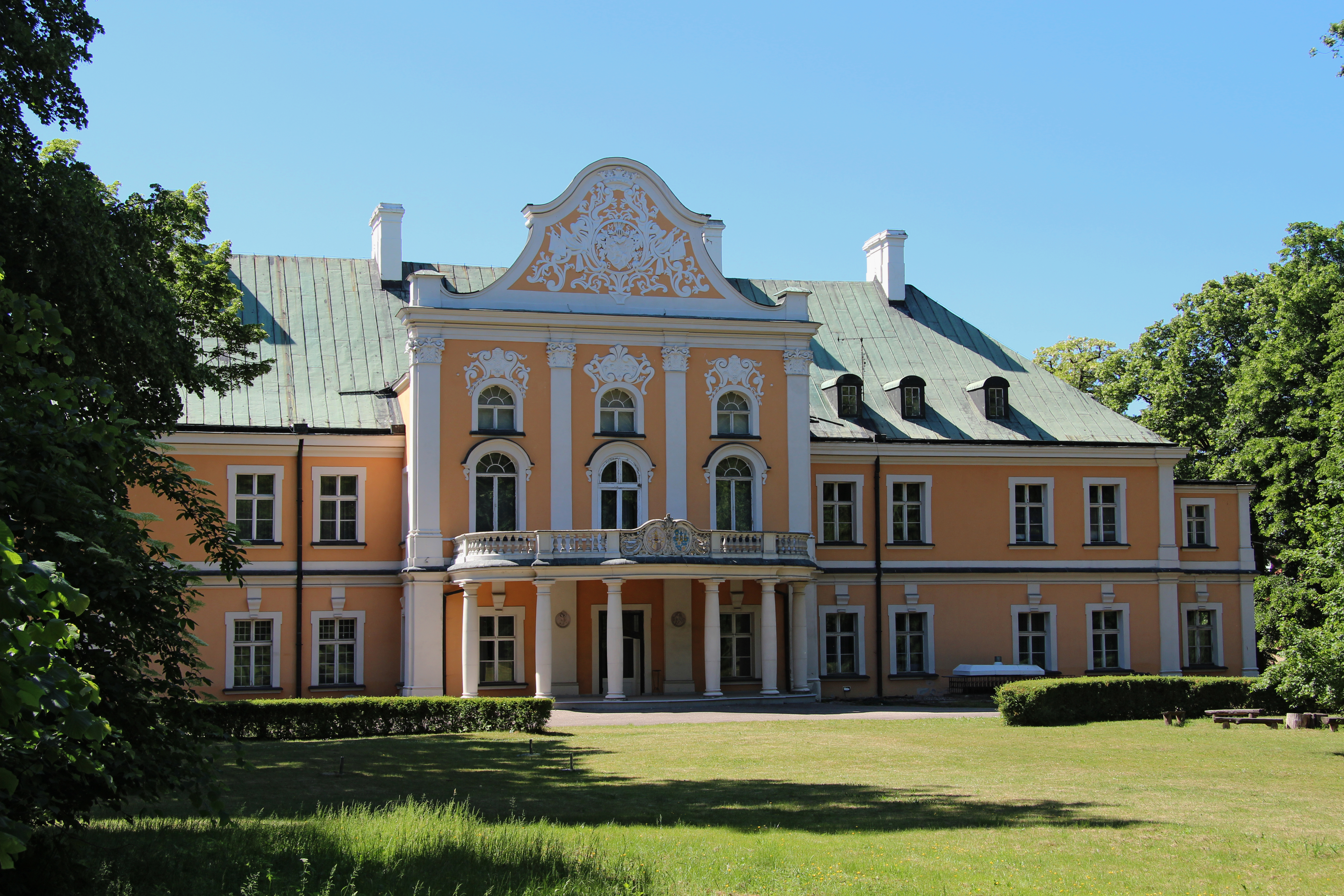
Szołdrski Palace in Czempiń

== Cuisine ==
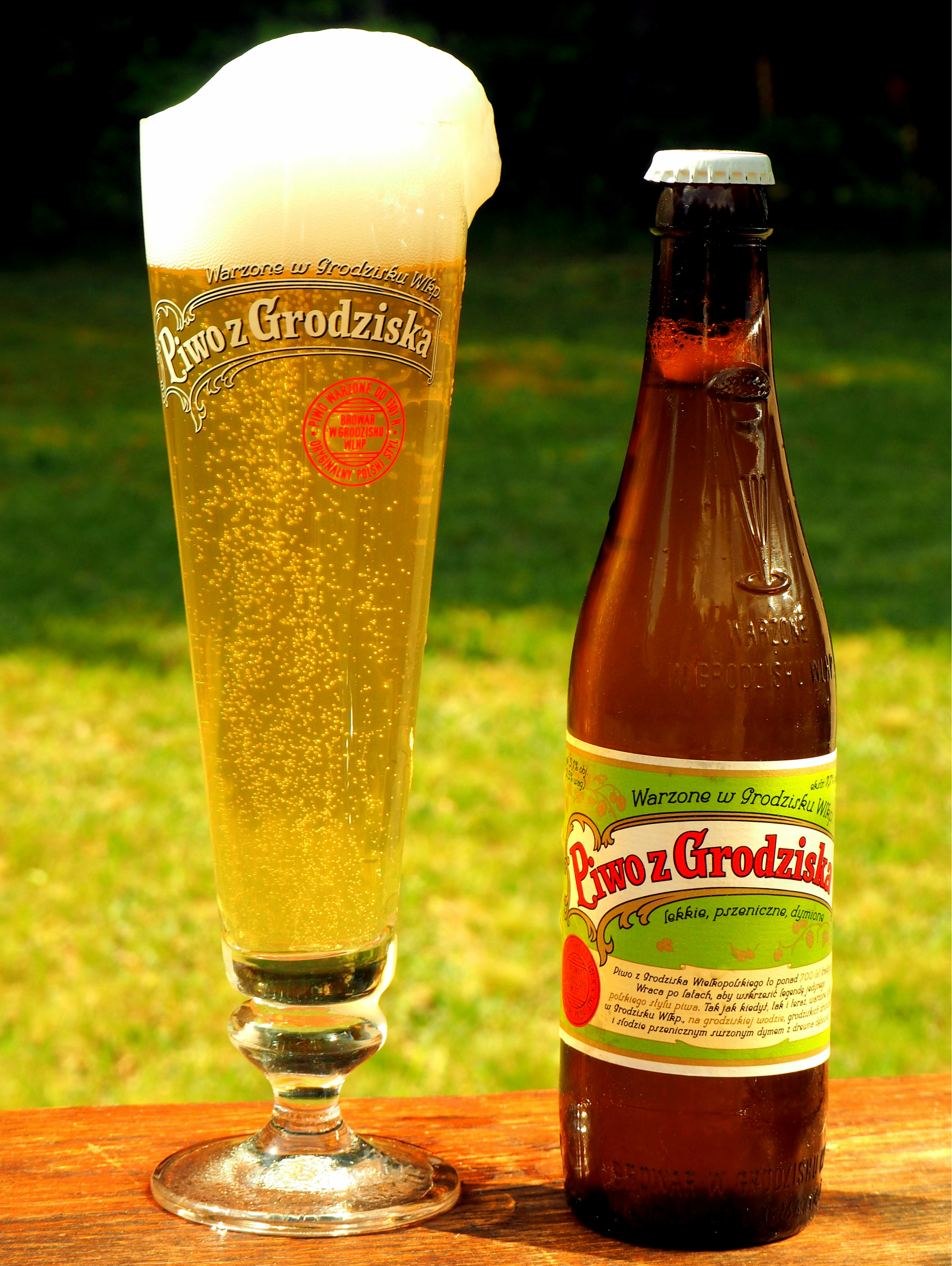
Grodziskie beer from Grodzisk Wielkopolski

In addition to traditional nationwide Polish cuisine, Greater Poland Voivodeship is known for its variety of regional and local traditional foods and drinks, which include especially various meat products (incl. various types of kiełbasa), cheeses, honeys, beverages and various dishes and meals, officially protected by the Ministry of Agriculture and Rural Development of Poland. Among the most known local snacks are the St. Martin's croissant from Poznań and Kalisz andruts.

Notable centers of traditional meat production include Grodzisk Wielkopolski, Krotoszyn, Kruszewnia, Nowy Tomyśl, Ostrzeszów, Rawicz, Trzcianka and Złotniki, whereas centers of traditional cheese and quark production include Wągrowiec, Gniezno, Kępno, Oborniki, Witkowo, Witoldzin and Września.

Grodzisk Wielkopolski is the place of origin of the Grodziskie beer style. Other traditional Polish beers, officially protected by the Ministry of Agriculture and Rural Development of Poland, are produced in Bojanowo, Czarnków and Miłosław.

== Sports ==
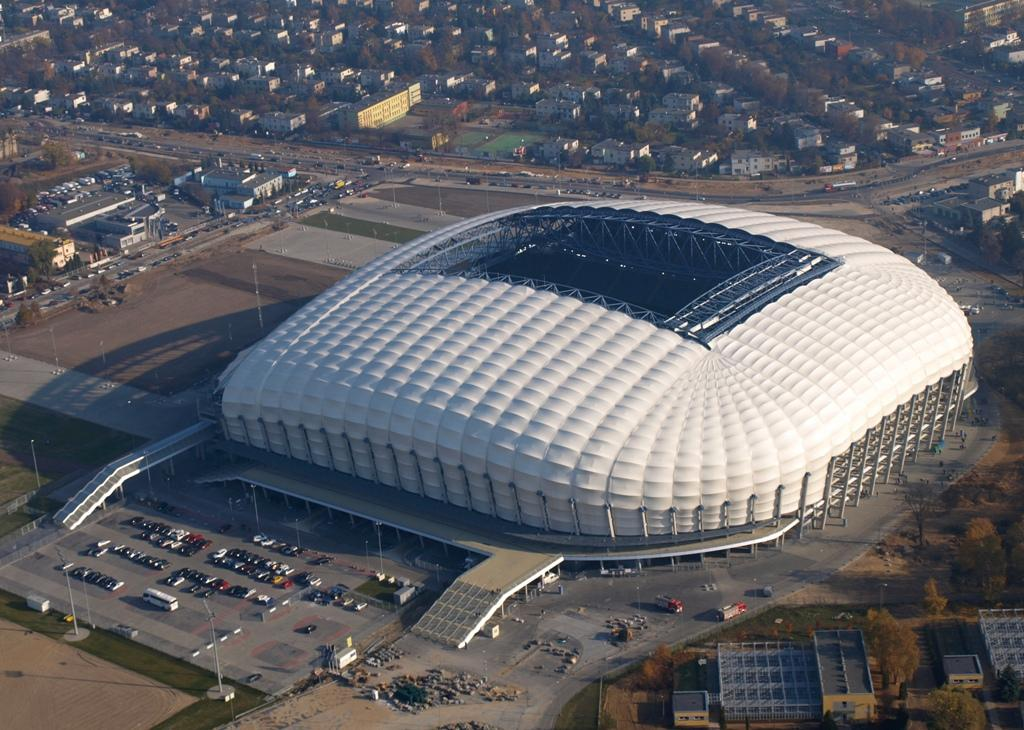
Poznań Stadium, one of the arenas of the UEFA Euro 2012 and home venue of the Lech Poznań football team

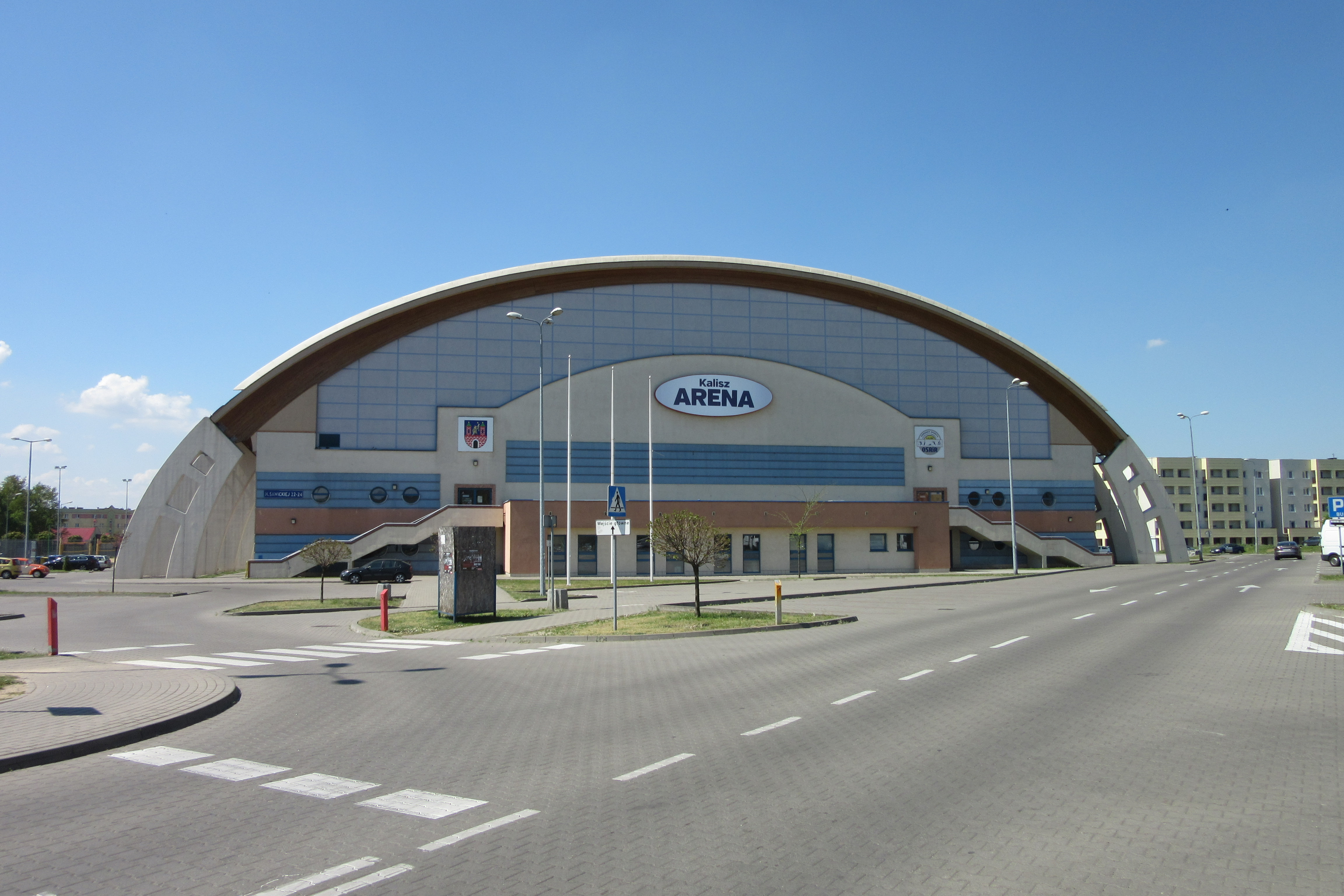
Arena Kalisz, home venue of the MKS Kalisz handball and volleyball teams

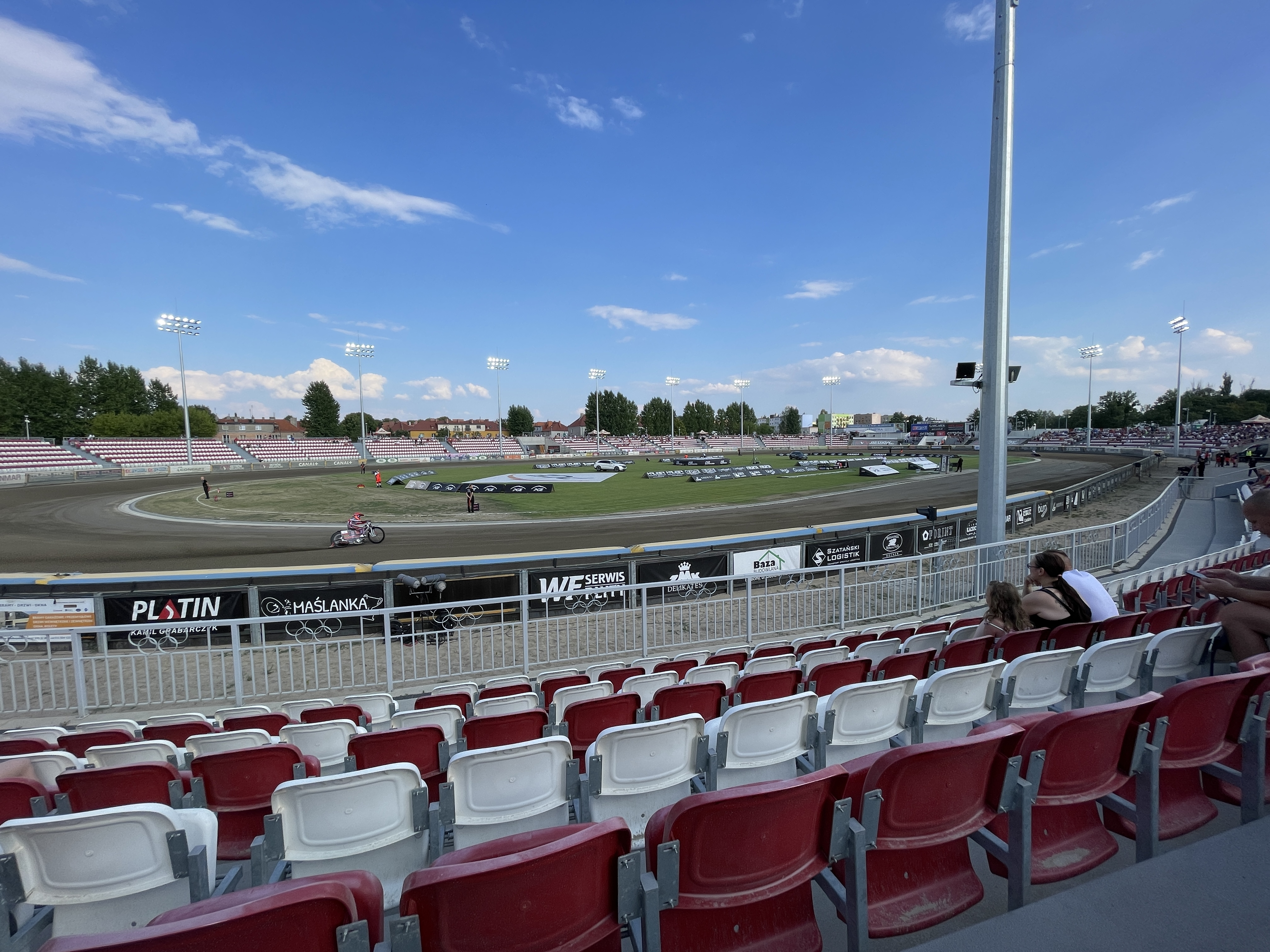
Municipal Stadium, home venue of TZ Ostrovia Ostrów Wielkopolski speedway team

Football and speedway enjoy the largest following in the province, with top football clubs being Lech Poznań and Warta Poznań, and Poland's most accomplished speedway team being Unia Leszno.

Professional sports teams
Club	Sport	League	Trophies
Lech Poznań	Football (men's)	Ekstraklasa	10 Polish Championships; 5 Polish Cups
Warta Poznań	Football (men's)	I liga	2 Polish Championships (1929, 1947)
Sokół Kleczew	Football (men's)	II liga	0
Medyk Konin	Football (women's)	Ekstraliga	4 Polish Championships; 9 Polish Cups
Lech Poznań	Football (women's)	I liga	0
Unia Leszno	Speedway	Ekstraliga	18 Polish Championships
TZ Ostrovia Ostrów Wielkopolski	Speedway	1. Liga	0
PSŻ Poznań	Speedway	1. Liga	0
Polonia Piła	Speedway	2. Liga	1 Polish Championship (1999)
Start Gniezno	Speedway	2. Liga	0
Stal Ostrów Wielkopolski	Basketball (men's)	Polish Basketball League	1 Polish Championship (2021); 2 Polish Cups (2019, 2022)
AZS Poznań	Basketball (women's)	Basket Liga Kobiet	1 Polish Championship (1978)
MKS Kalisz	Handball (men's)	Polish Superliga	0
KPR Ostrovia Ostrów Wielkopolski	Handball (men's)	Polish Superliga	0
MKS Gniezno	Handball (women's)	Polish Superliga	0
Ruch Szczypiorno Kalisz	Handball (women's)	Liga Centralna Kobiet	0
MKS Kalisz	Volleyball (women's)	Tauron Liga	4 Polish Championships; 4 Polish Cups
Futsal Leszno	Futsal (men's)	Ekstraklasa	0
Red Dragons Pniewy	Futsal (men's)	Ekstraklasa	0

Since the establishment of the province, several international sports competitions were co-hosted by the province, including the EuroBasket 2009 and UEFA Euro 2012.

Szczypiorno, Kalisz is considered the cradle of Polish handball.

== Curiosities ==
- In the 16th–17th centuries, there were sizeable Scottish communities in Poznań and Łobżenica, and smaller ones in Borek Wielkopolski, Gostyń, Skoki and Szamotuły.

== See also ==
- Prussia's Province of Posen (1818–1919)
- Second Polish Republic's Poznań Voivodeship (1921–1939)
