= All Saints' Church, Kórnik =

Coordinates: 52.1449°N 17.0527°E

All Saints' Church
- Kościół Wszystkich Świętych w Kórniku
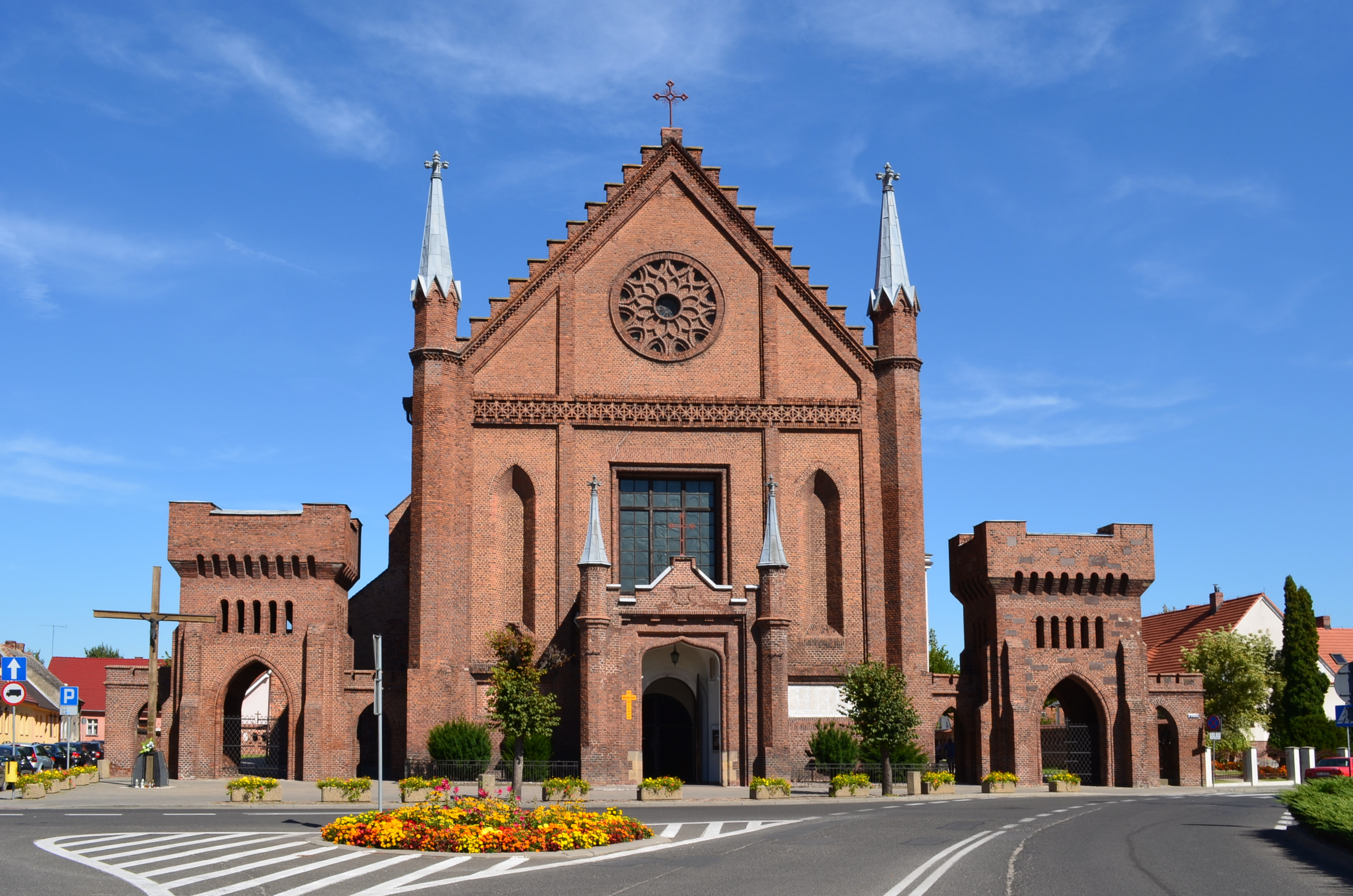
- All Saints' Church
- All Saints' Church
- Location: Kórnik
- Country: Poland
- Denomination: Roman Catholic

Architecture
- Style: Gothic
- Completed: 1437

Administration
- Archdiocese: Roman Catholic Archdiocese of Poznań

Historic Monument of Poland
- Designated: 2011-06-15
- Part of: Kórnik – castle and park complex with the parish church, owners' necropolis
- Reference no.: Dz. U. z 2011 r. Nr 143, poz. 836

All Saints' Church in Kórnik, Poland, is a historic Gothic church. The church located south of Poznań and is part of the Roman Catholic Archdiocese of that city. On July 11, 2011 the site was enlisted on the List of Historic Monuments of Poland.

The church was raised in 1437, by Łukasz I Górka of the Łodzia coat of arms, then part of the Kościan Starostwo. In the sixteenth century, the site was temporarily transformed into a Lutheran place of worship by Łukasz III Górka.
