= Agata Sobczyk =

Polish economist and politician (born 1988)

Voivode of Greater Poland Voivodeship
- Incumbent
- Assumed office 28 December 2023
- Preceded by: Michał Zieliński

Personal details
- Born: 8 August 1988 (age 38) Gostyń, Poland
- Citizenship: Poland
- Party: Poland 2050
- Education: Poznań University of Economics and Business
- Occupation: Economist; Politician

Agata Sobczyk (Polish: [ˈa.ɡa.ta ˈsɔp.t͡ʂɘ̟k]; born 8 August 1988) is a Polish economist and politician. Since 2023, she has served as the voivode of Greater Poland Voivodeship in Poland. She is a member of the Poland 2050 political party.

== Biography ==
Agata Sobczyk was born on 8 August 1988 in the town of Gostyń, Poland, and grew up in the village of Skórzewo in Greater Poland Voivodeship. She graduated from the Poznań University of Economics and Business with a licentiate in business management, and later with a master's degree in international business. She also studied management at the City Institute in Sydney, Australia. She worked in the Polish diplomatic institutions in Sydney and Dublin, Ireland.

Sobczyk was involved in the presidential campaign of Szymon Hołownia during the 2020 election, and joined the Poland 2050 party, becoming the leader of its division in the city of Poznań. During the 2023 parliamentary election, she unsuccessfully ran to the Sejm of Poland, receiving 6,117 votes (1.03%). She was a candidate of the Third Way political alliance, within the constituency no. 39, which consists of the city of Poznań, and surrounding it Poznań County. On 28 December 2023, she was appointed as the voivode of Greater Poland Voivodeship, replacing Michał Zieliński.

== Personal life ==
Sobczyk has a husband and two children. She lives in Poznań, Poland.

== Electoral history ==
Electoral history of Agata Sobczyk
Year	Office		Party	Constituency	Votes			Result	Ref.
Year	Office		Party	Constituency	Total	%	P.	Result	Ref.
2023	Sejm of Poland	10th	Third Way	No. 39	6,117	1.03%	18th	Lost	
