= Greater Poland Voivodeship Sejmik =

Greater Poland Voivodeship Sejmik Sejmik Województwa Wielkopolskiego

Type
- Type: Unicameral

Leadership
- Chairperson: Tatiana Sokołowska, KO
- Vice-Chairpersons: Henryk Drzewiecki (PO), Agnieszka Wisniewska (Polska 2050), Marek Sowa (PiS).
- Marshal: Marek Woźniak, KO

Structure
- Seats: 39 councillors
- Political groups: Executive board (24): KO (15); PO (15); PSL (4); P2050 (3); L (2); NL (2); Opposition parties (15): PiS (12); PiS (12); R+ (3)

Elections
- Last election: 7 April 2024

Meeting place
- Marshal's Office, Poznań

Website
- Greater Poland Regional Assembly

The Greater Poland Voivodeship Sejmik (Polish: Sejmik Województwa Wielkopolskiego) is the regional legislature of the Voivodeship of Greater Poland. It is a unicameral parliamentary body consisting of thirty-nine councillors elected to a five-year term. The current chairperson of the assembly is Tatiana Sokołowska.

The assembly elects the executive board that acts as the collective executive for the regional government, headed by the province's marshal. The current Executive Board of Greater Poland is a coalition government between Civic Coalition, Third Way and The Left with Marek Woźniak of Civic Coalition presiding as marshal.

The assembly meets in the Marshal's Office in Poznań.

== Districts ==
Members of the Assembly are elected from six districts, serve five-year terms. Districts does not have the constituencies formal names. Instead, each constituency has a number, territorial description.

Number	Seats	City counties	Land counties
1	6	Poznań	None
2	7	None	Chodzież, Czarnków-Trzcianka, Międzychód, Oborniki, Piła, Szamotuły, Wągrowiec, Złotów
3	7	None	Poznań, Śrem, Środa, Gniezno, Września
4	5	Konin	Konin, Koło, Słupca, Turek
5	7	Kalisz	Kępno, Kalisz, Ostrów, Ostrzeszów, Jarocin, Pleszew
6	7	Leszno	Leszno, Gostyń, Grodzisk, Kościan, Krotoszyn, Nowy Tomyśl, Rawicz, Wolsztyn

== Composition ==
=== 1998 ===
Party	Mandates
Sojusz Lewicy Demokratycznej	29
Akcja Wyborcza Solidarność	21
Unia Wolności	5
Przymierze Społeczne	5
Total	60

=== 2002 ===
Party	Mandates
Sojusz Lewicy Demokratycznej – Unia Pracy	13
Platforma Obywatelska – Prawo i Sprawiedliwość	8
Samoobrona Rzeczpospolitej Polskiej	7
Liga Polskich Rodzin	6
Polskie Stronnictwo Ludowe	5
Total	39

=== 2006 ===
Party	Mandates
Platforma Obywatelska	15
Prawo i Sprawiedliwość	12
Lewica i Demokraci	7
Polskie Stronnictwo Ludowe	5
Total	39

=== 2010 ===
Party	Mandates
Platforma Obywatelska	17
Sojusz Lewicy Demokratycznej	9
Polskie Stronnictwo Ludowe	7
Prawo i Sprawiedliwość	6
Total	39

=== 2014 ===
Party	Mandates
Platforma Obywatelska	13
Polskie Stronnictwo Ludowe	12
Prawo i Sprawiedliwość	8
SLD Lewica Razem	4
Teraz Wielkopolska	2
Total	39

=== 2018 ===
Party	Mandates
Koalicja Obywatelska	15
Prawo i Sprawiedliwość	13
Polskie Stronnictwo Ludowe	7
SLD Lewica Razem	3
Independent	1
Total	39

=== 2024 ===
Party	Mandates
Koalicja Obywatelska	15
Prawo i Sprawiedliwość	15
Trzecia Droga	7
Lewica	2
Total	39

== Charts ==
1998

2006

2010

2014

2018

== See also ==
- Polish Regional Assembly
- Greater Poland Voivodeship
