= Maria Roszak =

Polish nun and supercentenarian

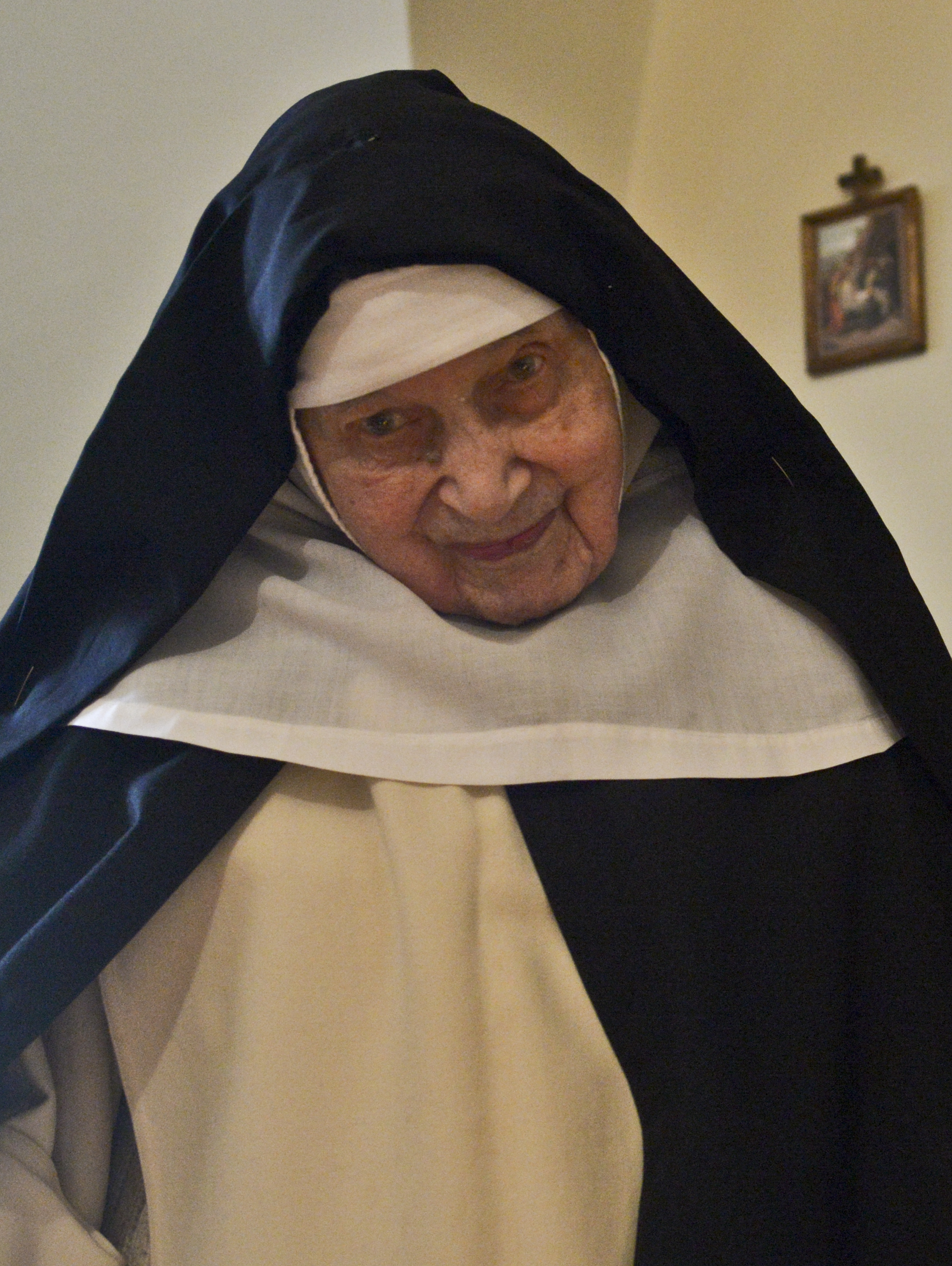
- Roszak in 2015

Personal life
- Born: 25 March 1908 Kiełczewo, Gmina Kościan, Poland
- Died: 16 November 2018 (aged 110) Kraków, Poland

Religious life
- Religion: Roman Catholic
- Order: Dominican
- Monastic name: Cecylia

Sister Cecylia Roszak (born Maria Roszak; 25 March 1908 – 16 November 2018) was a Polish nun, Dominican sister, Righteous Among the Nations, and supercentenarian.

== Biography ==
Sister Cecylia was born on 25 March 1908 as Maria Roszak in the town of Kiełczewo, German Empire, now in Kościan County, Greater Poland Voivodeship, Poland. Roszak graduated from the State Trade and Industrial School of Women in Poznań. At age 21, she joined the convent of Dominican cloisters in Kraków, Church of Mary of Snow in Kraków. On 7 February 1931 she made her first religious vows, taking the name of Cecylia, and she took her final vows in 1934. In 1938, she went to Vilnius to establish a new monastery with a group of Dominicans in Kolonia Wileńska. The sisters worked on a five-hectare (12-acre) farm, away from the city. They lived in a wooden house with a small chapel.

During the World War II occupation in Vilnius, with other nuns, she helped many refugees. The nuns also sheltered fifteen Jewish refugees from the Vilna Ghetto from the youth scouting group Hashomer Hatzair including Abba Kovner, Izrael Chaim Wilner, Haika Grossman, Elye Boraks, Chuma Godot, and Izrael Nagel. The nuns' monastery became a base of the local Jewish resistance, where the Jewish resistance organization Fareynikte Partizaner Organizatsye was formed. In 1943, the Germans arrested the mother superior and closed the monastery, but the nuns, though deprived of their main base, continued their activities. In 1944, Sister Cecylia became a prioress. That year she also took in two children whose parents were murdered during the war. After the war, due to the borders' change and the loss of Vilnius by Poland, she returned to Kraków.

She had many functions in the Dominican convent in Kraków. She was a porter, organist, and cantor—she taught and initiated choral singing. She was also a prioress of the monastery several times. She learned foreign languages and took care of the monastery correspondence. In recognition of her merits, she was awarded the title of "Righteous Among the Nations" in March 1984, at age 76. On 25 March 2018 she celebrated her 110th birthday, and was called "the oldest living Cracovian" (inhabitant of the city of Kraków).

Maria Roszak died in Kraków on 16 November 2018.
