= Oborzyska =

Oborzyska can refer to:

- Nowe Oborzyska
- Stare Oborzyska
