= Chłapowski Landscape Park =

Protected area in Poland

Gen. Dezydery Chłapowski Landscape Park
- Park Krajobrazowy im. gen. Dezyderego Chłapowskiego
- IUCN category V (protected landscape/seascape)
- Location within Greater Poland Voivodeship Location within Poland
- Location: Greater Poland Voivodeship
- Coordinates: 52.05694°N 16.80889°E
- Area: 172 km^{2} (66 sq mi)
- Established: 1992

General Dezydery Chłapowski Landscape Park (Park Krajobrazowy im. gen. Dezyderego Chłapowskiego) is a protected area (Landscape Park) in west-central Poland, established in 1992, covering an area of 173.2 square kilometres (66.9 sq mi). It is named after the 19th-century Polish general and activist Dezydery Chłapowski.

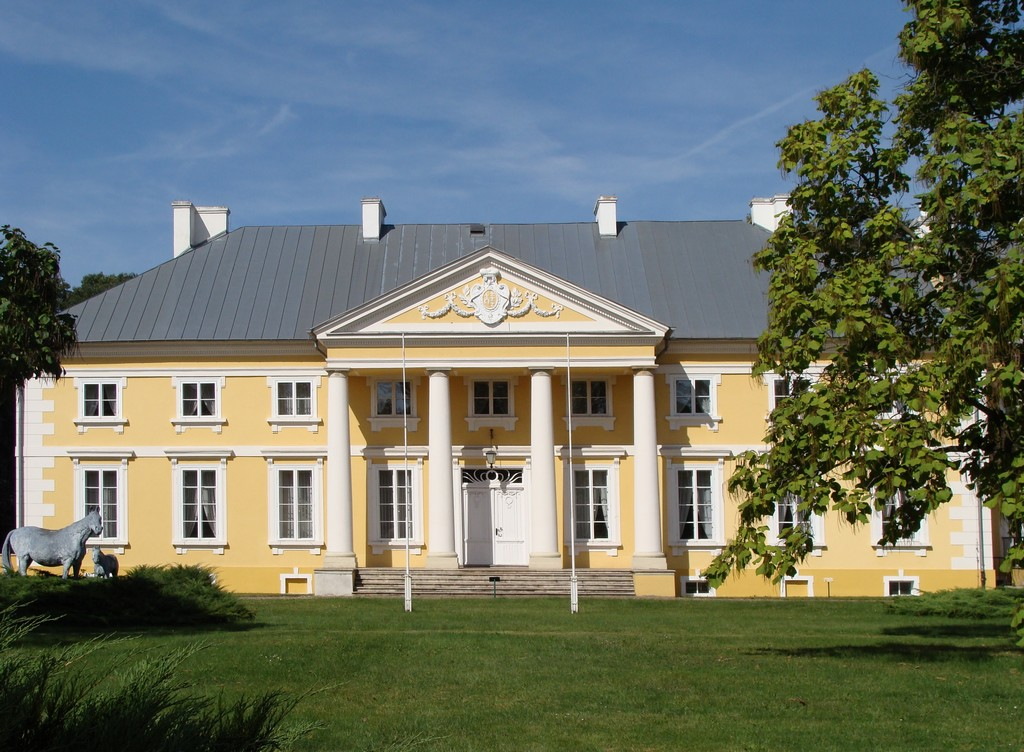
Racot, Jabłonowski palace

The Park lies within Greater Poland Voivodeship: in Kościan County (Gmina Czempiń, Gmina Kościan, Gmina Krzywiń) and Śrem County (Gmina Śrem).
