= Adam Poniński =

Adam Poniński may refer to:

- Adam Poniński (1732-1798), Marshal of the Sejm, Deputy Crown Treasurer
- Adam Poniński (1758-1816), prince, general, deputy
