= Rettig =

Rettig (nickname of the greengrocer or radish farmer or for a person who likes radish or who has a radish-like shape) is a German surname. Notable people with the surname include:

- Alvin Rettig (born 1963), American arena football player
- Charles P. Rettig (born 1956), American attorney and Commissioner of Internal Revenue
- Chase Rettig (born 1991), American football player
- Haviv Rettig Gur (born 1981), Israeli journalist and commentator
- James R. Rettig (1950–2022), American librarian
- Otto Rettig (1894–1977), American baseball player
- Raúl Rettig (1909–2000), Chilean politician and lawyer
- Tommy Rettig (1941–1996), American child actor, computer software engineer and author

== Fictional characters ==
- Lancer Rettig, fictional character in the novel Endymion by Dan Simmons

== See also ==
- 8474 Rettig, main-belt asteroid
- Rettig Report, 1991 report on human rights abuses in Chile under Augusto Pinochet
- Krzan, Poland (German: Rettig), a village in Greater Poland
- Rettig ICC, manufacturer of heating systems
- Rettich, similar etymology
