= Nowa Wieś, Kościan County =

Nowa Wieś
- Village
- Location within Poland
- Coordinates: 52°1′41″N 16°30′2″E
- Country: Poland
- Voivodeship: Greater Poland
- County: Kościan
- Gmina: Śmigiel
- Population: 170

Nowa Wieś [ˈnɔva ˈvjɛɕ] is a village in the administrative district of Gmina Śmigiel, within Kościan County, Greater Poland Voivodeship, in west-central Poland.
