= Wławie =

- Village
- Location within Poland
- Coordinates: 52°0′41″N 16°45′31″E
- Country: Poland
- Voivodeship: Greater Poland
- County: Kościan
- Gmina: Kościan
- Population: 125

Wławie [ˈvwavjɛ] is a village in the administrative district of Gmina Kościan, within Kościan County, Greater Poland Voivodeship, in west-central Poland.
