= Nowy Dębiec =

- Village
- Location within Poland
- Coordinates: 52°0′0″N 16°43′11″E
- Country: Poland
- Voivodeship: Greater Poland
- County: Kościan
- Gmina: Kościan
- Population: 164

Nowy Dębiec [ˈnɔvɨ ˈdɛmbjɛt͡s] is a village in the administrative district of Gmina Kościan, within Kościan County, Greater Poland Voivodeship, in west-central Poland.
