= Bruszczewo =

- Village
- Location within Poland
- Coordinates: 52°1′N 16°35′E
- Country: Poland
- Voivodeship: Greater Poland
- County: Kościan
- Gmina: Śmigiel

Bruszczewo [bruʂˈt͡ʂɛvɔ] is a village in the administrative district of Gmina Śmigiel, within Kościan County, Greater Poland Voivodeship, in west-central Poland.

== History ==
Bruszczewo has a fortified settlement from the Unetice culture dating to 2300-1800 BCE, with gold processing and forging.
