= Machcin, Greater Poland Voivodeship =

Machcin
- Village
- Location within Poland
- Coordinates: 51°57′N 16°26′E
- Country: Poland
- Voivodeship: Greater Poland
- County: Kościan
- Gmina: Śmigiel

Machcin [ˈmaxt͡ɕin] is a village in the administrative district of Gmina Śmigiel, within Kościan County, Greater Poland Voivodeship, in west-central Poland.
