= Artur Hojan =

- Artur Hojan, selfportrait
- Born: 7 August 1973; Głogów, Poland
- Disappeared: 1 December 2013; Kościan, west-central Poland
- Status: Deceased
- Occupation: Investigative journalist

Artur Hojan (7 August 1973 – found dead, 9 February 2014) was a journalist and published author specializing in the history of the Chełmno extermination camp and the Nazi involuntary euthanasia programme conducted in the territory of occupied Poland by the SS during World War II. Hojan was the co-founder of the Tiergartenstrasse4 Association in 2005 (together with Cameron Munro) devoted to Aktion T4 history, with emphasis on the Kościan psychiatric hospital located where he lived. Hojan, age of 40, left home in the evening of 1 December 2013 at 8 p.m. for a walk around town and disappeared. His body was found two months later on 9 February 2014 floating in the Obra canal near the town of Kiełczewo, and identified later. The cause of death has not been determined. He was buried at the Kościan cemetery on 15 February 2014. He left behind a wife and young daughter. The monograph Treblinka Death Camp: History, Biographies, Remembrance by Chris Webb, the co-founder of H.E.A.R.T (also known as the HolocaustResearchProject.org), is dedicated to his memory.

== Life ==
Hojan was born in Głogów, Lower Silesia, and lived in Kościan (69 km distance). He graduated from the Poznań University department of Geology. After graduation, Hojan worked as a journalist, and in the course of his research, became interested in the war crimes committed in occupied Poland during World War II. In 2002 Hojan published Terra Incognita, his first expanded essay about the history of a Jewish community from a small-town in Wielkopolska, Poland. His book was adapted for the stage in the same year by Teatr 112 of the Kościan Community Centre. In 2004, Hojan published a monograph about the extermination of Polish hospital patients by the SS, titled Nazistowska pseudoeutanazja w Krajowym Zakładzie Psychiatrycznym w Kościanie (1939-1940) or The Nazi pseudo-euthanasia at the Psychiatric Hospital in Kościan (1939-1940) about the forced euthanasia in the newly-formed Warthegau district, which led to the murder of 3,282 patients of the local psychiatric hospital in his hometown between November 1939 and March 1940.

In 2005 Hojan co-founded the Tiergartenstrasse4 Association with British researcher Cameron Munro, to further research and document the subject of Nazi euthanasia leading to the Holocaust. He was instrumental in creating the Associations website. He worked closely with the Auschwitz-Birkenau State Museum, researching and photographing Auschwitz subcamps. After several years of fieldwork in December 2011 Hojan and Munro organized an exhibition on the extermination camp Kulmhof at the Centrum Judaicum in Berlin, titled "The unknown extermination camp Kulmhof am Ner – history and remembrance" documenting the development and history of the camp. The exhibition revealed that traces of murder can still be found at the site seventy years after the fact. The exhibition was sponsored by the Foundation Memorial to the Murdered Jews of Europe and funded in part by the German Federal Government.

Hojan helped organize presentations at conferences devoted to World War II and the Nazi euthanasia in Germany. He also wrote chapters for books, and articles for Polish periodicals about the Holocaust and the extermination of Jews with the use of sparsely documented gas vans. At the time of his death Hojan was working on a book about the Arbeitskommando at Kulmhof. His manuscript was saved in a draft form and is scheduled to published by the association as a "fitting memorial to Artur and his work". Following Hojan's death, the Tiergartenstrasse4 Association relocated to Berlin and re-established itself as the Tiergarten4 Association.

== Selected publications ==
- Artur Hojan, Terra incognita, Kościańska Oficyna Literacka "Werset", 2002.
- Artur Hojan, Komora gazowa w Forcie VII w Poznaniu (początek nazistowskiego ludobójstwa) [The gas chamber at Fort VII in Poznan, the beginning of Nazi genocide]
- Artur Hojan et al., Człowiek wobec totalitaryzmu. Od prostych recept do ostatecznego rozwiązania [Individual human being against totalitarianism. From basic precepts to stable solutions].
- Artur Hojan, Nazistowska pseudoeutanazja w Krajowym Zakładzie Psychiatrycznym w Kościanie (1939-1940) [The Nazi pseudo-euthanasia at the Psychiatric Hospital in Kościan (1939-1940)].
