= Cieślewicz =

Cieślewicz is a Polish surname. Notable people with this surname include:

- Adrian Cieślewicz (born 1990), Polish footballer
- Anna Borucka-Cieślewicz (born 1941), Polish politician
- Dave Cieslewicz (born 1959), American politician
- Ewa Wiśnierska née Cieślewicz (born 1971), Polish-German paraglider
- Łukasz Cieślewicz (born 1987), Polish footballer
- Roman Cieślewicz (1930–1996), Polish-French artist
