= Turew =

- Village
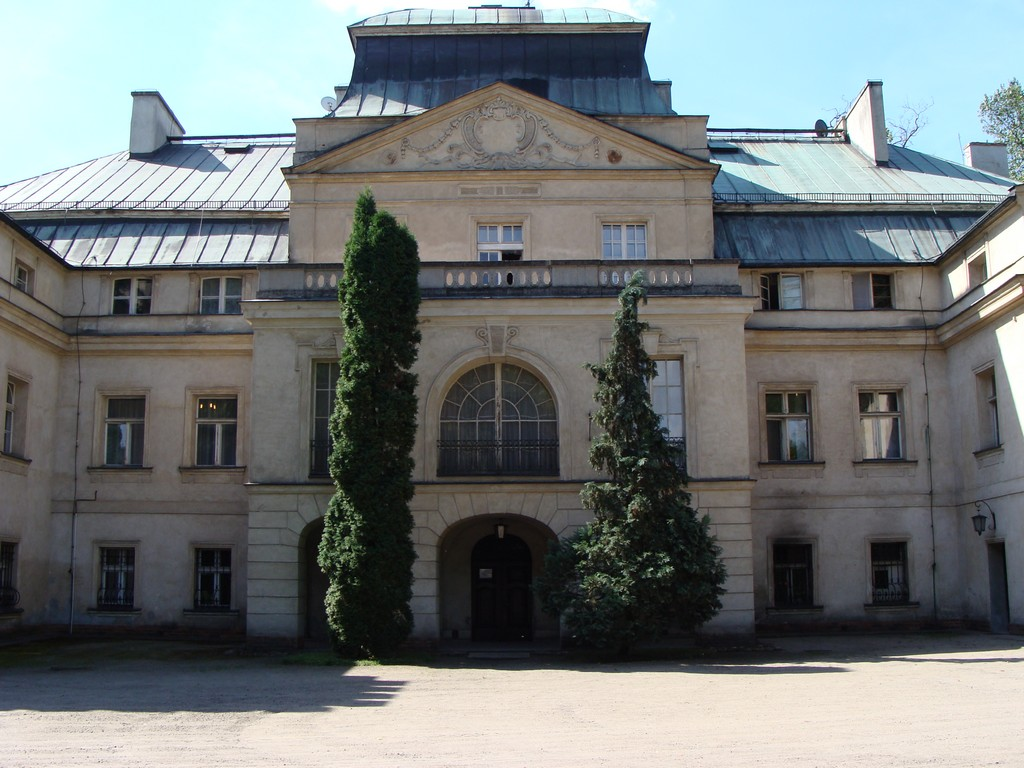

- Location within Poland
- Coordinates: 52°4′N 16°50′E
- Country: Poland
- Voivodeship: Greater Poland
- County: Kościan
- Gmina: Kościan
- Elevation: 80 m (260 ft)
- Population: 760

Turew [ˈturɛf] is a village in the administrative district of Gmina Kościan, within Kościan County, Greater Poland Voivodeship, in west-central Poland.

There is an 18th-century manor house in Turew, which until the Second World War belonged to the aristocratic Dryja-Chłapowski family. Among the most notable residents of the house was Dezydery Chłapowski, a Napoleonic officer and a baron of the then French Empire.
