= Krzan =

Krzan may refer to:

- Krzan, Poland, a village near Kościan
- Kržan, Croatian surname
