= Sikorzyn, Kościan County =

Sikorzyn
- Village
- Location within Poland
- Coordinates: 51°59′49″N 16°26′49″E
- Country: Poland
- Voivodeship: Greater Poland
- County: Kościan
- Gmina: Śmigiel

Sikorzyn [ɕiˈkɔʐɨn] is a village in the administrative district of Gmina Śmigiel, within Kościan County, Greater Poland Voivodeship, in west-central Poland.
