= Brońsko =

- Village
- Location within Poland
- Coordinates: 52°5′N 16°31′E
- Country: Poland
- Voivodeship: Greater Poland
- County: Kościan
- Gmina: Śmigiel

Brońsko [ˈbrɔɲskɔ] is a village in the administrative district of Gmina Śmigiel, within Kościan County, Greater Poland Voivodeship, in west-central Poland.
