= Spławie =

Spławie may refer to the following places:

- Spławie, part of the district of Nowe Miasto in Poznań
- Spławie, Konin County in Greater Poland Voivodeship (west-central Poland)
- Spławie, Kościan County in Greater Poland Voivodeship (west-central Poland)
- Spławie, Kuyavian-Pomeranian Voivodeship (north-central Poland)
- Spławie, Września County in Greater Poland Voivodeship (west-central Poland)
- Spławie, Sławno County in West Pomeranian Voivodeship (north-west Poland)
- Spławie, Stargard County in West Pomeranian Voivodeship (north-west Poland)
