= Nacław, Greater Poland Voivodeship =

Nacław
- Village
- Location within Poland
- Coordinates: 52°3′46″N 16°38′17″E
- Country: Poland
- Voivodeship: Greater Poland
- County: Kościan
- Gmina: Kościan
- Population: 281

Nacław [ˈnat͡swaf] is a village in the administrative district of Gmina Kościan, within Kościan County, Greater Poland Voivodeship, in west-central Poland.
