= Osiek, Kościan County =

Osiek
- Village
- Location within Poland
- Coordinates: 52°0′39″N 16°44′40″E
- Country: Poland
- Voivodeship: Greater Poland
- County: Kościan
- Gmina: Kościan
- Population: 178

Osiek [ˈɔɕɛk] is a village in the administrative district of Gmina Kościan, within Kościan County, Greater Poland Voivodeship, in west-central Poland.
