= Smolno, Greater Poland Voivodeship =

Smolno
- Village
- Location within Poland
- Coordinates: 51°58′12″N 16°29′59″E
- Country: Poland
- Voivodeship: Greater Poland
- County: Kościan
- Gmina: Śmigiel

Smolno [ˈsmɔlnɔ] is a village in the administrative district of Gmina Śmigiel, within Kościan County, Greater Poland Voivodeship, in west-central Poland.
