= Jezierzyce, Greater Poland Voivodeship =

Jezierzyce
- Village
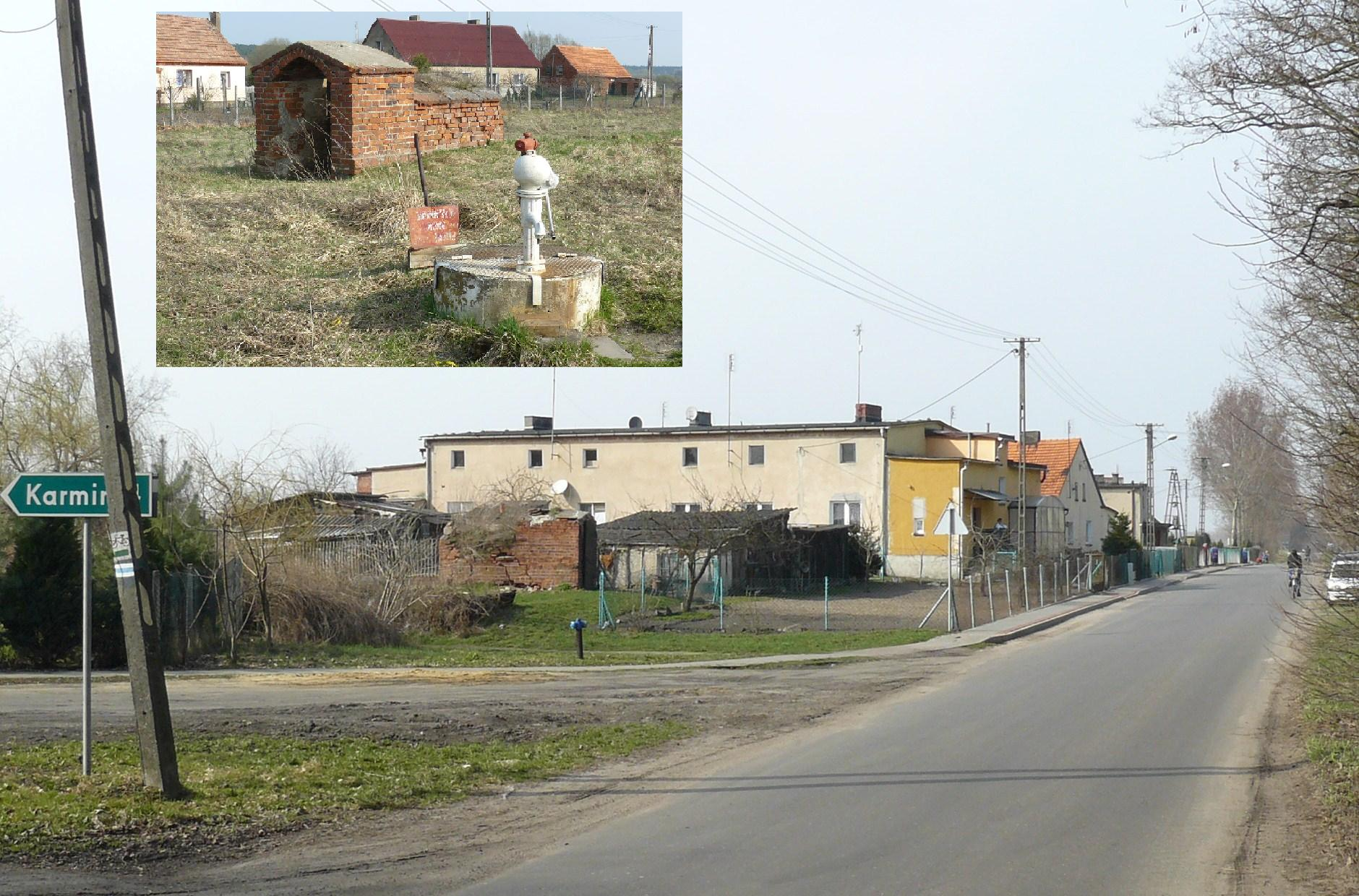
- Street of Jezierzyce, Greater Poland Voivodeship

- Location within Poland
- Coordinates: 51°58′48″N 16°42′15″E
- Country: Poland
- Voivodeship: Greater Poland
- County: Kościan
- Gmina: Śmigiel
- Website: http://www.zygmuntowo.webpark.pl/_jez_wiec.htm

Jezierzyce [jɛʑɛˈʐɨt͡sɛ] is a village in the administrative district of Gmina Śmigiel, within Kościan County, Greater Poland Voivodeship, in west-central Poland.
