= Nadolnik, Kościan County =

Nadolnik
- Village
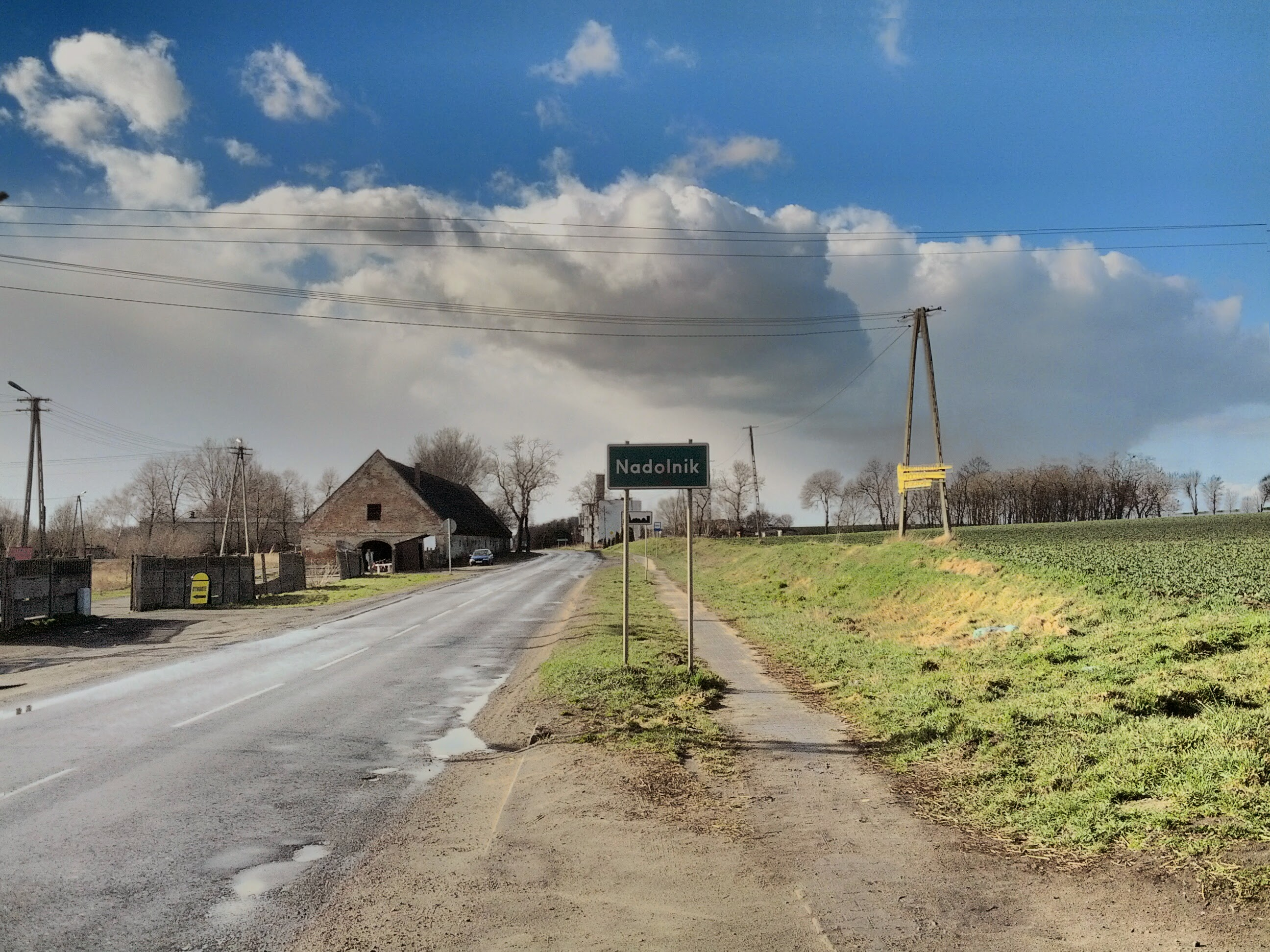
- Road sign in Nadolnik

- Location within Poland
- Coordinates: 52°02′40″N 16°31′30″E
- Country: Poland
- Voivodeship: Greater Poland
- County: Kościan
- Gmina: Śmigiel

Nadolnik [naˈdɔlnik] is a village in the administrative district of Gmina Śmigiel, within Kościan County, Greater Poland Voivodeship, in west-central Poland.
