= Mikoszki =

- Village
- Location within Poland
- Coordinates: 52°8′56″N 16°40′10″E
- Country: Poland
- Voivodeship: Greater Poland
- County: Kościan
- Gmina: Kościan
- Population: 223

Mikoszki [miˈkɔʂki] is a village in the administrative district of Gmina Kościan, within Kościan County, Greater Poland Voivodeship, in west-central Poland.
