= Granecznik =

- Settlement
- Location within Poland
- Coordinates: 52°01′29″N 16°46′48″E
- Country: Poland
- Voivodeship: Greater Poland
- County: Kościan
- Gmina: Kościan
- Population: 37

Granecznik [ɡraˈnɛt͡ʂnik] is a settlement in the administrative district of Gmina Kościan, within Kościan County, Greater Poland Voivodeship, in west-central Poland.
