= Nowe Szczepankowo =

- Village
- Location within Poland
- Coordinates: 51°58′30″N 16°26′09″E
- Country: Poland
- Voivodeship: Greater Poland
- County: Kościan
- Gmina: Śmigiel

Nowe Szczepankowo [ˈnɔvɛ ʂt͡ʂɛpanˈkɔvɔ] is a village in the administrative district of Gmina Śmigiel, within Kościan County, Greater Poland Voivodeship, in west-central Poland.
