= Stare Bojanowo =

- Village
- Location within Poland
- Coordinates: 51°59′36″N 16°35′1″E
- Country: Poland
- Voivodeship: Greater Poland
- County: Kościan
- Gmina: Śmigiel
- Population: 1,750

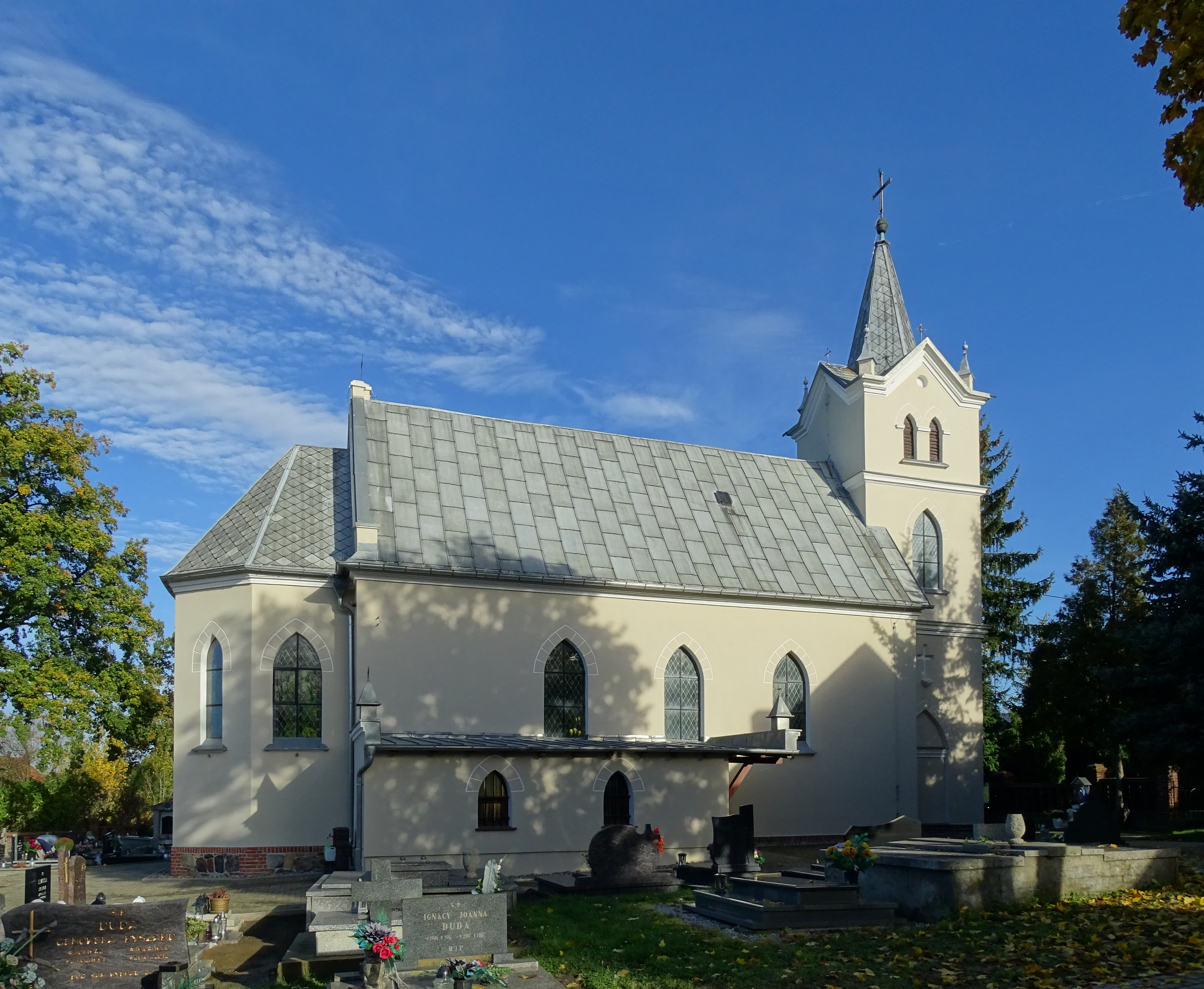
Saint Bartholomew's Church from the 19th century

Stare Bojanowo [ˈstarɛ bɔjaˈnɔvɔ] is a village in the administrative district of Gmina Śmigiel, within Kościan County, Greater Poland Voivodeship, in west-central Poland.
