= Stara Przysieka Druga =

- Village
- Location within Poland
- Coordinates: 52°00′57″N 16°38′36″E
- Country: Poland
- Voivodeship: Greater Poland
- County: Kościan
- Gmina: Śmigiel

Stara Przysieka Druga [ˈstara pʂɨˈɕɛka ˈdruɡa] is a village in the administrative district of Gmina Śmigiel, within Kościan County, Greater Poland Voivodeship, in west-central Poland.
