= Poniński =

Coat of arms of Princes Poninski from 1837

The House of Poniński is an old Polish noble family that derived from the place of Ponin. Members of the family held the title of Prince.

== Notable members ==
- Adam Poniński (1732–1798), Polish nobleman, Prince, Marshal of the Sejm, Deputy Crown Treasurer
- Adam Poniński (1758–1816), Polish nobleman, Prince, politician (deputy to Grodno Sejm), soldier and officer
- Alfred Poniński (1896–1968), Polish diplomat and journalist
- Ewa Konopacka née Ponińska (born 1926) Polish World War II resistance fighter, participant in the Warsaw Uprising
