= Morownica =

- Village
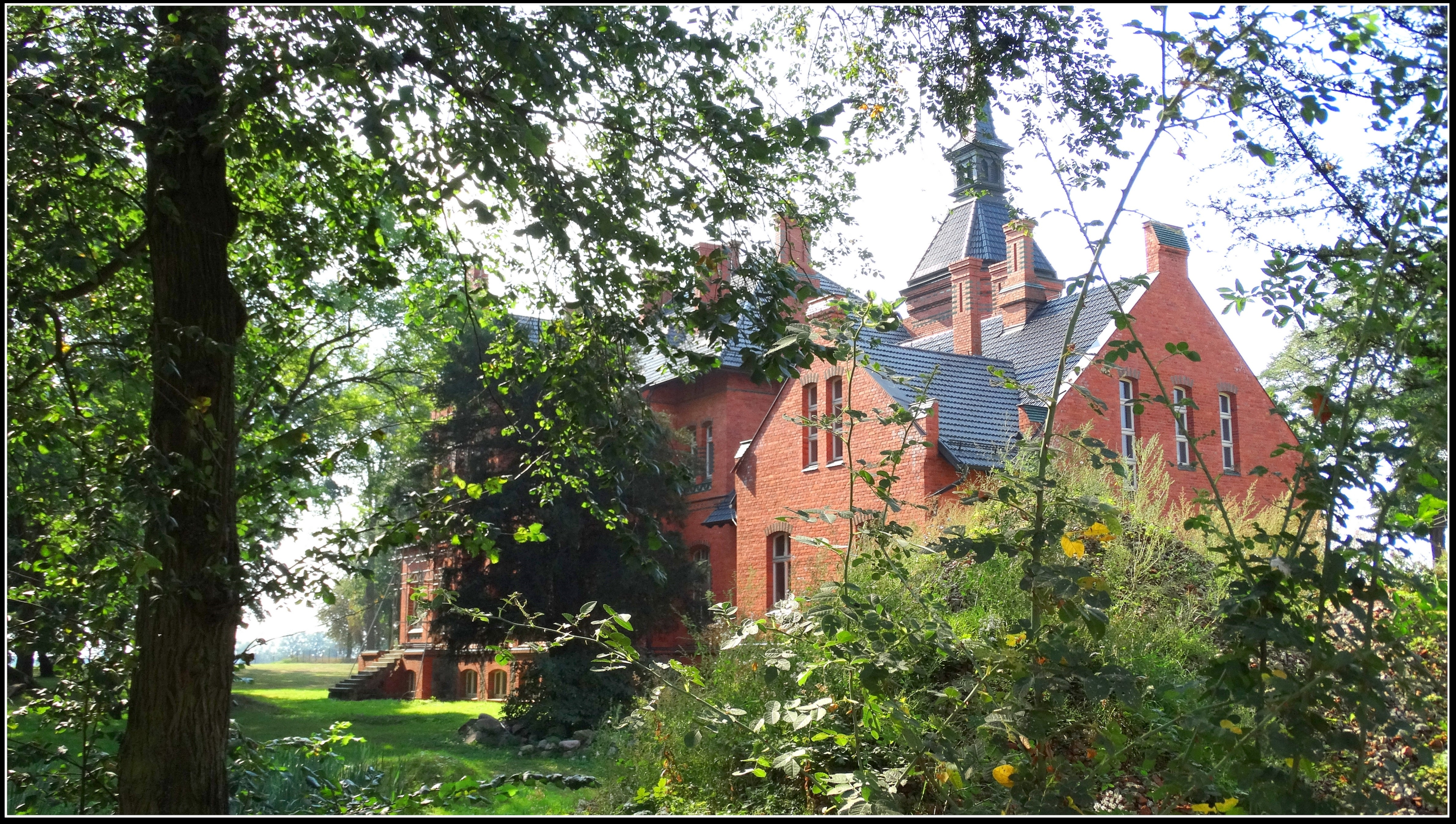
- Manor in the village

- Location within Poland
- Coordinates: 51°59′N 16°28′E
- Country: Poland
- Voivodeship: Greater Poland
- County: Kościan
- Gmina: Śmigiel

Population
  - Total: 450

Morownica [mɔrɔvˈnit͡sa] is a village in the administrative district of Gmina Śmigiel, within Kościan County, Greater Poland Voivodeship, in west-central Poland.
