= Racot =

- Village
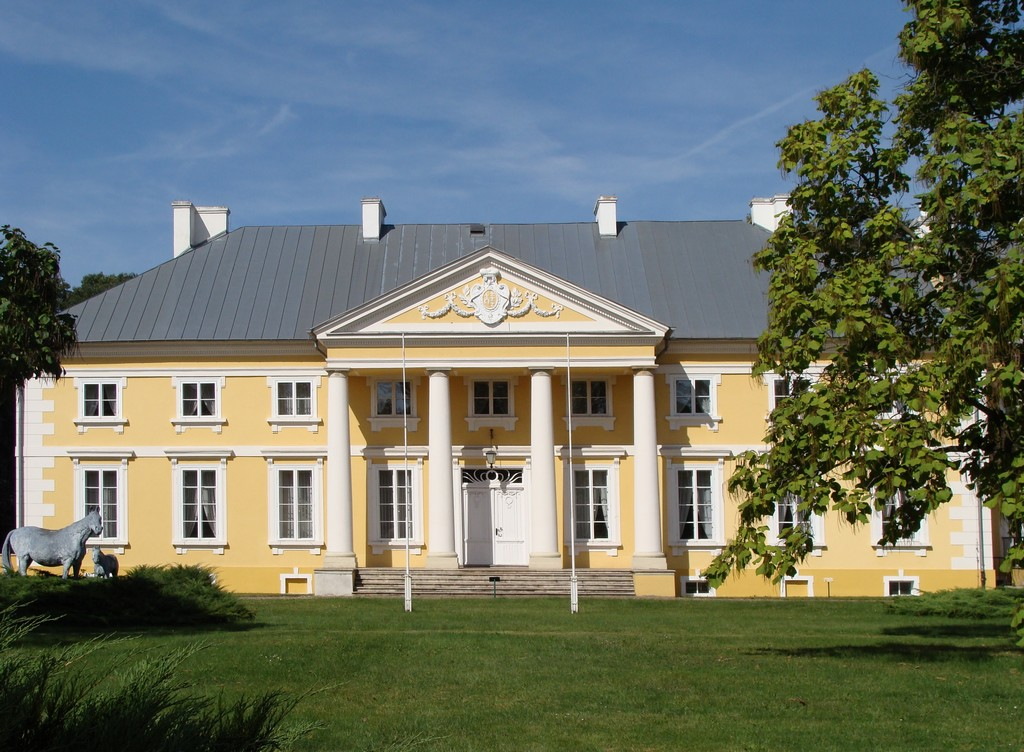
- Jabłonowski Palace

- Location within Poland
- Coordinates: 52°3′23″N 16°42′53″E
- Country: Poland
- Voivodeship: Greater Poland
- County: Kościan
- Gmina: Kościan
- Population: 1,321
- Website: http://www.racot.net

Racot [ˈrat͡sɔt] is a village in the administrative district of Gmina Kościan, within Kościan County, Greater Poland Voivodeship, in west-central Poland.
