= Jeligowo =

- Settlement
- Country: Poland
- Voivodeship: Greater Poland
- County: Kościan
- Gmina: Śmigiel

Jeligowo [jɛliˈɡɔvɔ] is a settlement in the administrative district of Gmina Śmigiel, within Kościan County, Greater Poland Voivodeship, in west-central Poland.
