= Kurowo, Kościan County =

Kurowo
- Village
- Location within Poland
- Coordinates: 52°7′27″N 16°39′20″E
- Country: Poland
- Voivodeship: Greater Poland
- County: Kościan
- Gmina: Kościan
- Population: 343

Kurowo [kuˈrɔvɔ] is a village in the administrative district of Gmina Kościan, within Kościan County, Greater Poland Voivodeship, in west-central Poland.
