= Białecki =

Białecki, feminine: Białecka; plural: Białeccy) is a Polish-language surname. It is a toponymic surname literally meaning "from Białcz".

Notable people with this surname include:

- Greg Bialecki, American attorney and government figure
- Irena Wiszniewska-Białecka (1947–2018), Polish lawyer, professor
- Małgorzata Białecka (born 1988), Polish windsurfer
- Róża Kolumba Białecka (1838–1887), Polish Venerable nun, the founder of the Polish community of Dominican Sisters of the Immaculate Conception
- Sebastian Białecki, Polish darts player
- Zbigniew Białecki, several people
  - Zbigniew Białecki, Polish chemical engineer, the namesake of the Bialecki ring
  - Zbigniew Białecki (born 1925), Polish politician, member of Parliament
  - Zbigniew Białecki (born 1933), Polish politician, member of Parliament

== See also ==
- Białczyński, another surname with the etymology "from Białcz"
- Bielecki
