= Czarkowo, Kościan County =

Czarkowo
- Village
- Location within Poland
- Coordinates: 52°4′11″N 16°37′41″E
- Country: Poland
- Voivodeship: Greater Poland
- County: Kościan
- Gmina: Kościan
- Population: 177

Czarkowo [t͡ʂarˈkɔvɔ] is a village in the administrative district of Gmina Kościan, within Kościan County, Greater Poland Voivodeship, in west-central Poland.
