= Podśmigiel =

- Settlement
- Location within Poland
- Coordinates: 51°59′03″N 16°30′12″E
- Country: Poland
- Voivodeship: Greater Poland
- County: Kościan
- Gmina: Śmigiel

Podśmigiel [pɔtɕˈmiɡʲɛl] is a settlement in the administrative district of Gmina Śmigiel, within Kościan County, Greater Poland Voivodeship, in west-central Poland.
