= Olszewo, Kościan County =

Olszewo
- Village
- Location within Poland
- Coordinates: 51°58′N 16°37′E
- Country: Poland
- Voivodeship: Greater Poland
- County: Kościan
- Gmina: Śmigiel

Olszewo [ɔlˈʂɛvɔ] is a village in the administrative district of Gmina Śmigiel, within Kościan County, Greater Poland Voivodeship, in west-central Poland.
