= Nietążkowo =

- Village
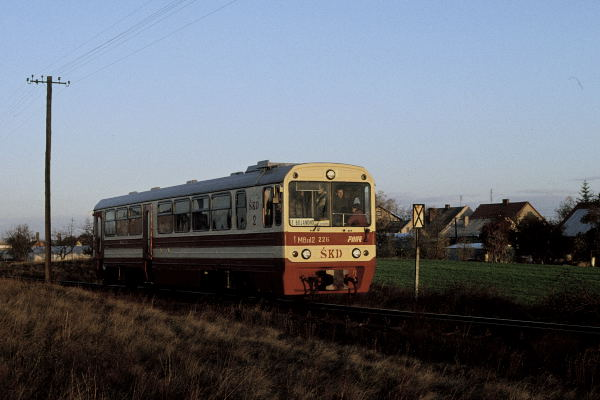
- Train in Nietazkowo

- Location within Poland
- Coordinates: 51°59′50″N 16°31′57″E
- Country: Poland
- Voivodeship: Greater Poland
- County: Kościan
- Gmina: Śmigiel

Nietążkowo [ɲɛtɔ̃ʂˈkɔvɔ] is a village in the administrative district of Gmina Śmigiel, within Kościan County, Greater Poland Voivodeship, in west-central Poland.
