= Stare Szczepankowo =

- Settlement
- Location within Poland
- Coordinates: 51°38′48″N 16°26′38″E
- Country: Poland
- Voivodeship: Greater Poland
- County: Kościan
- Gmina: Śmigiel
- Population: 1

Stare Szczepankowo [ˈstarɛ ʂt͡ʂɛpanˈkɔvɔ] is a settlement in the administrative district of Gmina Śmigiel, within Kościan County, Greater Poland Voivodeship, in west-central Poland.
