= Gryżyna, Greater Poland Voivodeship =

Gryżyna
- Village
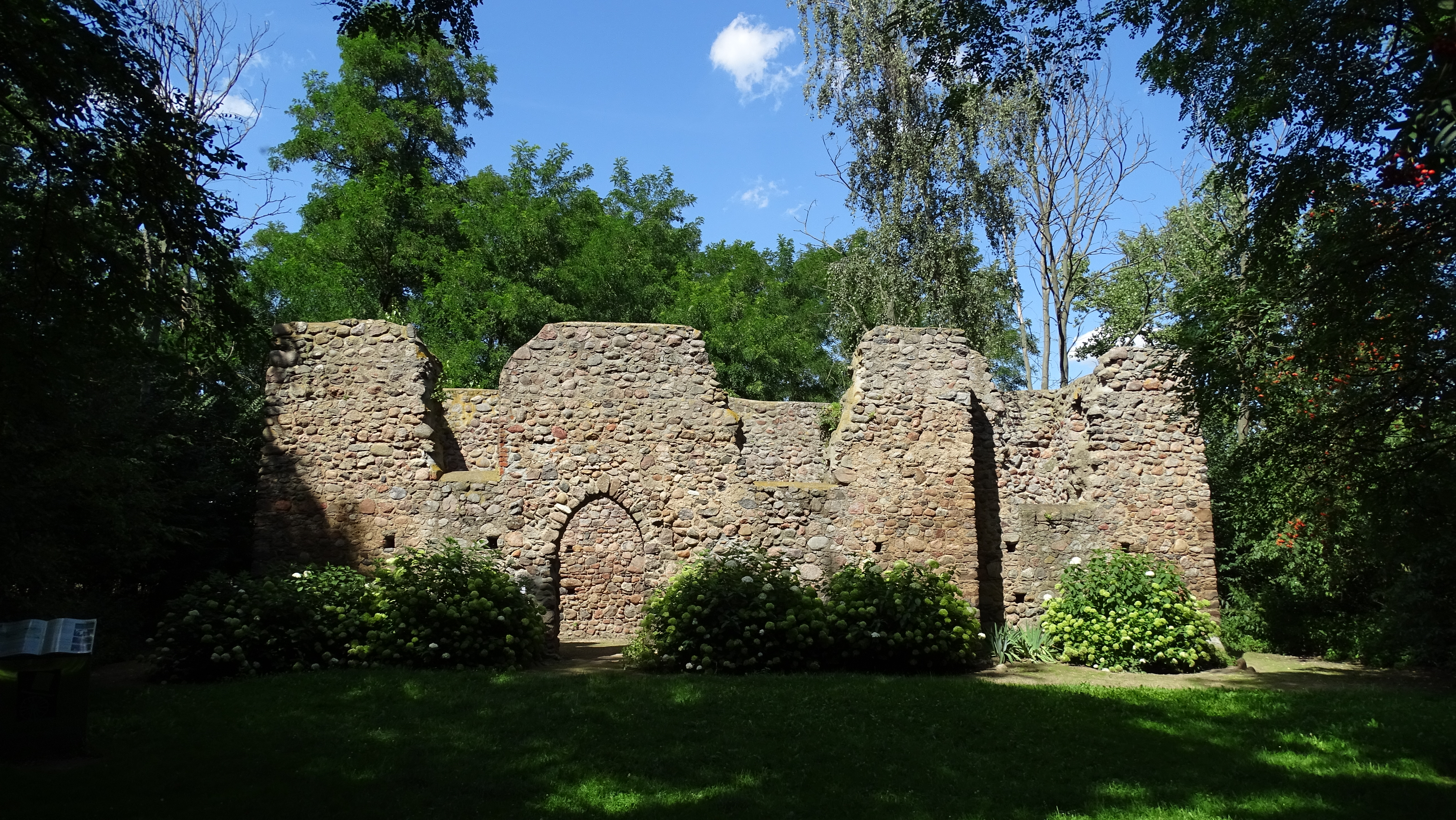
- Ruins of the 13th century Church of Saint Martin

- Location within Poland
- Coordinates: 52°1′52″N 16°42′34″E
- Country: Poland
- Voivodeship: Greater Poland
- County: Kościan
- Gmina: Kościan

Population
  - Total: 360

Gryżyna [ɡrɨˈʐɨna] is a village in the administrative district of Gmina Kościan, within Kościan County, Greater Poland Voivodeship, in west-central Poland.
