= Januszewo, Kościan County =

Januszewo
- Village
- Location within Poland
- Coordinates: 52°0′13″N 16°45′20″E
- Country: Poland
- Voivodeship: Greater Poland
- County: Kościan
- Gmina: Kościan
- Population: 117

Januszewo ([januˈʂɛvɔ]; German: Januszewo, 1939–45 Hausen) is a village in the administrative district of Gmina Kościan, within Kościan County, Greater Poland Voivodeship, in west-central Poland.
