= Tadeusz Myler =

Polish entrepreneur and politician (1949–2022)

Member of the Sejm
- In office 19 October 2001 – 18 October 2005
- Constituency: District No. 36

Personal details
- Born: 19 January 1949 Nowy Lubosz, Poland
- Died: 30 August 2022 (aged 73)
- Party: SLD
- Occupation: Entrepreneur

Tadeusz Myler (19 January 1949 – 30 August 2022) was a Polish entrepreneur and politician. A member of the Democratic Left Alliance, he served in the Sejm from 2001 to 2005.

Myler died on 30 August 2022, at the age of 73.
