= Bielawy, Kościan County =

Bielawy
- Village
- Location within Poland
- Coordinates: 52°3′2″N 16°27′58″E
- Country: Poland
- Voivodeship: Greater Poland
- County: Kościan
- Gmina: Śmigiel

Bielawy ([bjɛˈlavɨ]; German: Bielawy, 1939–45 Bielen) is a village in the administrative district of Gmina Śmigiel, within Kościan County, Greater Poland Voivodeship, in west-central Poland.
