= Katarzynin =

- Village
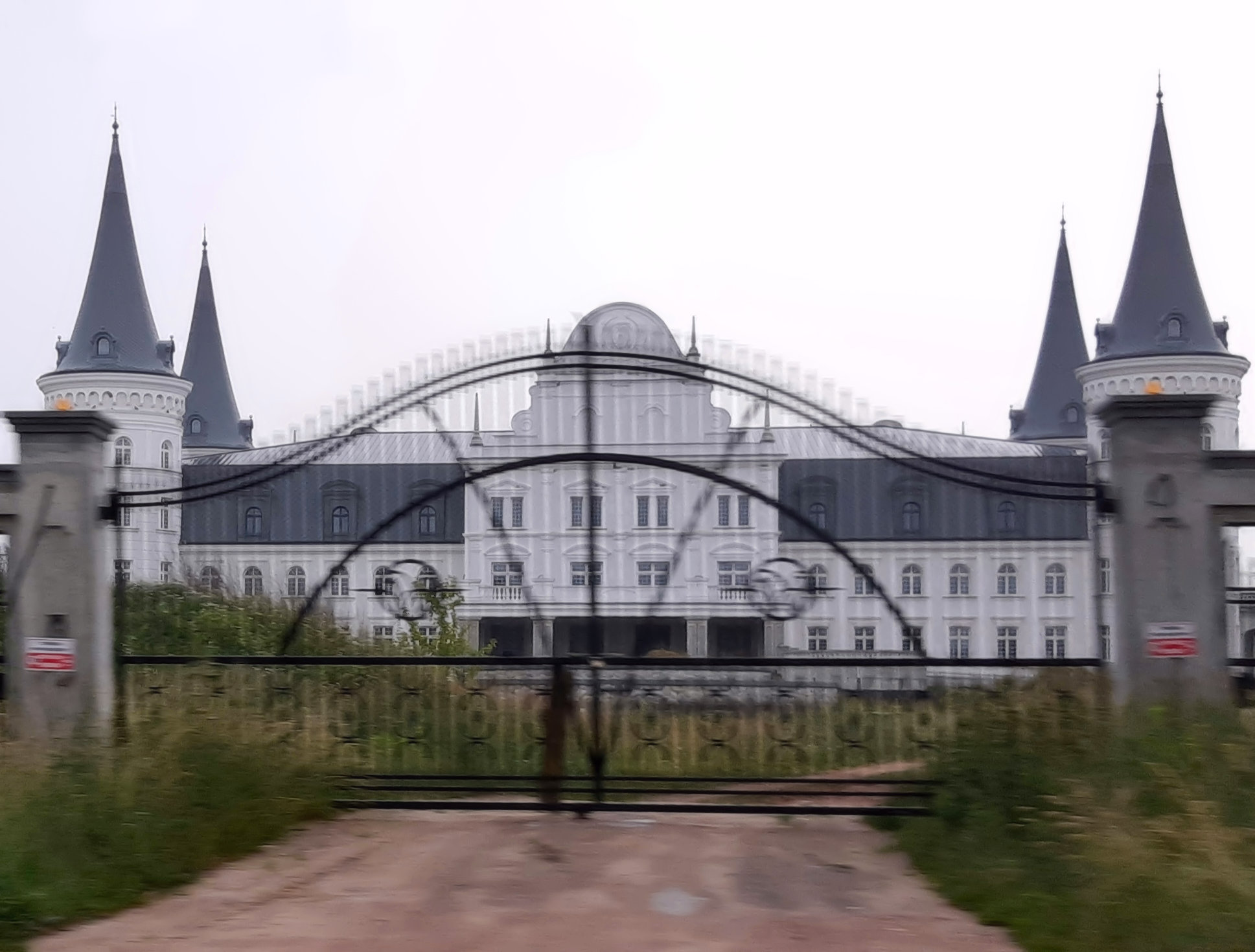
- 'Four Towers' Castle

- Location within Poland
- Coordinates: 52°2′26″N 16°44′44″E
- Country: Poland
- Voivodeship: Greater Poland
- County: Kościan
- Gmina: Kościan
- Population: 245

Katarzynin [kataˈʐɨnin] is a village in the administrative district of Gmina Kościan, within Kościan County, Greater Poland Voivodeship, in west-central Poland.
