= Karmin, Kościan County =

Karmin
- Village
- Location within Poland
- Coordinates: 51°59′N 16°39′E
- Country: Poland
- Voivodeship: Greater Poland
- County: Kościan
- Gmina: Śmigiel

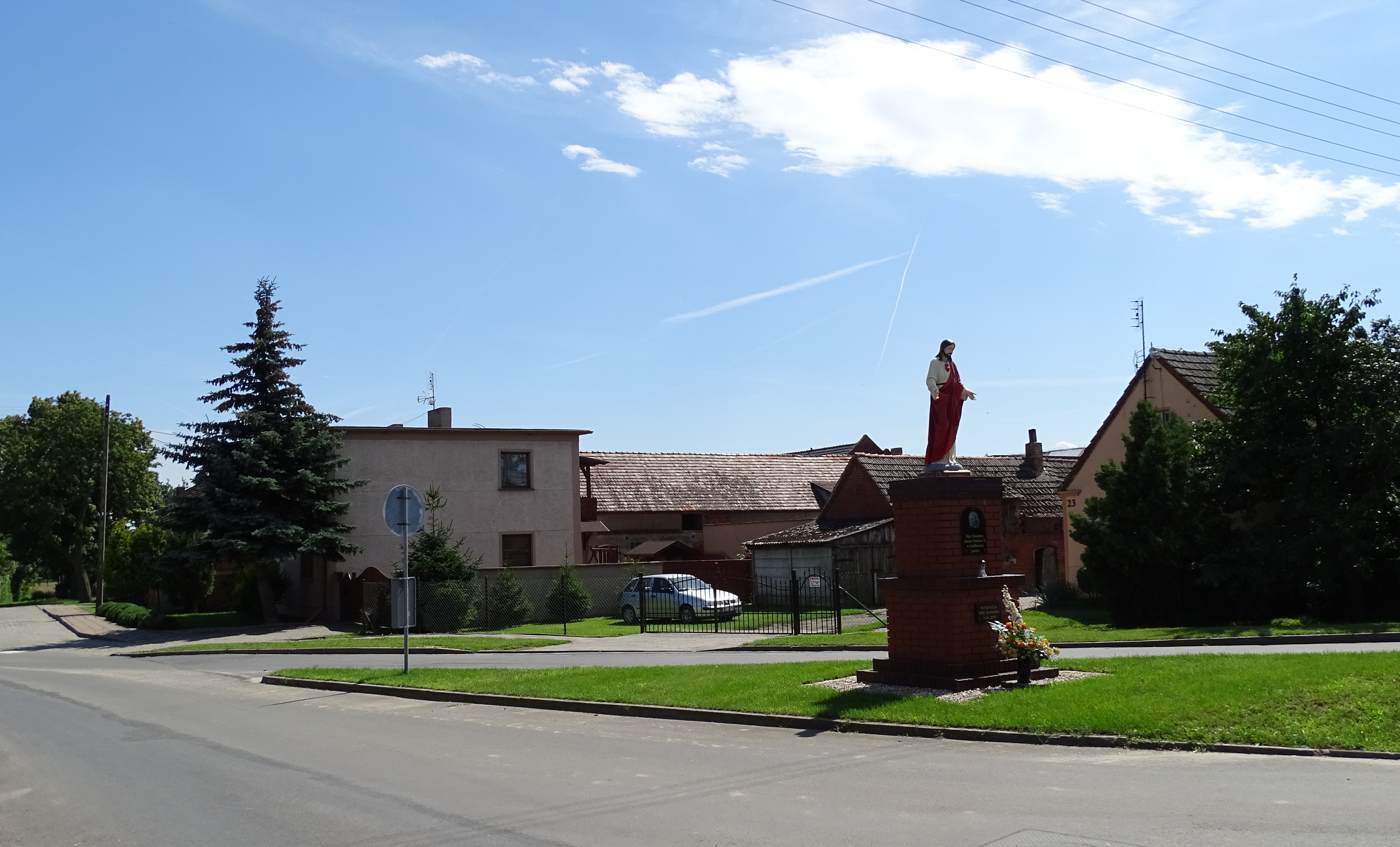
Figure of Jesus Christ.

Karmin [ˈkarmin] is a village in the administrative district of Gmina Śmigiel, within Kościan County, Greater Poland Voivodeship, in west-central Poland.
