= Bronikowo =

Bronikowo may refer to the following places:

- Bronikowo, Greater Poland Voivodeship (west-central Poland)
- Bronikowo, Lubusz Voivodeship (west Poland)
- Bronikowo, Warmian-Masurian Voivodeship (north Poland)
- Bronikowo, West Pomeranian Voivodeship (north-west Poland)
