= Koszanowo =

Koszanowo may refer to the following places:

- Koszanowo, Kościan County in Greater Poland Voivodeship (west-central Poland)
- Koszanowo, Szamotuły County in Greater Poland Voivodeship (west-central Poland)
- Koszanowo, Kuyavian-Pomeranian Voivodeship (north-central Poland)
- Koszanowo, West Pomeranian Voivodeship (north-west Poland)
