= Brzeziny, Kościan County =

Brzeziny
- Village
- Location within Poland
- Coordinates: 52°1′13″N 16°39′1″E
- Country: Poland
- Voivodeship: Greater Poland
- County: Kościan
- Gmina: Śmigiel

Brzeziny [bʐɛˈʑinɨ] is a village in the administrative district of Gmina Śmigiel, within Kościan County, Greater Poland Voivodeship, in west-central Poland.
