= Żydowo, Kościan County =

Żydowo
- Village
- Location within Poland
- Coordinates: 52°0′14″N 16°36′45″E
- Country: Poland
- Voivodeship: Greater Poland
- County: Kościan
- Gmina: Śmigiel

Żydowo [ʐɨˈdɔvɔ] is a village in the administrative district of Gmina Śmigiel, within Kościan County, Greater Poland Voivodeship, in west-central Poland.
