= Parsko =

Parsko may refer to:

- Parsko, Greater Poland Voivodeship, a village in the administrative district of Gmina Śmigiel, Poland
- Parsko, West Pomeranian Voivodeship, a settlement in the administrative district of Gmina Barlinek, Myślibórz County, Poland

== See also ==
- Parski (disambiguation)
