= Mała Wyskoć =

- Settlement
- Location within Poland
- Coordinates: 52°03′20″N 16°45′40″E
- Country: Poland
- Voivodeship: Greater Poland
- County: Kościan
- Gmina: Kościan
- Population: 69

Mała Wyskoć [ˈmawa ˈvɨskɔt͡ɕ] is a hamlet in the administrative district of Gmina Kościan, in Kościan County, Greater Poland Voivodeship, in west-central Poland.
