= Bonikowo =

- Village
- Location within Poland
- Coordinates: 52°7′27″N 16°37′54″E
- Country: Poland
- Voivodeship: Greater Poland
- County: Kościan
- Gmina: Kościan
- Population: 483

Bonikowo [bɔniˈkɔvɔ] is a village in the administrative district of Gmina Kościan, within Kościan County, Greater Poland Voivodeship, in west-central Poland.

== Population ==
As of the 2011 census, the village of Bonikowo in Gmina Kościan, Kościan County, Greater Poland Voivodeship, Poland, had a population of 499, By 2021 this figure was estimated at 514, comprising 255 males and 259 females.
