= Chełkowo =

- Village
- Location within Poland
- Coordinates: 51°58′48″N 16°40′23″E
- Country: Poland
- Voivodeship: Greater Poland
- County: Kościan
- Gmina: Śmigiel

Chełkowo [xɛu̯ˈkɔvɔ] is a village in the administrative district of Gmina Śmigiel, within Kościan County, Greater Poland Voivodeship, in west-central Poland.
