= Stary Lubosz =

- Village
- Location within Poland
- Coordinates: 52°4′33″N 16°42′37″E
- Country: Poland
- Voivodeship: Greater Poland
- County: Kościan
- Gmina: Kościan
- Population: 890

Stary Lubosz [ˈstarɨ ˈlubɔʂ] is a village in the administrative district of Gmina Kościan, within Kościan County, Greater Poland Voivodeship, in west-central Poland.
