= Wonieść, Greater Poland Voivodeship =

Wonieść
- Village
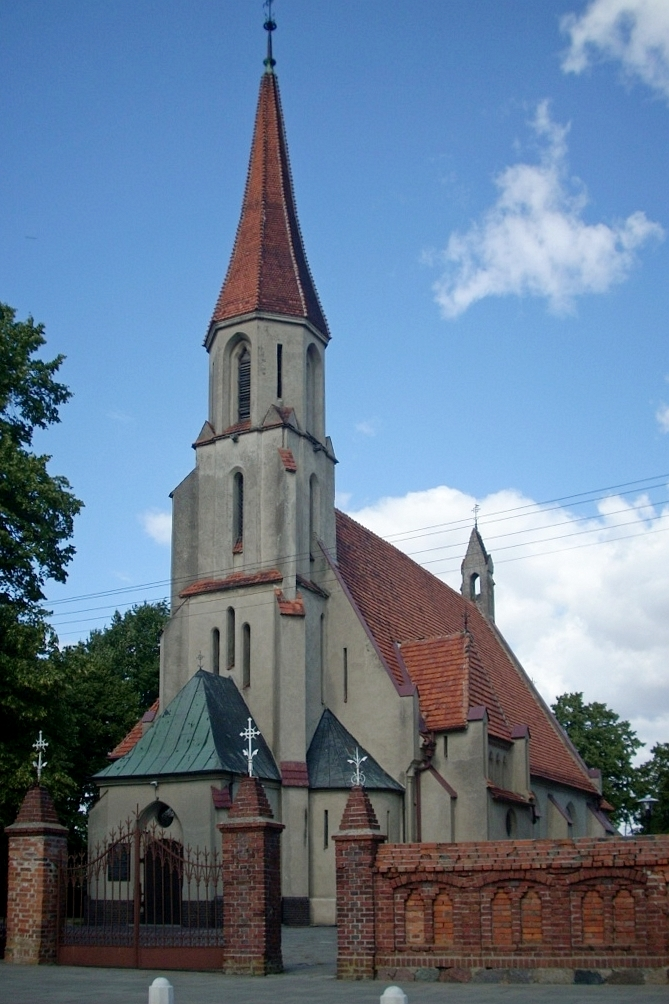
- Saint Lawrence Church

- Location within Poland
- Coordinates: 52°1′N 16°41′E
- Country: Poland
- Voivodeship: Greater Poland
- County: Kościan
- Gmina: Śmigiel

Wonieść [ˈvɔɲɛɕt͡ɕ] is a village in western Poland, in Greater Poland Voivodeship, in Kościan County, in the administrative district of gmina Śmigiel.

Wonieść lies beside Lake Wonieść. In the village, there are St. Lawrence church and a hospital specializing in treating neurosis.
