= Ignacewo, Kościan County =

Ignacewo
- Settlement
- Location within Poland
- Coordinates: 52°2′17″N 16°47′23″E
- Country: Poland
- Voivodeship: Greater Poland
- County: Kościan
- Gmina: Kościan
- Population: 30

Ignacewo [iɡnaˈt͡sɛvɔ] is a settlement in the administrative district of Gmina Kościan, within Kościan County, Greater Poland Voivodeship, in west-central Poland.
