= Marian Jankowski =

Polish weightlifter

Personal information
- Nationality: Polish
- Born: 8 December 1931 Robaczyn, Poland
- Died: 9 March 2017 (aged 85) Warsaw, Poland

Sport
- Sport: Weightlifting

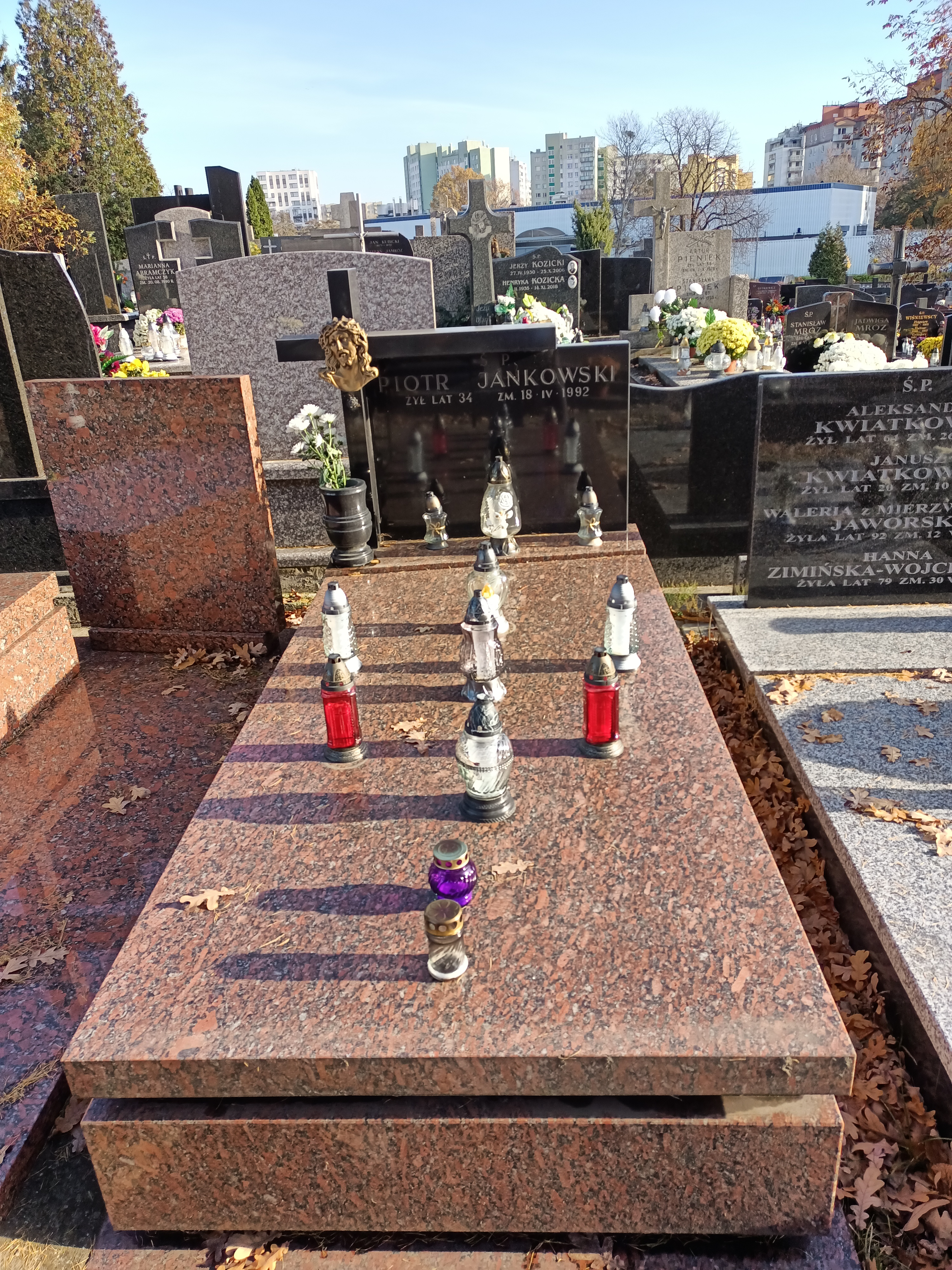

Marian Jankowski (8 December 1931 – 9 March 2017) was a Polish weightlifter. He competed in the men's bantamweight event at the 1960 Summer Olympics.
