= Borucki =

Borucki (Polish feminine: Borucka; plural: Boruccy) is a surname. Notable people with the surname include:

- Anna Borucka-Cieślewicz (born 1941), Polish politician
- Percy Borucki (born 1929), German fencer
- Ryan Borucki (born 1994), American baseball player
- William J. Borucki (born 1939), American space scientist
