= Gurostwo =

- Settlement
- Location within Poland
- Coordinates: 52°04′14″N 16°39′14″E
- Country: Poland
- Voivodeship: Greater Poland
- County: Kościan
- Gmina: Kościan
- Population: 5

Gurostwo [ɡuˈrɔstfɔ] is a settlement in the administrative district of Gmina Kościan, within Kościan County, Greater Poland Voivodeship, in west-central Poland.
