= Darnowo, Greater Poland Voivodeship =

Darnowo
- Village
- Location within Poland
- Coordinates: 52°3′47″N 16°44′1″E
- Country: Poland
- Voivodeship: Greater Poland
- County: Kościan
- Gmina: Kościan
- Population: 303

Darnowo [darˈnɔvɔ] is a village in the administrative district of Gmina Kościan, within Kościan County, Greater Poland Voivodeship, in west-central Poland.
