= Żegrówko =

- Village
- Location within Poland
- Coordinates: 52°3′N 16°29′E
- Country: Poland
- Voivodeship: Greater Poland
- County: Kościan
- Gmina: Śmigiel

Żegrówko [ʐɛˈɡrufkɔ] is a village in the administrative district of Gmina Śmigiel, within Kościan County, Greater Poland Voivodeship, in west-central Poland.
