= Kawczyn, Kościan County =

Kawczyn
- Village
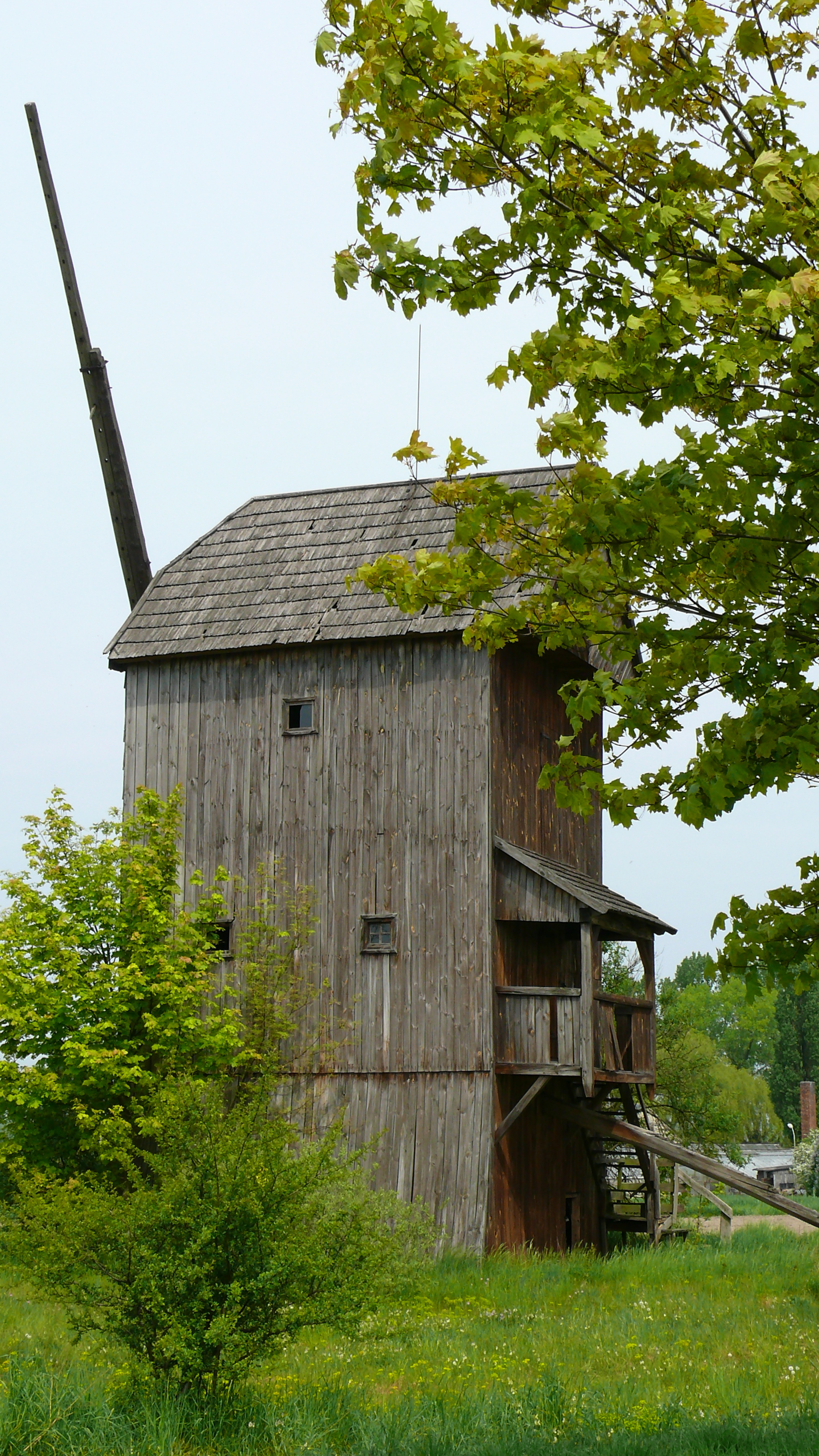
- Windmill in Kawczyn

- Location within Poland
- Coordinates: 52°7′40″N 16°41′2″E
- Country: Poland
- Voivodeship: Greater Poland
- County: Kościan
- Gmina: Kościan
- Population: 154

Kawczyn [ˈkaft͡ʂɨn] is a village in the administrative district of Gmina Kościan, within Kościan County, Greater Poland Voivodeship, in west-central Poland.
