= Kurza Góra =

- Village
- Location within Poland
- Coordinates: 52°4′37″N 16°39′45″E
- Country: Poland
- Voivodeship: Greater Poland
- County: Kościan
- Gmina: Kościan
- Population: 842

Kurza Góra [ˈkuʐa ˈɡura] is a village in the administrative district of Gmina Kościan, within Kościan County, Greater Poland Voivodeship, in west-central Poland.
