= Wronowo, Greater Poland Voivodeship =

Wronowo
- Village
- Location within Poland
- Coordinates: 52°05′16″N 16°49′37″E
- Country: Poland
- Voivodeship: Greater Poland
- County: Kościan
- Gmina: Kościan
- Population: 19

Wronowo [vrɔˈnɔvɔ] is a village in the administrative district of Gmina Kościan, within Kościan County, Greater Poland Voivodeship, in west-central Poland.
