= Nowy Świat, Kościan County =

Nowy Świat
- Village
- Location within Poland
- Coordinates: 52°01′20″N 16°28′14″E
- Country: Poland
- Voivodeship: Greater Poland
- County: Kościan
- Gmina: Śmigiel

Nowy Świat (Polish pronunciation: [ˈnɔvɨ ˈɕfjat]) is a village in the administrative district of Gmina Śmigiel, within Kościan County, Greater Poland Voivodeship, in west-central Poland.
