= Skoraczewo, Greater Poland Voivodeship =

Skoraczewo
- Village
- Location within Poland
- Coordinates: 52°04′16″N 16°31′38″E
- Country: Poland
- Voivodeship: Greater Poland
- County: Kościan
- Gmina: Śmigiel

Skoraczewo [skɔraˈt͡ʂɛvɔ] is a village in the administrative district of Gmina Śmigiel, within Kościan County, Greater Poland Voivodeship, in west-central Poland.
