= Gniewowo, Greater Poland Voivodeship =

Gniewowo
- Village
- Location within Poland
- Coordinates: 52°0′55″N 16°39′56″E
- Country: Poland
- Voivodeship: Greater Poland
- County: Kościan
- Gmina: Śmigiel
- Population: 50

Gniewowo [ɡɲɛˈvɔvɔ] is a village in the administrative district of Gmina Śmigiel, within Kościan County, Greater Poland Voivodeship, in west-central Poland.
