= Gryżynka =

- Settlement
- Location within Poland
- Coordinates: 52°00′19″N 16°42′03″E
- Country: Poland
- Voivodeship: Greater Poland
- County: Kościan
- Gmina: Kościan
- Population: 4

Gryżynka [ɡrɨˈʐɨnka] is a settlement in the administrative district of Gmina Kościan within Kościan County, Greater Poland Voivodeship, in west-central Poland.
