= Łagiewniki, Kościan County =

Łagiewniki
- Village
- Location within Poland
- Coordinates: 52°9′18″N 16°36′19″E
- Country: Poland
- Voivodeship: Greater Poland
- County: Kościan
- Gmina: Kościan
- Population: 225

Łagiewniki [waɡʲɛvˈniki] is a village in the administrative district of Gmina Kościan, within Kościan County, Greater Poland Voivodeship, in west-central Poland.
