= Glińsko =

- Village
- Location within Poland
- Coordinates: 52°1′N 16°32′E
- Country: Poland
- Voivodeship: Greater Poland
- County: Kościan
- Gmina: Śmigiel
- Population: 180

Glińsko [ˈɡliɲskɔ] is a village in the administrative district of Gmina Śmigiel, within Kościan County, Greater Poland Voivodeship, in west-central Poland.
