= Pianowo =

- Village
- Location within Poland
- Coordinates: 52°6′7″N 16°40′33″E
- Country: Poland
- Voivodeship: Greater Poland
- County: Kościan
- Gmina: Kościan
- Population: 234

Pianowo (Polish: [pjaˈnɔvɔ]) is a village in the administrative district of Gmina Kościan, within Kościan County, Greater Poland Voivodeship, in west-central Poland.
