= Wyskoć =

- Village
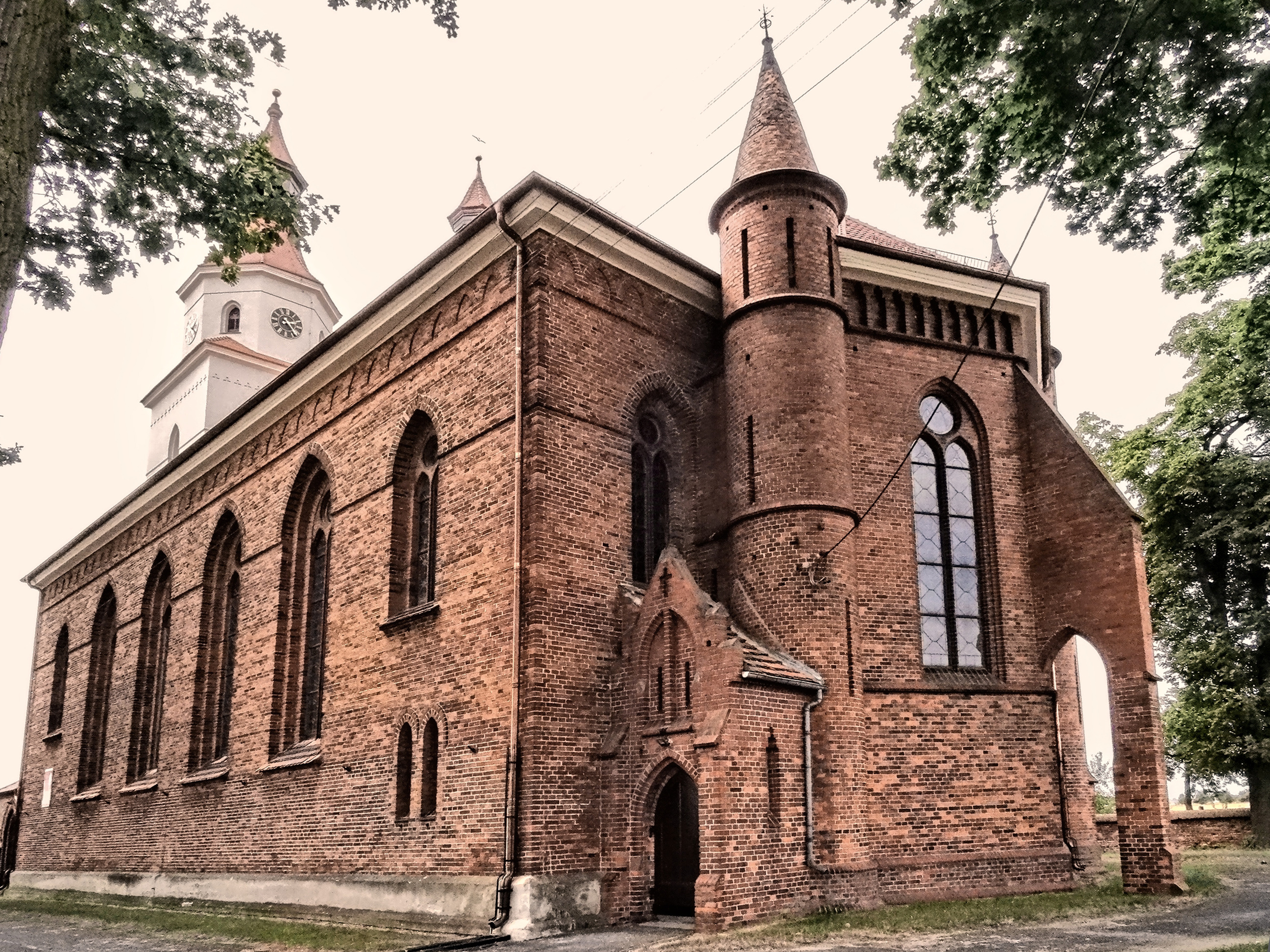
- Church in Wyskoć

- Location within Poland
- Coordinates: 52°4′N 16°48′E
- Country: Poland
- Voivodeship: Greater Poland
- County: Kościan
- Gmina: Kościan
- Population: 389

Wyskoć [ˈvɨskɔt͡ɕ] is a village in the administrative district of Gmina Kościan, within Kościan County, Greater Poland Voivodeship, in west-central Poland.
