= Widziszewo =

- Village
- Location within Poland
- Coordinates: 52°2′19″N 16°36′7″E
- Country: Poland
- Voivodeship: Greater Poland
- County: Kościan
- Gmina: Kościan
- Population: 1,400

Widziszewo [vid͡ʑiˈʂɛvɔ] is a village in the administrative district of Gmina Kościan, within Kościan County, Greater Poland Voivodeship, in west-central Poland.
