= Dryja coat of arms =

Polish coat of arms

Dryja
- Alternative names: Drya, Mutina
- Earliest mention: 1352
- Towns: none
- Families: 78 altogether: Bieczkowski, Borysowicz, Boryszkowski, Borzejowski, Bożejewski, Bożejowski, Chłapowski, Chodorowicz, Czabowski, Czewiaszko, Czyżewicz, Czyżewski, Czyżowski, Drya, Dryniakiewicz, Dryon, Drzniewicz, Dyament, Dyamentowski, Dziechciński, Dziechtarski, Dziembiński, Dzierzbiński, Dzikowicki, Dzirbiński, Estka, Estko, Gabliński, Galewski, Gałęzki, Gamalej, Głębocki, Górecki, Grabieński, Grodzicki, Jenicz, Kiszewa, Kiszewski, Kopydłowski, Kozaryn, Krepsztul, Kwinta, Kwinto, Lesek, Lesenko, Lisiecki, Lisiewski, Łukomski, Modlibowski, Mroczyński, Mruczyński, Mutyna, Niemierzewski, Okulicz-Kozaryn, Orzelski, Osiecki, Pikiel, Poświątkowski, Prewysz, Radecki, Ronowski, Rudzicki, Runowski, Siąski, Tawtygierd, Tomicki, Towtygert, Towtygiert, Trambczyński, Trapczeński, Trąbczyński, Trąmbczyński, Trąpczyński, Troynik, Ubasz, Westerski, Wysocki, Żernicki

Dryja is a Polish coat of arms. It was used by several szlachta families in the times of the Polish–Lithuanian Commonwealth.

== Blazon ==
Gules, on a bend sinister raguled of the same, three jewels or.

== Notable bearers ==
Notable bearers of this coat of arms include:

- Przedpełko Kropidłowski (15th century)
- Dezydery Chłapowski Baron (1788—1879)
- Przybysław Dyjamentowski (1694—1774)
- The Lisiewski family became well known as a family of portrait painters in Germany.

== See also ==
- Polish heraldry
- Heraldry
- Coat of arms
