= Zygmuntowo, Kościan County =

Zygmuntowo
- Village
- Location within Poland
- Coordinates: 51°58′44″N 16°41′16″E
- Country: Poland
- Voivodeship: Greater Poland
- County: Kościan
- Gmina: Śmigiel

Zygmuntowo [zɨɡmunˈtɔvɔ] is a village in the administrative district of Gmina Śmigiel, within Kościan County, Greater Poland Voivodeship, in west-central Poland.
