= Rettich =

Rettich is a surname of German origin, meaning "radish". People with that name include:

- Frans Rettich (1920–1984), Dutch clown
- Karl Rettich (1841–1904), German landscape artist and draftsman
- Meno Rettich (1839–1918), German politician
- Ria Rettich (1939–2006), Dutch painter
- Scott Rettich (born 1984), American racing driver

== See also ==
- Rettig, similar etymology
