= Robaczyn =

- Village
- Location within Poland
- Coordinates: 51°59′N 16°34′E
- Country: Poland
- Voivodeship: Greater Poland
- County: Kościan
- Gmina: Śmigiel

Robaczyn [rɔˈbat͡ʂɨn] is a village in the administrative district of Gmina Śmigiel, within Kościan County, Greater Poland Voivodeship, in west-central Poland.
