= Białcz =

Białcz refers to the following places in Poland:

- Białcz, Greater Poland Voivodeship
- Białcz, Lubusz Voivodeship
- Nowy Białcz
- Stary Białcz
