= Nowy Białcz =

- Village
- Location within Poland
- Coordinates: 52°03′46″N 16°30′37″E
- Country: Poland
- Voivodeship: Greater Poland
- County: Kościan
- Gmina: Śmigiel

Nowy Białcz [ˈnɔvɨ ˈbjau̯t͡ʂ] is a village in the administrative district of Gmina Śmigiel, within Kościan County, Greater Poland Voivodeship, in west-central Poland.
