= Dezydery Chłapowski =

Polish general, businessman and political activist

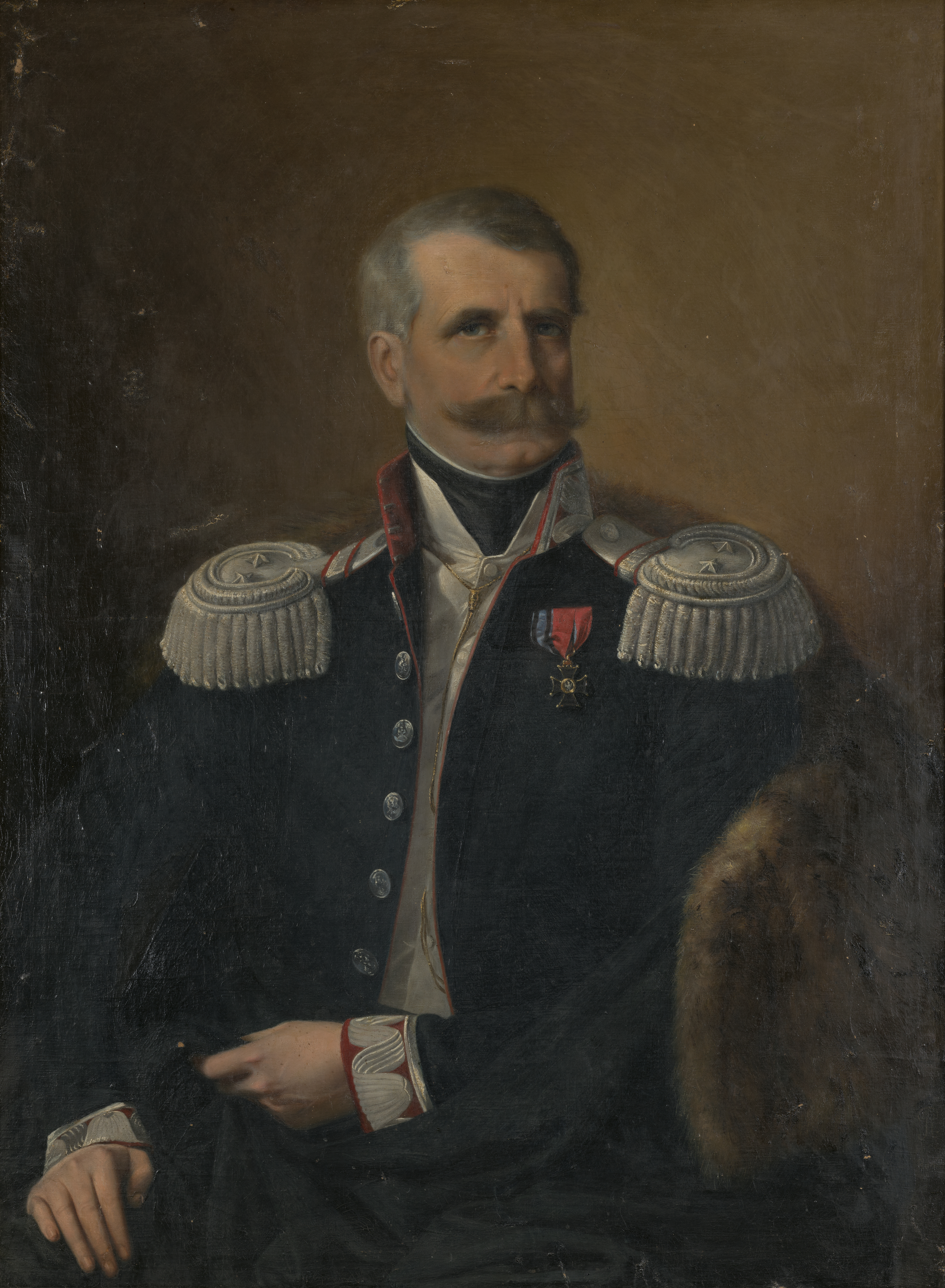
Dezydery Chłapowski

Baron Dezydery Adam Chłapowski (1788 in Turew – 27 March 1879) of the Dryja coat of arms was a Polish general, businessman and political activist.

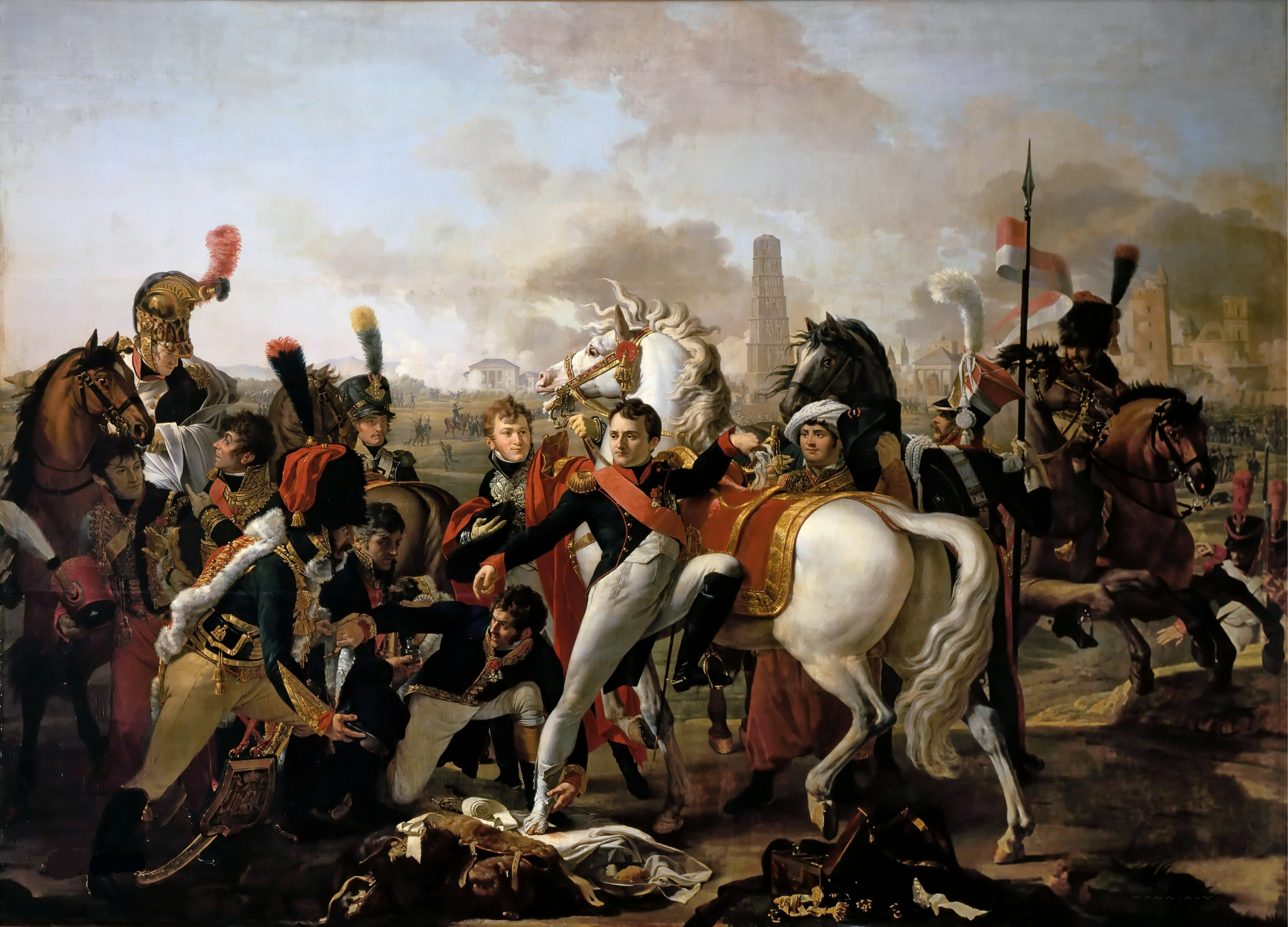
Napoleon Wounded at Ratisbon by Claude Gautherot, 1810. Chłapowski in a lancer uniform of the Imperial Guard is on the right.

Baron Chłapowskis' coat of arms (French empire)

== Early life ==
His father Józef Chłapowski (born 1756, died 1826) was the baron of Kościan County and his mother Urszula was from the Moszczeńska family. His tutor as a child was the French immigrant priest Steinhoff. He began his education at the Piarist university in Rydzyna and then in Berlin.

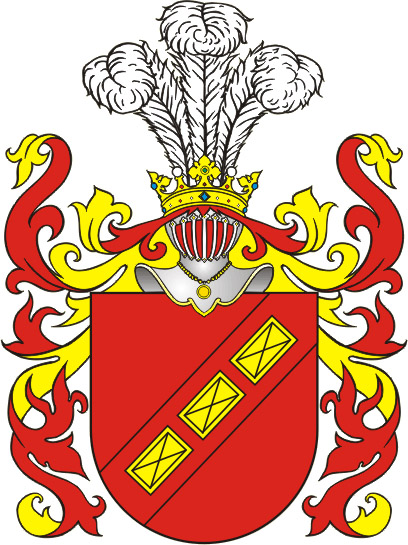
Polish noble Dryja coat of arms

== Napoleonic Wars ==
At the age of 14, his father placed him in the Prussian dragoon regiment of General Bruesewitz that was stationed in Greater Poland. Simultaneously, the young soldier studied at the Berlin Inspection Officers Institute, from which he graduated in 1805 with a promotion to lieutenant. In 1806, he sought exemption from participating in the war with Napoleonic France.

After the Berlin's occupation by the French, he left for Poznań. Here he joined the hundred-man honor guard of Emperor Napoleon formed by the local nobility after the Greater Poland uprising under the command of Umiński. During this period he gained favor with Napoleon, who appointed him a lieutenant. During the 1807 campaign, he fought in the voltigeur company of the 9th Infantry Regiment commanded by General Fr. Antoni Paweł Sułkowski formed in Gniezno. Decorated after the battle of Tczew, as a half-company commander, the Virtuti Militari cross and the Legion of Honour. During the siege of Danzig, he was captured by the Prussians.

After the Treaties of Tilsit and returning from Riga, where he was interned, he was promoted to captain on August 1 and assigned as General Jan Henryk Dąbrowski's adjutant. In February 1808 he was summoned to Paris, where he became Napoleon's orderly officer. During this stay, he graduated from military studies at the Paris École Polytechnique. He passed the final exams before General Bertrand. He went through Spanish and Austrian campaigns alongside Napoleon. He was awarded the title Baron of the Empire for his participation in the Battle of Regensburg. In January 1811, he was appointed the head of a squadron of the 1st Polish Light Cavalry Regiment of the Imperial Guard. With it he partook in the French invasion of Russia and War of the Sixth Coalition. During the latter, in Dresden, he asked for dismissal, which he obtained on 19 June. The decision was caused by Chłapowski's bitterness over Napoleon's attitude towards Poland (plans to give the Duchy of Warsaw to the Tsar in exchange for peace) and the hardships of the campaigns he had gone through. Among the Napoleonic veterans, however, this action was badly received with accusations of desertion. As a retired colonel, he left for Paris. After Napoleon's abdication, he went to Great Britain. In 1815, during the Hundred Days, he returned to Greater Poland through Paris.

== Congress Poland ==
He settled in his hometown Turwia, which he and Rąbin bought back from the debtor father of a professor, and then tidied up the property and began introducing a modern economy. To deepen their knowledge once again went on a trip to England ( 1818 - 1819 ), where among other things practiced physically working on the farm. Upon his return, he introduced solutions observed in England. Thanks to this, he repaid debts within 15 years and the property in Turwia quickly became one of the best farms in the Grand Duchy of Poznań . Chłapowski among others he introduced crop rotation instead of three- crop, used an iron plow and sowed soil enrichmentclover . As a result, Chłapowski was one of the guests invited to a conference in Berlin, where a plan of enfranchisement of peasants in the Grand Duchy was developed. He, for his part, allocated some of his land to parcel among peasants. In 1821 he married Antonina née Grudziński, sister of the Łowicz duchess Joanna, wife of the grand prince Konstanty . He was a deputy from the knighthood from the Kościan poviat to the provincial parliament of the Grand Duchy of Poznań in 1827 [1] and in 1830 [2] . He was a co-founder and activist of Credit Land and Fire Insurance Association. Palace in Turwia

== November uprising ==
When the November Uprising broke out, he put on his uniform again and crossed the border, reporting to the Polish insurgent army. He has developed a bold and interesting offensive plan, including capture of Lithuania's Brest, but it was not approved by Józef Chłopicki, the uprising's dictator, who preferred defensive tactics. It was only after Chłopicki's removal that Chłapowski received the command of a brigade. He took part in the battle of Grochów, in which he led a cavalry charge, holding back Russian infantry after the withdrawal of Polish infantry. Then, under the command of the inept general Antanas Gelgaudas, he partook in the expedition to Lithuania during which he was promoted to the rank of Brigadier General. Despite a number of minor victories, Giełgud's indecision about Chłapowski's offensive plans for a quick attack on Vilnius before the arrival of major Russian forces led to the defeat of the expedition. By decision of the National Council, Chłapowski was finally promoted to the rank of division general and was entrusted with the supreme command in Lithuania, but it did not arrive in time (Chłapowski found out about it only in Prussia). The unit was forced to cross the Prussian-Russian border, where Chłapowski, as a Prussian subject, was sentenced to one year in prison. He avoided the confiscation of property and the punishment was instead converted into a large fine. He served his sentence in the Stettin fortress, where he wrote a textbook On agriculture.

== After the failed Uprising ==
After release, he returned to Turwia. He was politically associated with his former subordinate Karol Marcinkowski. In the years 1838 - 1845 worked with the Guide Agricultural and Industrial, which posted articles of agriculture. He intended to set up an Agricultural University, which was to educate numerous apprentices at the Turkish estate. Among them were later activists such as Maksymilian Jackowski. He was also a co-founder and publisher of Przegląd Poznański and Sunday School. Throughout his activities he laid the foundations of organic work, thereby resisting Germanization. He supported enterprises such as the Poznań Bazaar and the Scientific Assistance Society as well as credit societies. He was a member of the national parliament. Correspondent member of the Galician Economic Society (1846-1879).

During the Greater Poland Uprising, he organized insurgent troops in his powiat. After the fall of the Spring of Nations, in Greater Poland, he became a member of the upper house of the Prussian Parliament, the House of Lords.

Despite his strictness and Catholic views, which discouraged some liberals, his achievements made him a widely respected person with a great impact on the community of Greater Poland. He died on March 27, 1879, and was buried in Rąbin next to the local church. In 1899, his son, Kazimierz, published his father's diaries.

Major General from April 25, 2014 Dezydery Chłapowski is the patron of the Ground Forces Training Center in Wędrzyn .

The general was also a promoter of mid-field tree plantings in Poland, which contributed to the economic success of his property and is still favorable to agriculture in this area. In order to preserve his agricultural and natural heritage, in 1992 and again in 2014, a Landscape Park was created around his estate in Turwia. Its special purpose is to preserve the system of mid-field plantings with "(...) high natural, landscape, scientific, didactic and cultural values."

== See also ==
- History of Poland (1795–1918)
