= Parsko, Greater Poland Voivodeship =

Parsko
- Village
- Location within Poland
- Coordinates: 52°00′20″N 16°38′22″E
- Country: Poland
- Voivodeship: Greater Poland
- County: Kościan
- Gmina: Śmigiel

Parsko [ˈparskɔ] is a village in the administrative district of Gmina Śmigiel, within Kościan County, Greater Poland Voivodeship, in west-central Poland.
