= Gmina Śmigiel =

Gmina Śmigiel Śmigiel Commune
- Gmina
- Coat of arms
- Interactive map of Gmina Śmigiel
- Coordinates (Śmigiel): 52°0′33″N 16°31′7″E
- Country: Poland
- Voivodeship: Greater Poland
- County: Kościan
- Seat: Śmigiel

Area
  - Total: 189.89 km^{2} (73.32 sq mi)

Population (2011)
  - Total: 17,647
  - Density: 92.933/km^{2} (240.69/sq mi)
  - Urban: 5,619
  - Rural: 12,028
- Time zone: UTC+1 (CET)
  - Summer (DST): UTC+2 (CEST)
- Website: www.smigiel.pl

Gmina Śmigiel is an urban-rural gmina (administrative district) in Kościan County, Greater Poland Voivodeship, in west-central Poland. Its seat is the town of Śmigiel, which lies approximately 13 kilometres (8 mi) south-west of Kościan and 52 km (32 mi) south-west of the regional capital Poznań.

The gmina covers an area of 189.89 square kilometres (73.3 sq mi), and as of 2006 its total population is 17,465 (out of which the population of Śmigiel amounts to 5,452, and the population of the rural part of the gmina is 12,013).

== Villages ==
Apart from the town of Śmigiel, Gmina Śmigiel contains the villages and settlements of Bielawy, Bronikowo, Brońsko, Bruszczewo, Brzeziny, Chełkowo, Czacz, Czaczyk, Glińsko, Gniewowo, Jeligowo, Jezierzyce, Karmin, Karpisz, Karśnice, Koszanowo, Księginki, Machcin, Morownica, Nadolnik, Nietążkowo, Nowa Wieś, Nowe Szczepankowo, Nowy Białcz, Nowy Świat, Olszewo, Parsko, Podśmigiel, Poladowo, Prętkowice, Przysieka Polska, Robaczyn, Sierpowo, Sikorzyn, Skoraczewo, Smolno, Spławie, Stara Przysieka Druga, Stara Przysieka Pierwsza, Stare Bojanowo, Stare Szczepankowo, Stary Białcz, Wonieść, Wydorowo, Żegrówko, Żegrowo, Żydowo and Zygmuntowo.

== Neighbouring gminas ==
Gmina Śmigiel is bordered by the gminas of Kamieniec, Kościan, Krzywiń, Lipno, Osieczna, Przemęt, Wielichowo and Włoszakowice.
