= Parski =

Parski may refer to:

- Parski, Kuyavian-Pomeranian Voivodeship, a village in the administrative district of Gmina Grudziądz, Grudziądz County, Poland
- Parski, Łódź Voivodeship, a village in the administrative district of Gmina Świnice Warckie, Łęczyca County, Poland

== See also ==
- Parsko (disambiguation)
