= Spławie, Kościan County =

Spławie
- Village
- Location within Poland
- Coordinates: 51°59′N 16°38′E
- Country: Poland
- Voivodeship: Greater Poland
- County: Kościan
- Gmina: Śmigiel
- Website: http://www.splawie.ad2.pl

Spławie [ˈspwavjɛ] is a village in the administrative district of Gmina Śmigiel, within Kościan County, Greater Poland Voivodeship, in west-central Poland.
