= Stare Oborzyska =

- Village
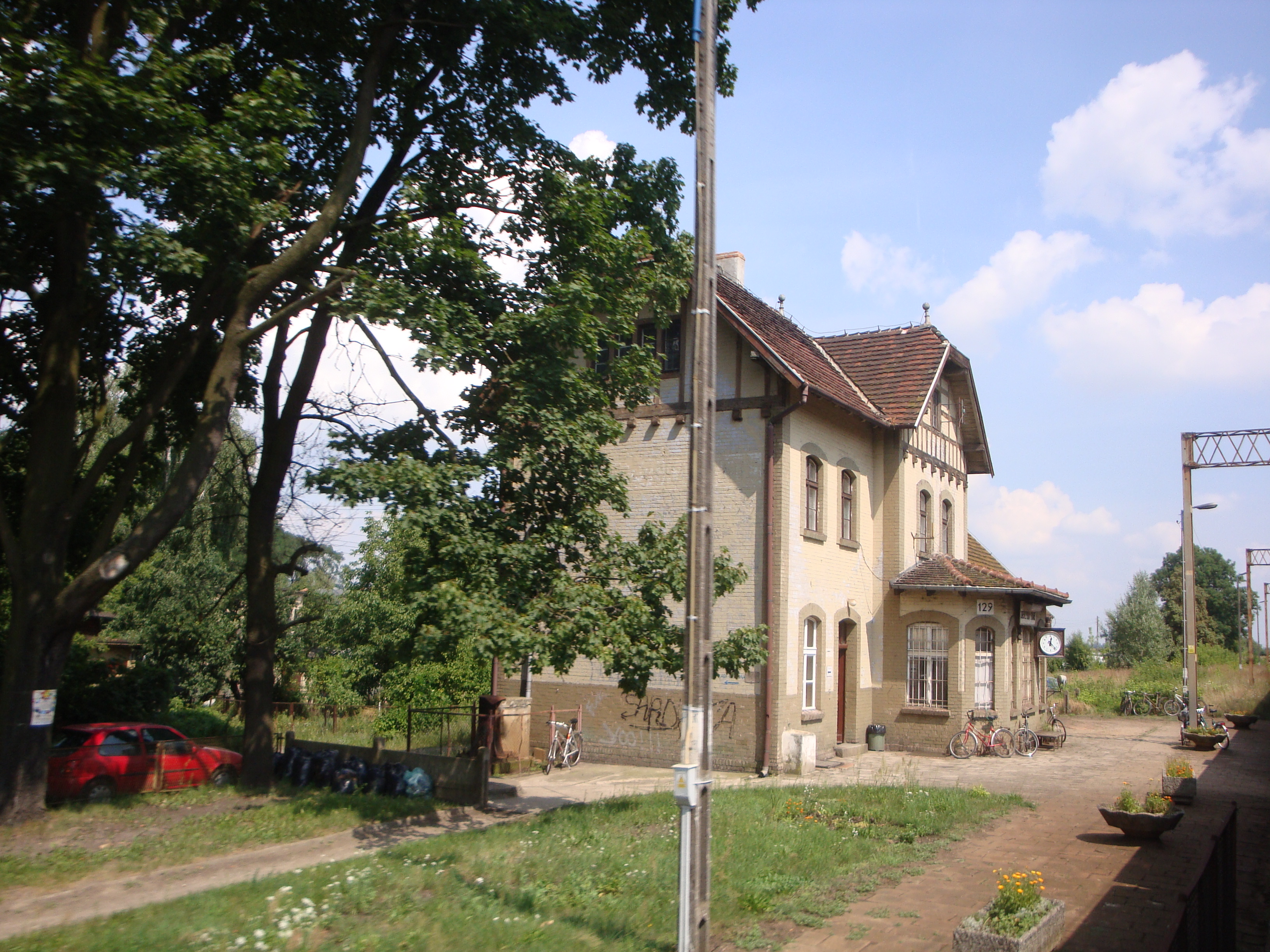
- Train station

- Location within Poland
- Coordinates: 52°6′36″N 16°41′57″E
- Country: Poland
- Voivodeship: Greater Poland
- County: Kościan
- Gmina: Kościan

Population
  - Total: 1,120

Stare Oborzyska [ˈstarɛ ɔbɔˈʐɨska] is a village in the administrative district of Gmina Kościan, within Kościan County, Greater Poland Voivodeship, in west-central Poland.
