= Bronikowo, Greater Poland Voivodeship =

Bronikowo
- Village
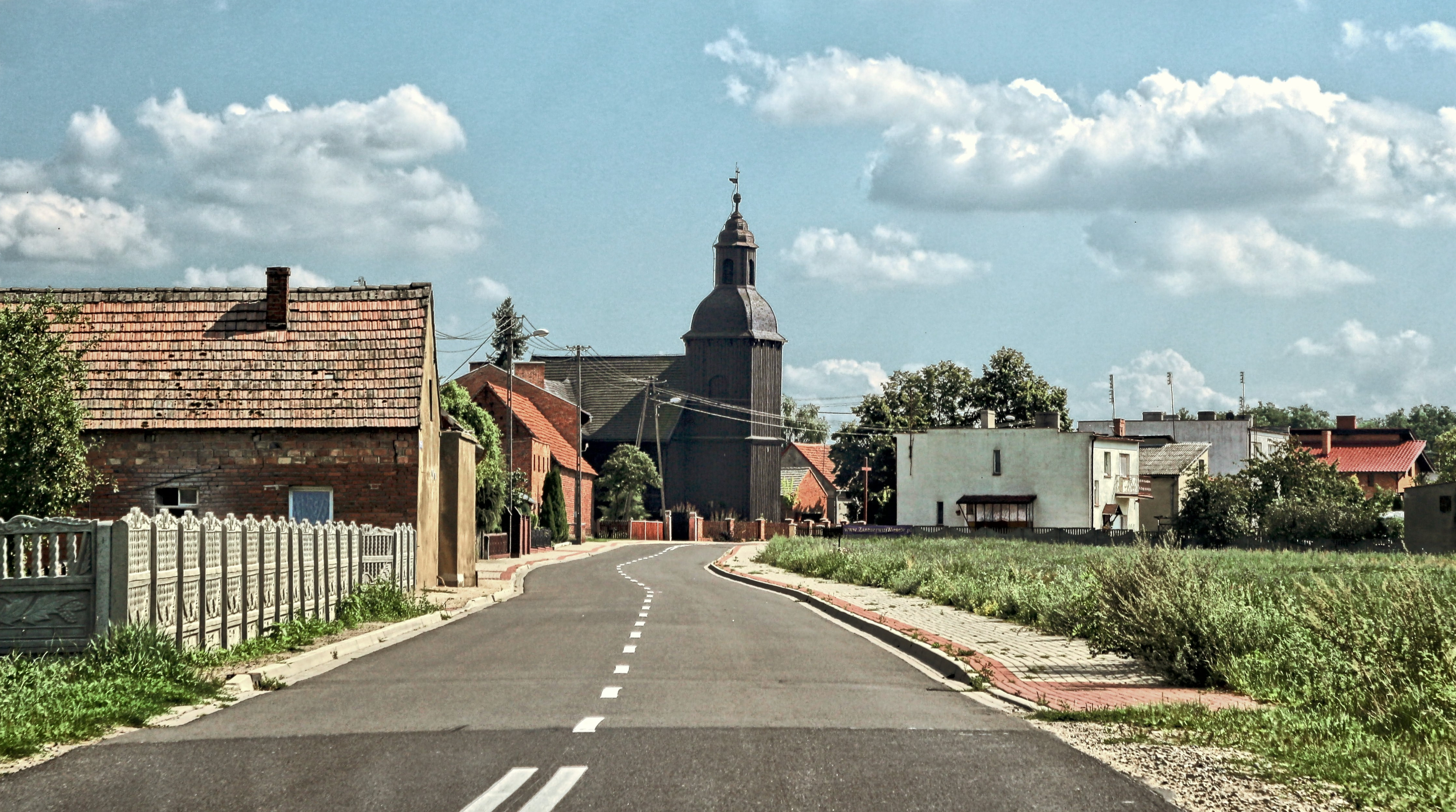

- Location within Poland
- Coordinates: 51°58′N 16°28′E
- Country: Poland
- Voivodeship: Greater Poland
- County: Kościan
- Gmina: Śmigiel
- Elevation: 120 m (390 ft)
- Population: 510
- Website: http://www.bronikowo.pl

Bronikowo [brɔniˈkɔvɔ] is a village in the administrative district of Gmina Śmigiel, within Kościan County, Greater Poland Voivodeship, in west-central Poland.
