= Anna Borucka-Cieślewicz =

Polish politician (born 1941)

Anna Borucka-Cieślewicz (born 26 October 1941, in Zygmuntowo) is a Polish politician, member of the Law and Justice party. She was elected to Sejm on September 23, 2001 (she was a deputy between 24 June 2004 and 18 October 2005, during 4th convocation of the Sejm).

Borucka-Cieślewicz graduated from the Faculty of Mathematics, Physics and Chemistry of Adam Mickiewicz University in Poznań, then obtained a doctorate in mathematical sciences. She worked as a university teacher and belonged to the Polish Mathematical Society.
