= Gmina Kościan =

Gmina Kościan Kościan Commune
- Gmina
- Flag Coat of arms

- Location within Poland
- Coordinates (Kościan): 52°5′N 16°39′E
- Country: Poland
- Voivodeship: Greater Poland
- County: Kościan
- Seat: Kościan

Area
  - Total: 202.27 km^{2} (78.10 sq mi)

Population (2011)
  - Total: 15,617
  - Density: 77.209/km^{2} (199.97/sq mi)
- Website: www.gminakoscian.wokiss.pl

Gmina Kościan is a rural gmina (administrative district) in Kościan County, Greater Poland Voivodeship, in west-central Poland. Its seat is the town of Kościan, although the town is not part of the territory of the gmina.

The gmina covers an area of 202.27 square kilometres (78.1 sq mi), and as of 2006 its total population is 15,042 (15,617 in 2011).

The gmina contains part of the protected area called Chłapowski Landscape Park.

== Villages ==
Gmina Kościan contains the villages and settlements of Bonikowo, Choryń, Czarkowo, Darnowo, Granecznik, Gryżyna, Gryżynka, Gurostwo, Ignacewo, Januszewo, Katarzynin, Kawczyn, Kiełczewo, Kobylniki, Kokorzyn, Krzan, Kurowo, Kurza Góra, Łagiewniki, Mała Wyskoć, Mikoszki, Nacław, Nielęgowo, Nowe Oborzyska, Nowy Dębiec, Nowy Lubosz, Osiek, Pelikan, Pianowo, Ponin, Racot, Sepienko, Sierakowo, Spytkówki, Stare Oborzyska, Stary Lubosz, Szczodrowo, Tamborowo, Turew, Widziszewo, Witkówki, Wławie, Wronowo and Wyskoć.

== Neighbouring gminas ==
Gmina Kościan is bordered by the town of Kościan and by the gminas of Czempiń, Kamieniec, Krzywiń, Śmigiel and Stęszew.
