= Adam Poniński (1758–1816) =

Polish noble (1758–1816)

Adam Poniński (1758–1816) was a Polish nobleman. Prince, politician (deputy to Grodno Sejm), soldier and officer.

== Biography ==
Born into an old, noble House of Poniński, he fought in the Polish–Russian War of 1792 and Kościuszko Uprising. Recipient of Virtuti Militari (in 1792). He reached the rank of a major. In the Uprising he participated in the battle of Racławice; later his regiment failed to arrive at the battle of Maciejowice. This was caused by delayed orders, yet due to his infamous father, also Adam Ponińśki, opponent of the Uprising, Adam was suspected of treason. While his reputation was cleared later by historians, till the end of his life Adam's reputation was seen with suspicion by his contemporaries.
