= Krzan, Poland =

Krzan
- Village
- Location within Poland
- Coordinates: 52°4′53″N 16°32′56″E
- Country: Poland
- Voivodeship: Greater Poland
- County: Kościan
- Gmina: Kościan
- Population: 79

Krzan ([kʂan]) is a village in the administrative district of Gmina Kościan, within Kościan County, Greater Poland Voivodeship, in west-central Poland.
