= Adam Poniński (1732–1798) =

Polish nobleman

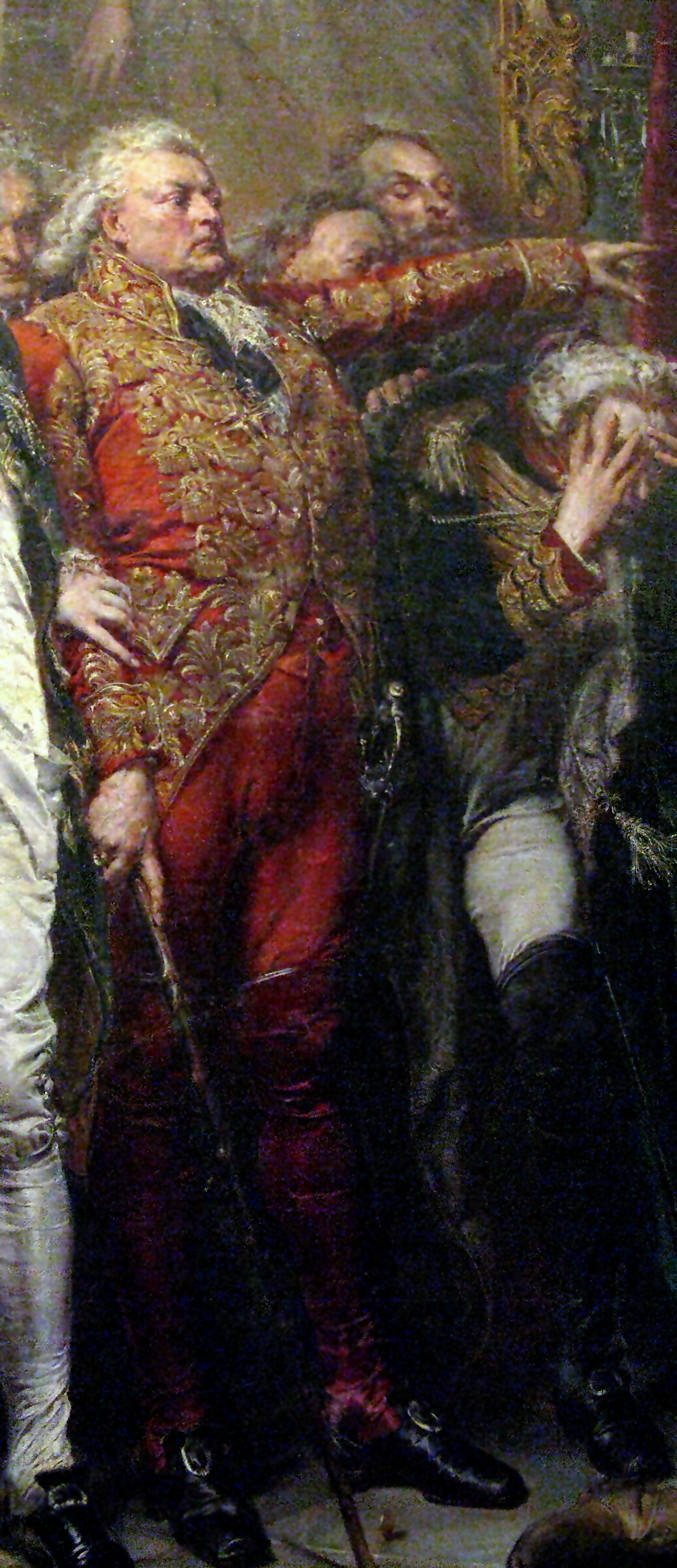
Adam Poniński on a fragment of Jan Matejko's picture

Adam Poniński (1732 or 1733 – 23 July 1798) was a Polish nobleman, Prince and statesman.

== Biography ==
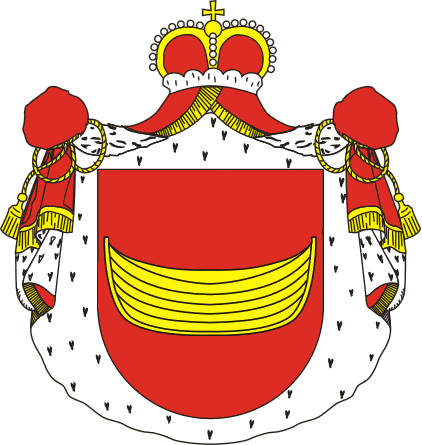
Coat of arms of the Poniński family

Born into an old House of Poniński, Adam was one of the leaders of the Radom Confederation of 1767, Grand Treasurer of the Crown (from 1775), member of the Permanent Council, he is remembered as the infamous Marshal of the Sejm (together with Michał Hieronim Radziwiłł) of the Partition Sejm (1773–1775).

Considered by many contemporaries and historians a traitor, serving Russian ambassadors, he was stripped of all titles and exiled by the decree of the Great Sejm in 1790 but restored soon afterwards by the Confederation of Targowica.

== Personal life ==
He was married to Princess Józefa Zofia Lubomirska (b.1742). Their eldest son, Prince Adam Poniński, became a military general.
