= Rettig ICC =

- Type: Subsidiary
- Industry: Heating systems
- Founded: 2003
- Headquarters: Finland
- Area served: Europe
- Products: Radiators, underfloor heating systems, indoor climate solutions
- Brands: Purmo, Myson, Vogel & Noot, Emmeti, Finimetal
- Parent: Rettig Group

Rettig ICC is Europe's largest manufacturer of domestic heating systems, mainly household radiators; it is part of the larger Finnish Rettig Group.

== History ==
It bought Myson Radiators of the UK in 2000, with Finimetal of France. Rettig bought Vogel & Noot Wärmetechnik in 2002. Rettig ICC was formed in 2003. It bought Emmeti of Italy in December 2015.

== Structure ==
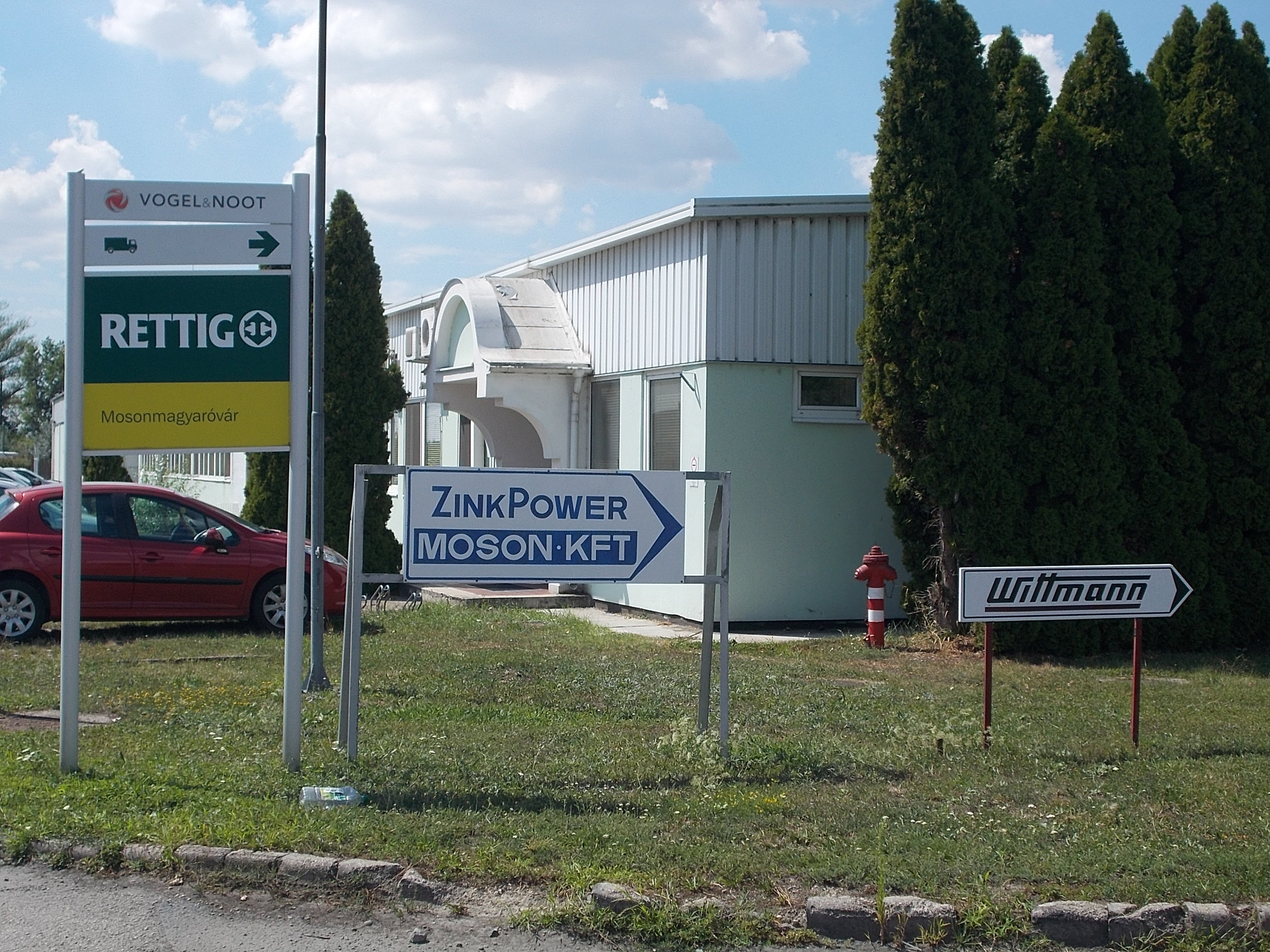
Rettig Hungary in Mosonmagyaróvár

Rettig ICC is a shortened name for Rettig Indoor Climate Comfort. Myson Radiators, owned by Rettig ICC, is the second-largest manufacturer of radiators in the UK market, incorporated in March 1960, and have a factory in Gateshead on the Team Valley estate. It has its UK distribution centre on the Drum Industrial Estate, off the A693, in the north of Chester-le-Street in North Lodge in County Durham, east of Pelton. Rettig ICC is also the owner of Purmo radiators, the UK's fourth largest radiator manufacturer.

Rettig Ireland is in Newcastle West, which has a valve factory. Rettig Germany is in Vienenburg in Lower Saxony.

It owns Vogel & Noot of Sankt Barbara im Mürztal in Austria and Finimetal of Villepinte in the north of Paris. Perttu Louhiluoto (Finnish, and a former director of Metso) is the Chief Executive since January 2018, who replaced Neil MacPherson, who had replaced Markus Lengauer and was a former managing Director of Rettig UK.

== Products ==
- Myson radiators
- Purmo radiators
- Vogel & Noot radiators

== See also ==
- Hans Sohlström, Chief Executive of Rettig Group
