= Kościan County =

Kościan County Powiat kościański
- County
- Flag Coat of arms

- Location within the voivodeship
- Coordinates (Kościan): 52°5′N 16°39′E
- Country: Poland
- Voivodeship: Greater Poland
- Seat: Kościan
- Gminas: Total 5 (incl. 1 urban): Kościan; Gmina Czempiń; Gmina Kościan; Gmina Krzywiń; Gmina Śmigiel

Area
  - Total: 722.53 km^{2} (278.97 sq mi)

Population (2006)
  - Total: 77,760
  - Density: 107.6/km^{2} (278.7/sq mi)
  - Urban: 36,236
  - Rural: 41,524
- Car plates: PKS
- Website: www.powiatkoscian.pl

Kościan County (Polish: powiat kościański) is a unit of territorial administration and local government (powiat) in Greater Poland Voivodeship, west-central Poland. It came into being on January 1, 1999, as a result of the Polish local government reforms passed in 1998. Its administrative seat and largest town is Kościan, which lies 40 kilometres (25 mi) south-west of the regional capital Poznań. The county contains three other towns: Śmigiel, 13 km (8 mi) south-west of Kościan, Czempiń, 13 km (8 mi) north-east of Kościan, and Krzywiń, 18 km (11 mi) south-east of Kościan.

The county covers an area of 722.53 square kilometres (279.0 sq mi). As of 2006 its total population is 77,760, out of which the population of Kościan is 24,102, that of Śmigiel is 5,452, that of Czempiń is 5,135, that of Krzywiń is 1,547, and the rural population is 41,524.

== Neighbouring counties ==
Kościan County is bordered by Poznań County to the north, Śrem County to the east, Gostyń County to the south-east, Leszno County to the south, Wolsztyn County to the west and Grodzisk County to the north-west.

== Administrative divisions ==
The county is subdivided into five gminas (one urban, three urban-rural and one rural). These are listed in the following table, in descending order of population.

Gmina	Type	Area (km^{2})	Population (2006)	Seat
Kościan	urban	8.8	24,102	
Gmina Śmigiel	urban-rural	189.9	17,465	Śmigiel
Gmina Kościan	rural	202.3	15,042	Kościan *
Gmina Czempiń	urban-rural	142.5	11,259	Czempiń
Gmina Krzywiń	urban-rural	179.2	9,892	Krzywiń
* seat not part of the gmina
