= National road 32 (Poland) =

National road in Poland

Coordinates: 52°05′43″N 15°41′15″E

National Road 32
- Droga krajowa nr 32

Route information
- Maintained by GDDKiA
- Length: 157 km (98 mi)
- Existed: 1986–present

Major junctions
- From: Gubinek (PL-D border)
- see Route plan section
- To: Stęszew

Location
- Country: Poland
- Regions: Lubusz Voivodeship; Greater Poland Voivodeship
- Major cities: Zielona Góra

Highway system
- National roads in Poland; Voivodeship roads
← DK 31	→ DK 33

Droga krajowa nr 32 (translates from Polish as national road 32) is route that is part of the Polish national roads network. It runs through Lubusz and Greater Poland Voivodeships, leading from the former border crossing with Germany in Gubinek to Stęszew, where meets national road 5. Locally act as a bypass for small towns through the route. For a 14 km stretch it runs on the route of expressway S3. National road 32 connects Poznań urban area and Zielona Góra urban area with Polish-German border.

== Major towns along the route ==
- Gubinek, Polish-German border
- Gubin
- Krosno Odrzańskie
- Dąbie (national road 29)
- Zielona Góra (S3, national road 27)
- Sulechów (S3, national road 3)
- Wolsztyn
- Grodzisk Wielkopolski
- Stęszew (national road 5)

== Route plan ==
km	Icon	Name	Crossed roads
0		Polish-German former border crossing Gubinek — Klein Gastrose	Poland Germany
x		Gubin bypass	—
26		Brzózka	
x		Krosno Odrzańskie bypass	—
34		Dąbie	
49		Leśniów Wielki	
58		Roundabout in Zielona Góra	
x		Trasa Północna in Zielona Góra (northern bypass)	
67		Zielona Góra-Północna interchange	
x		National road 32 runs on express road S3 stretch (14 km)	
67		Sulechów- Kruszyna interchange	
x		Sulechów bypass	—
87		Kargowa	
92		Kopanica	—
107		Wolsztyn	
119		Rakoniewice	
130		Grodzisk Wielkopolski bypass	—
x		Highway strip Granowo	
144		Strykowo	
157		Stęszew	
x		National road 5 in direction to Poznań	
x		National road 5 in direction to Wrocław	
