= Łódź (disambiguation) =

Łódź is a city in central Poland.

Łódź may also refer to:

- Łódź (European Parliament constituency)
- Łódź Voivodeship
- Łódź, Gostyń County in Greater Poland Voivodeship (west-central Poland)
- Łódź, Poznań County in Greater Poland Voivodeship (west-central Poland)
