= Edmund Bojanowski =

Blessed Edmund Bojanowski
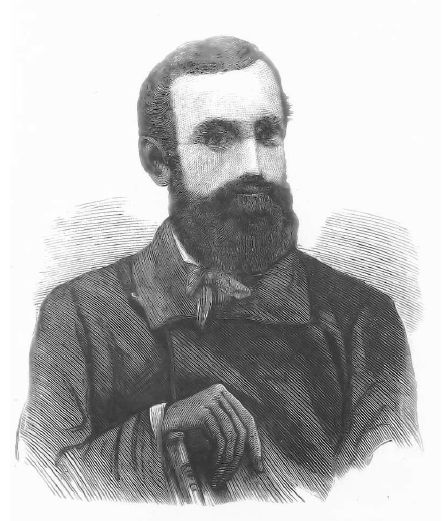
- Born: 14 November 1814; Grabonóg, Piaski, Gostyń, Duchy of Warsaw
- Died: 7 August 1871 (aged 56); Górka Duchowna, Lipno, Leszno, Congress Poland
- Venerated in: Roman Catholic Church
- Beatified: 13 June 1999, Warsaw, Poland by Pope John Paul II
- Feast: 7 August

Edmund Bojanowski (14 November 1814 - 7 August 1871) was a Polish Catholic layman who founded what became four religious congregations. His leadership role in the Society of St. Vincent de Paul led to his contemporaries famously nicknaming him the "second St. Vincent de Paul".

He studied art and literature during his education in Breslau and Berlin before distinguishing himself during a cholera epidemic in which he tended to the ill. Bojanowski founded several orphanages and libraries for the poor and even worked in them to provide for those people. But his main desire was to enter the priesthood: ill health blocked this once and his own death prevented his second attempt after his deteriorating health forced him to stop his ecclesial studies.

His beatification cause opened decades after his death and culminated on 13 June 1999 after Pope John Paul II beatified him in Warsaw on the occasion of his apostolic visit to the nation.

== Life ==
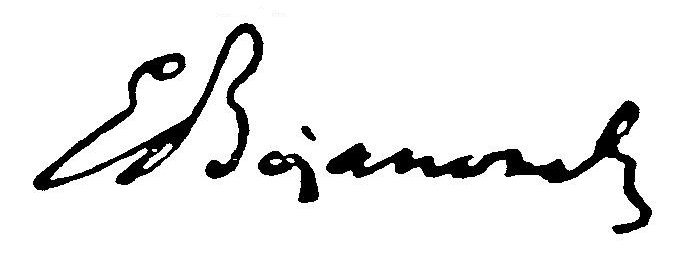
Bojanowski's signature.

Edmund Bojanowski was born in Poland on 14 November 1814 to the hereditary nobles (szlachta) Walenty Bojanowski and Teresa Umińska. Both his parents were devout in their faith, which proved a critical influence on his deep religious convictions formed from childhood.

In 1819 he became ill and appeared to die but seemed to return to life a short while later despite doctors declaring that there were slim chances the child would recover. His parents considered this a form of miraculous healing based on their constant petitions for intercession from above. It was upon his recuperation that the child vowed to dedicate his life to the Blessed Mother. Bojanowski continued to suffer ill health throughout his lifetime and it was due to this that he could not attend school and had to be tutored at home. In 1835 he developed tuberculosis during the course of his education.

He later continued his studies at the Breslau college (1832-35; where he studied art and literature) and also at the college in Berlin (1836-38; studied art and music but did not complete his philosophical studies). But Bojanowski was far too frail at this time to join the priesthood.

Bojanowski also translated works from Serbian to Polish during this time. The current period proved one of cultural change and exploration to which he himself contributed through the publication of a historical account of Serbia as well as a contribution of his own poems. He was known to spend hours in Eucharistic adoration and often meditated on Sacred Scripture. He made his Confession once a week and made annual retreats in order to undergo the Spiritual Exercises.

His interest in people led him to collect stories as well as songs and proverbs from the rural areas and publish them in "The Friend of the People". Bojanowski also became involved in providing books for schools as well as establishing new libraries and creating orphanages for poor children. During the cholera epidemic during the period 1848-49 he tended to the sick while helping to medicate and comfort them. Due to the rampant sickness he saw around him he helped organize a new hospital (Dom Miłosierdzia). He helped to fund hospices and orphanages.

His leadership role in the Society of St. Vincent de Paul led to his contemporaries famously nicknaming him the "second St. Vincent de Paul". He deemed service to the poor as an important task and due to this was able to found a religious order of nuns known as called the Congregation of the Sisters Servants of the Immaculate Conception of the Virgin Mother of God. This later led to the creation of separate religious orders in Poznań as well as other cities such as Wrocław. In 1867, he authorized the founding of the Poor Servants of the Mother of God, which Mother Magdalen of the Sacred Heart led in England.

Bojanowski later decided to seek the priesthood once more in 1869 in Gniezno, but his health continued to deteriorate to the point where he later died 7 August 1871 in Górka Duchowna without being ordained.

== Religious orders ==
Bojanowski either founded or co-founded what became four separate religious congregations:

- Sisters Servants of Mary Immaculate
- Sisters Servants of the Holy and Immaculate Virgin Mary
- Little Servant Sisters of the Immaculate Conception
- Sisters Servants of the Mother of God

== Beatification ==
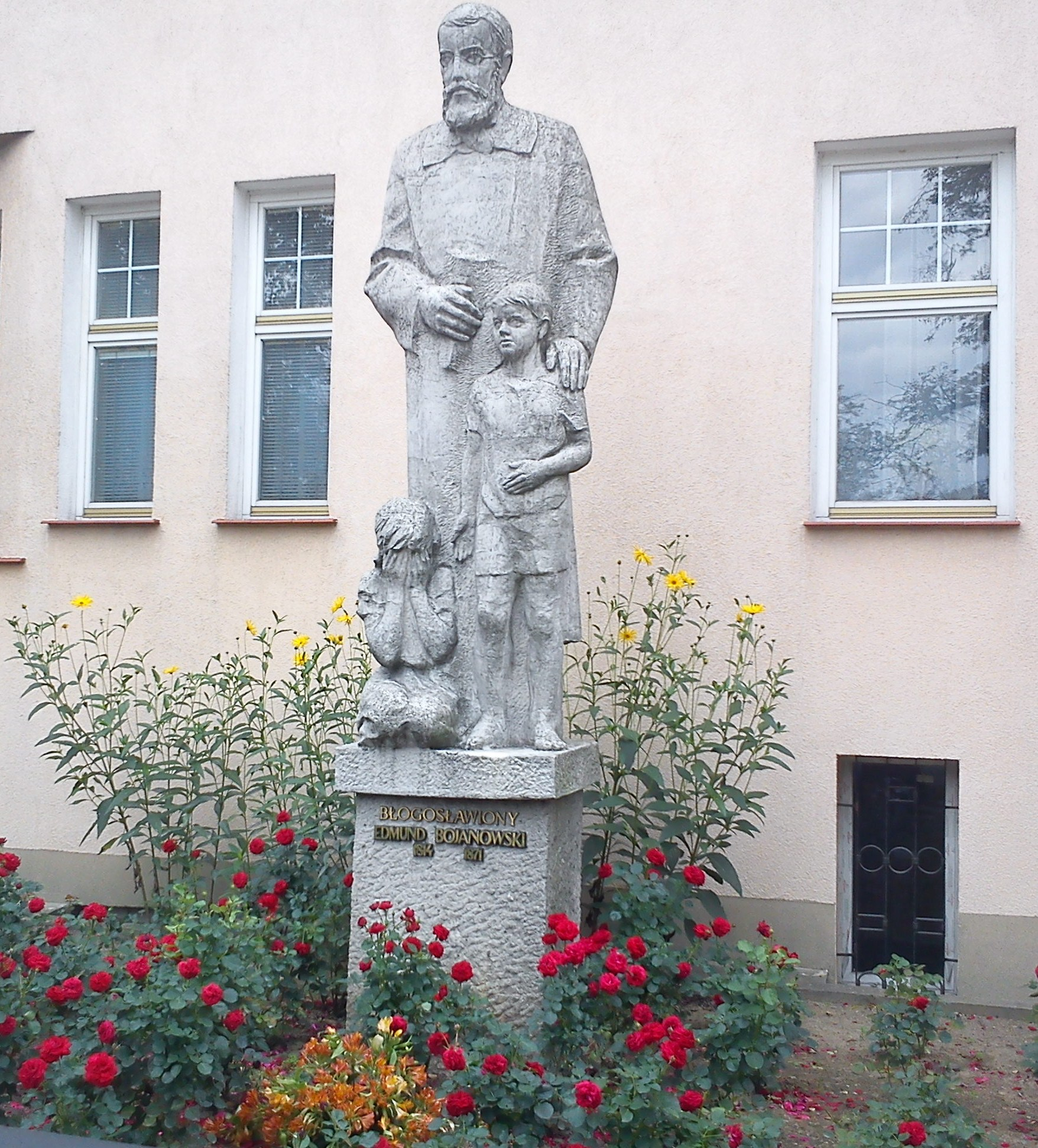
Monument in Luboń-Żabikowo.

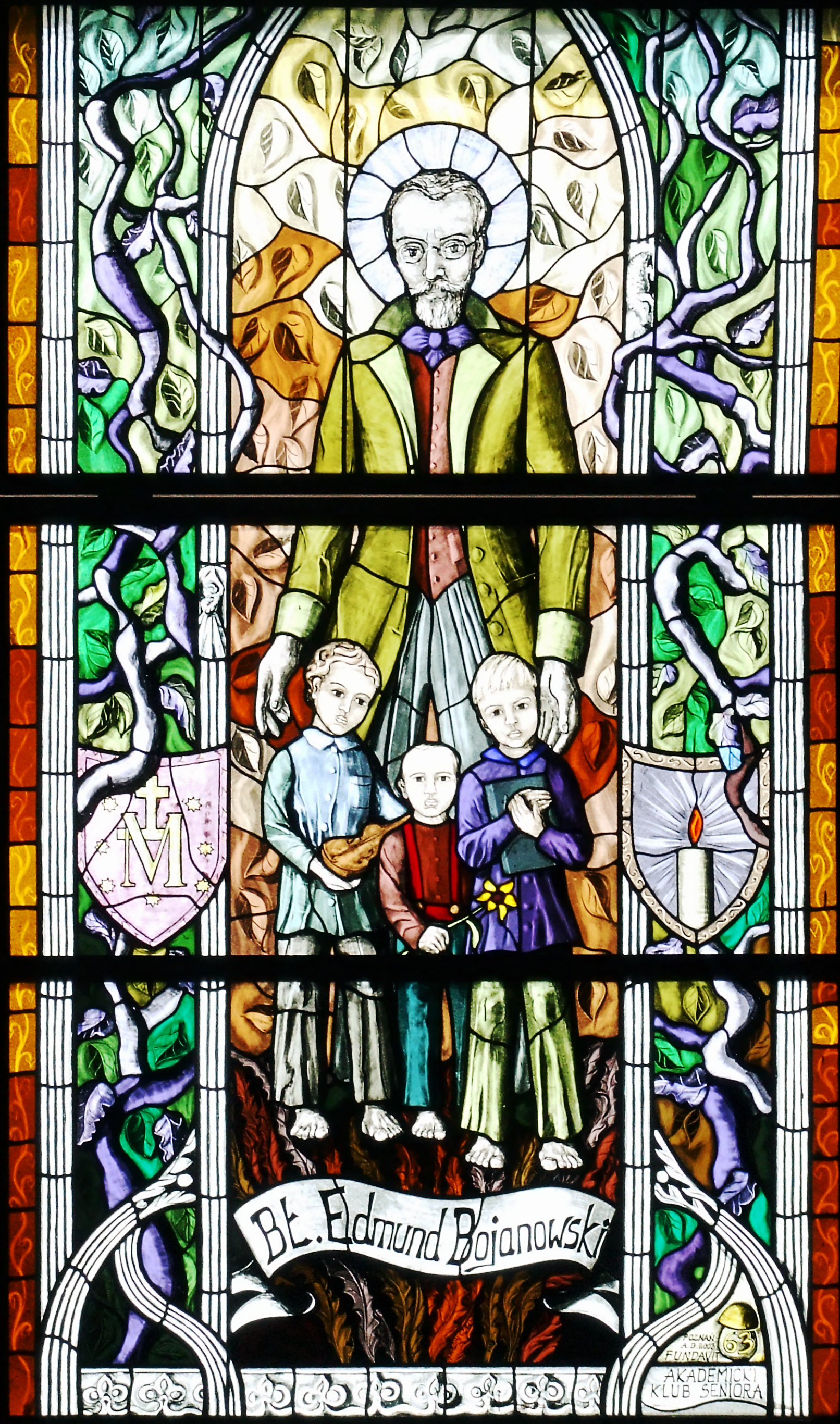
Stained glass window in the Saint Adalbert church in Poznań.

The beatification process opened in Poznań some decades after his death and was closed at a solemn Mass that Archbishop Antoni Baraniak led on 24 October 1960. The Congregation for the Causes of Saints granted their validation to this diocesan investigation on 8 March 1991 prior to receiving the Positio dossier for additional assessment later in 1996. Historians advising the C.C.S. confirmed their approval to the cause on 22 October 1996 as did the congress of theologians on 16 December 1997. The C.C.S. members also voiced their approval some months later on 21 April 1998. Pope John Paul II declared Bojanowski as Venerable on 3 July 1998 after confirming his heroic virtue.

Bojanowski was beatified following papal recognition of a miracle (a healing) attributed to his intercession. The investigation into the alleged miracle took place in the diocese of its origin prior to that investigation receiving the needed validation from the C.C.S. on 15 October 1993. Medical experts confirmed the miraculous nature of the healing on 4 June 1998 as did theologians months later on 9 October and the C.C.S. members later that 15 December. John Paul II granted final approval for the miracle less than a week later on 21 December.

John Paul II beatified Bojanowski in Warsaw on 13 June 1999 during his apostolic visit to Poland. The pope - during the beatification itself - referred to Bojanowski as "A good man with a big heart who for love of God and neighbor was able to bring different sectors together, effectively rallying them around a common good" whose apostolate was "an exceptional example of generous and industrious work for man, the homeland and the church."

== See also ==
- Frances Margaret Taylor
- Marcelina Darowska
- Poor Servants of the Mother of God
- Chronological list of saints and blesseds in the 19th century
- List of people beatified by Pope John Paul II
- Church of Our Lady of Perpetual Help in Tarnobrzeg
- Parish of Our Lady of Perpetual Help in Tarnobrzeg
- Tarnobrzeg
