= Gmina Piaski =

Gmina Piaski may refer to either of the following administrative districts in Poland:

- Gmina Piaski, Greater Poland Voivodeship
- Gmina Piaski, Lublin Voivodeship
