= Piotr Tomicki =

Roman Catholic bishop

- Bishop of Kraków
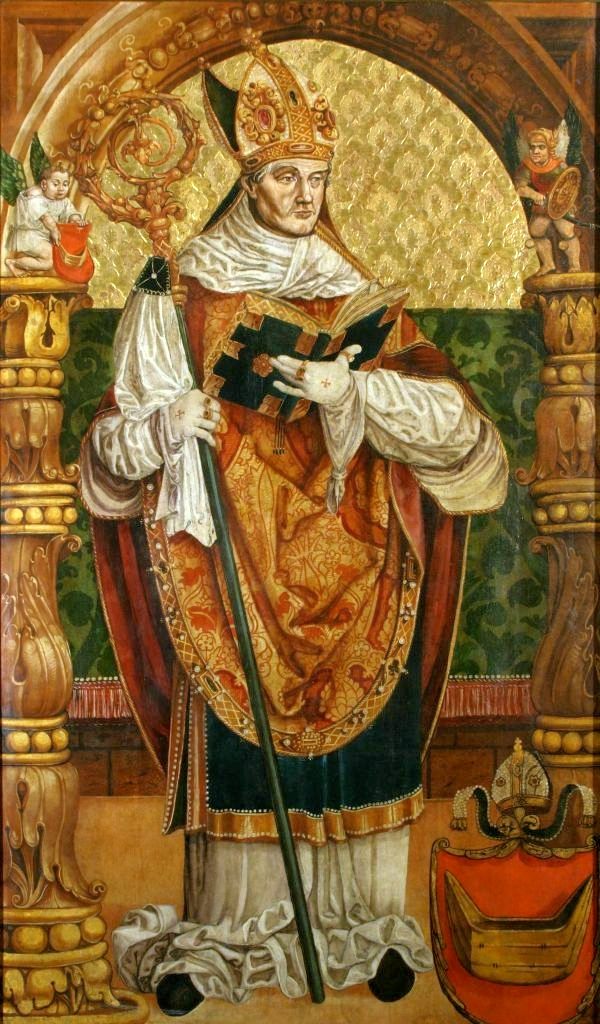
- Church: Catholic Church
- Diocese: Diocese of Kraków
- In office: 9 December 1523 – October 1535
- Predecessor: Jan Konarski
- Successor: Jan Latalski
- Previous posts: Bishop of Poznań (1520-1523); Bishop of Przemyśl (1514-1520)

Orders
- Ordination: 1511
- Consecration: 18 February 1515 by Jan Konarski

Personal details
- Born: 1464 Tomice, Kingdom of Poland
- Died: 19 October 1535 (aged 70–71) Kraków, Kingdom of Poland

Piotr Tomicki (1464 – 19 October 1535) was a Roman Catholic Bishop of Przemyśl and Poznań, Archbishop of Kraków, Vice-Chancellor of the Crown, and Royal Secretary. Celebrated as one of the most important representatives of the Polish Renaissance, he studied in Italy, was part of the court of the nobleman and bishop Jan Lubrański, and had contacts with many of the enlightened minds of Europe, including Erasmus of Rotterdam.

Tomicki was a generous patron of artists, particularly sculptors. His collection of sculptures from between 1520 and 1530 was rivalled only by that of the king. He also presided over changes at the Jagiellonian University, which created a department of Roman Law, and introduced the teaching of Greek and Hebrew. Under his guidance Stanisław Górski wrote Acta Tomiciana, a collection of documents from the time of Tomicki's service as chancellor.

== Life ==
Tomicki was born in 1464 near Poznań, the son of Mikołaj of Tomice, a Chorąży (standard-bearer) from Poznań, and Anna of Szamotuły. After his father's death in 1478, he went to the court of his uncle, Andrzej Szamotuły, then governor of Poznań. He studied at the cathedral school in Gniezno, before moving to Leipzig around 1486, and shortly after to the Kraków Academy, where he earned his bachelor's degree in 1490, and his magistrature in philosophy three years later in 1493. That same year he travelled to Bologna to study law, finishing his doctorate in 1500.

Immediately after graduation he began working in the Roman Curia, becoming chancellor of Cardinal Fryderyk Jagiellończyk, who gave him a number of ecclesiastical benefices, including the archdeaconry of Kraków, despite Piotr's not being a clergyman. After the death of Cardinal Fryderyk, Piotr went to the court of Jan Lubrański, the bishop of Poznań, where he remained between 1503 and 1506. Then he went to the office of the crown of King Sigismund I the Old, in whose service as secretary he repeatedly traveled as envoy to Hungary, Wallachia, and Pomerania.

In 1511 Piotr was ordained a priest, and in 1514 he was consecrated Bishop of Przemyśl. One year later he became Vice-Chancellor of the Crown, an office which he held until his death. In 1515, together with Chancellor Krzysztof Szydłowiecki, he became the main benefactor of a settlement with the Habsburgs. After the death of Jan Lubrański in 1520, he became bishop in Poznań and renounced the bishopric of Przemyśl. He resided in Wielkopolska for a while, devoting his time to politics and working for the royal court. In 1525, he became bishop of Kraków, while still bishop of Poznań, as well as Apostolic Nuncio, and collector of papal tributes. In 1526 he abdicated his position as bishop in Poznań. In that same year he conducted an amicable agreement between the king and Albert Hohenzollern. Tomicki served as both Bishop of Kraków and Vice-Chancellor of the Crown from 1525, which was inconsistent with the Polish law of Incompatibilitas. It was one of the main reasons for opposition near Szydłowiec during the Execution movement.

Piotr Tomicki died in Kraków on 19 October 1535. He was buried in Wawel Cathedral in a chapel that he himself founded.

He is one of the characters on the famous painting by Jan Matejko, Prussian Homage.

== See also ==
- Bishop Tomicki′s Missal
