= Drogoszewo =

Drogoszewo may refer to the following places:

- Drogoszewo, Greater Poland Voivodeship (west-central Poland)
- Drogoszewo, Masovian Voivodeship (east-central Poland)
- Drogoszewo, Podlaskie Voivodeship (north-east Poland)
