= Rakoniewice =

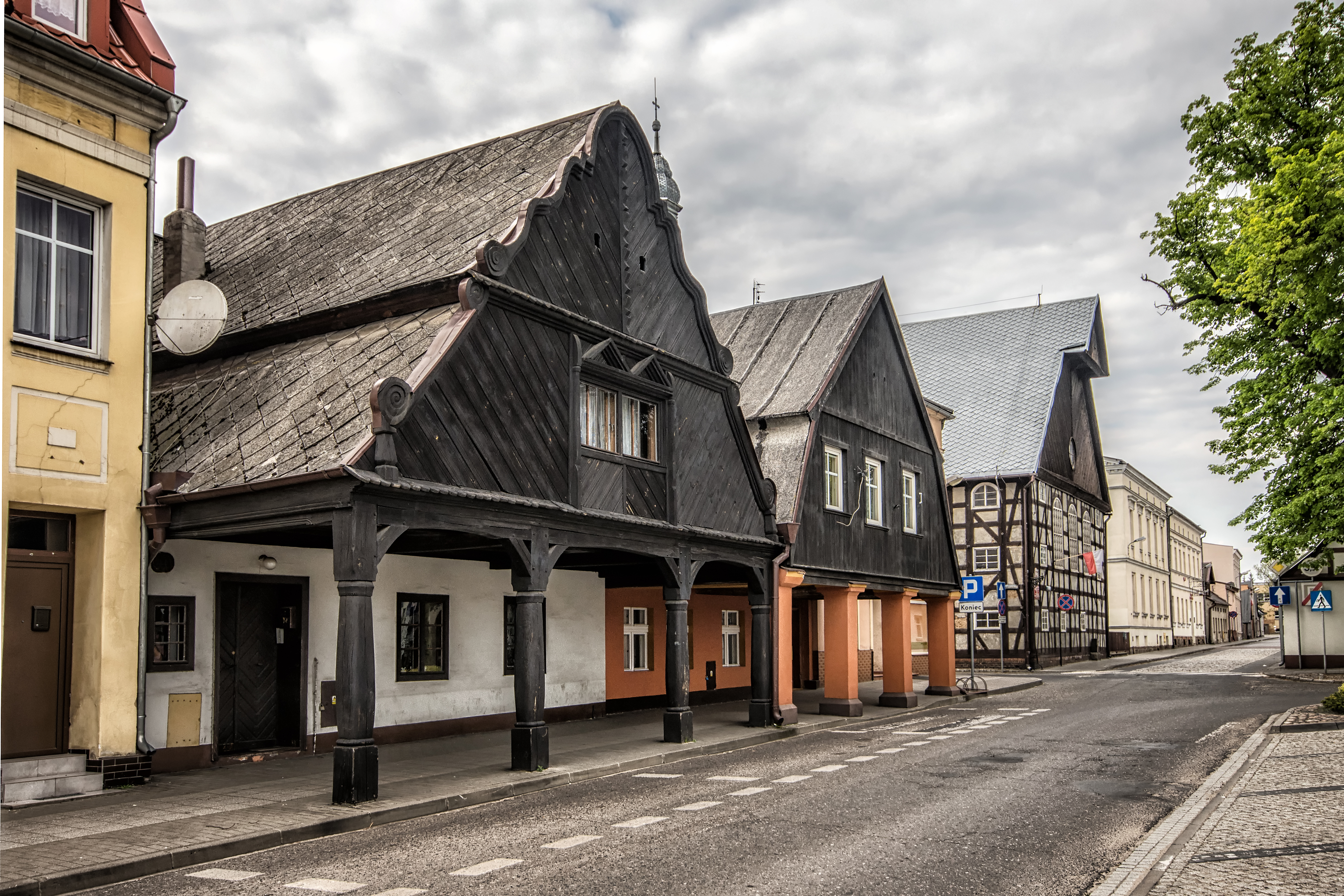
- 18th-century arcaded houses near Market Square

- Flag Coat of arms

- Location within Poland
- Coordinates: 52°8′27″N 16°16′23″E
- Country: Poland
- Voivodeship: Greater Poland
- County: Grodzisk
- Gmina: Rakoniewice
- First mentioned: 1252
- Town rights: 1662

Area
  - Total: 3.4 km^{2} (1.3 sq mi)

Population (2010)
  - Total: 3,332
  - Density: 980/km^{2} (2,500/sq mi)
- Time zone: UTC+1 (CET)
  - Summer (DST): UTC+2 (CEST)
- Postal code: 62-067
- Vehicle registration: PGO
- Website: http://www.rakoniewice.pl/

Rakoniewice [rakɔɲɛˈvʲit͡sɛ] is a town located in Grodzisk County, within Greater Poland Voivodeship, in western Poland. The population as of 2010 was 3,332 inhabitants. The town's historic core with its urban layout comprising 18th-century arcaded houses is registered as a Cultural Heritage Monument under protection.

== History ==
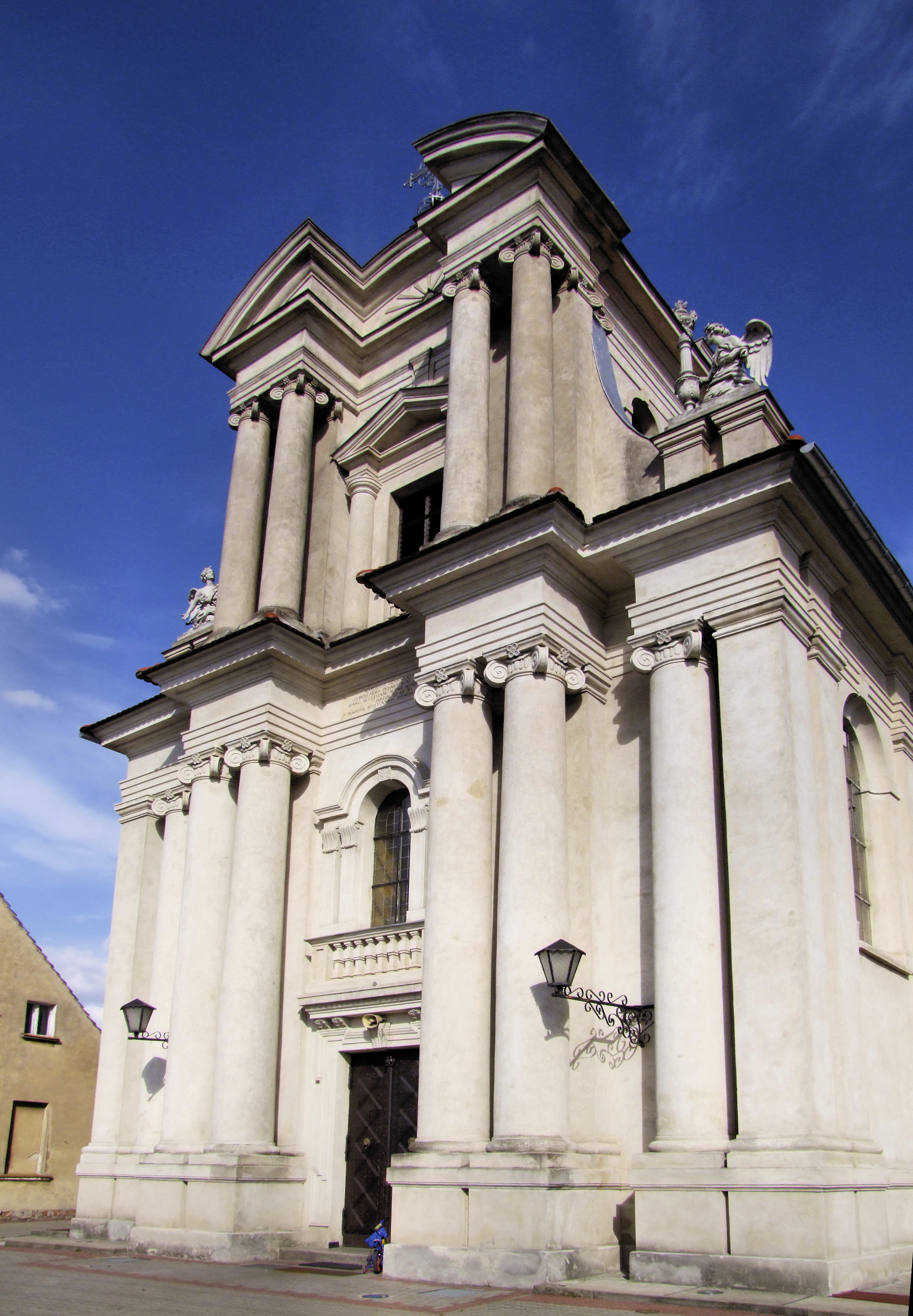
Saints Martin and Stanislaus church

As part of the region of Greater Poland, i.e. the cradle of the Polish state, the area formed part of Poland since its establishment in the 10th century. The settlement was recorded in 1252 and named after the komes of Greater Poland, Rakoń. It was a private village of Polish nobility, administratively located in the Kościan County in the Poznań Voivodeship in the Greater Poland Province of the Kingdom of Poland. It received town rights in 1662 through the efforts of voivode of Poznań Krzysztof Grzymułtowski. In the 17th century Rakoniewice was associated with the settlement of so-called dissenters who favored property owners. The town became a center of crafts.

The town was annexed by Prussia in the Second Partition of Poland in 1793. Following the successful Greater Poland uprising of 1806, it was regained by Poles and included within the short-lived Duchy of Warsaw. After the duchy's dissolution in 1815, it was re-annexed by Prussia, and from 1871 it was also part of Germany under the Germanized name Rakwitz. In the years 1869–1872 Robert Koch, a German microbiologist and later Nobel laureate, conducted his first medical practice in the town.

In the years 1901–1906 the town was the scene of school strikes of Polish children opposing Germanisation. On January 3, 1919, Rakoniewice was captured by Polish insurgents during the Greater Poland uprising against Germany, and then reintegrated with Poland, which regained independence several weeks prior. Following the joint German-Soviet invasion of Poland, which started World War II in September 1939, the town was occupied by Germany until 1945.

Until 1975 the town was located in the Wolsztyn County. In 1975–1998 it belonged to the Poznań Voivodeship.

Despite the historical, geographical, economic reasons to merge with the reconstituted Wolsztyn County in 1999 and opposition of local residents of the villages for a better location for Wolsztyn, Rakoniewice joined the Grodzisk County.

== Demographics ==
Historical population

Year	Pop.	±%
1871	2,019	—
1880	2,136	+5.8%
1890	2,201	+3.0%
1900	2,065	−6.2%
1910	2,173	+5.2%
1921	2,013	−7.4%

Year	Pop.	±%
1931	2,015	+0.1%
1939	2,183	+8.3%
1950	1,761	−19.3%
1960	2,062	+17.1%
2010	3,332	+61.6%

== Sights ==
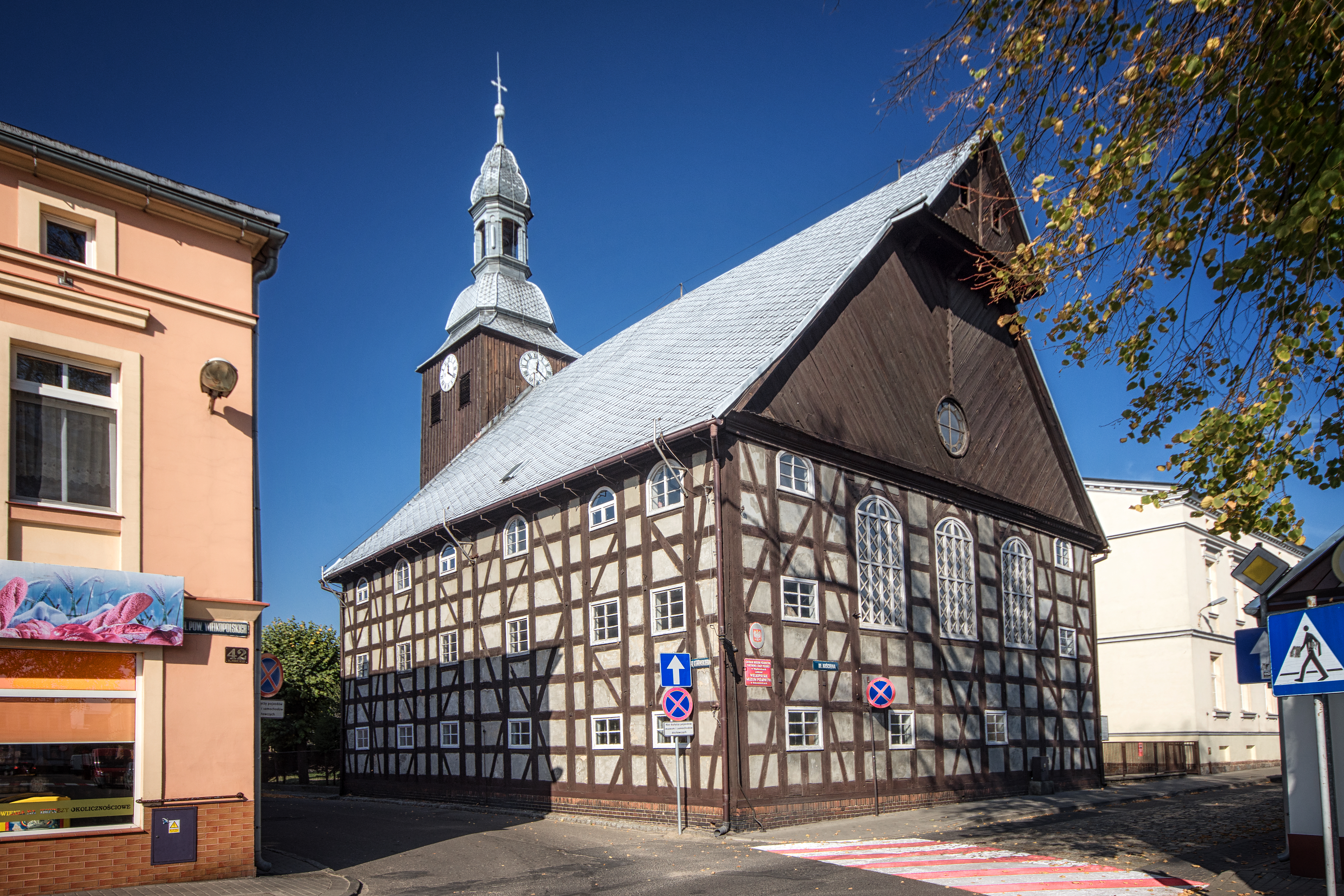
Fire Service Museum, formerly a church

- Timbered church from the 18th century, now Greater Fire Service Museum
- Arcaded houses from the 18th - 19th century
- Eclectic palace from the 19th century

== Transport ==
The Polish National road No. 32 (Stęszew-Wolsztyn-Zielona Góra-Gubin) runs through the town, as well as the railway line No. 357 (Wolsztyn-Grodzisk Wielkopolski-Luboń-Poznań).
