= Rębowo =

Rębowo may refer to the following places:

- Rębowo, Gostyń County in Greater Poland Voivodeship (west-central Poland)
- Rębowo, Konin County in Greater Poland Voivodeship (west-central Poland)
- Rębowo, Masovian Voivodeship (east-central Poland)
- Rębowo, Lubusz Voivodeship (west Poland)
- Rębowo, Pomeranian Voivodeship (north Poland)
