= Smętówko =

Smętówko may refer to the following places in Poland:

- Smętówko, Greater Poland Voivodeship
- Smętówko, Pomeranian Voivodeship
