= Strzelce Wielkie =

Strzelce Wielkie may refer to the following places:

- Strzelce Wielkie, Greater Poland Voivodeship (west-central Poland)
- Strzelce Wielkie, Lesser Poland Voivodeship (south Poland)
- Strzelce Wielkie, Łódź Voivodeship (central Poland)
