= Piekary, Poznań County =

Piekary
- Village
- Location within Poland
- Coordinates: 52°18′N 16°34′E
- Country: Poland
- Voivodeship: Greater Poland
- County: Poznań
- Gmina: Stęszew

Piekary [pjɛˈkarɨ] is a village in the administrative district of Gmina Stęszew, within Poznań County, Greater Poland Voivodeship, in west-central Poland.
