= Trzebaw, Greater Poland Voivodeship =

Trzebaw
- Village
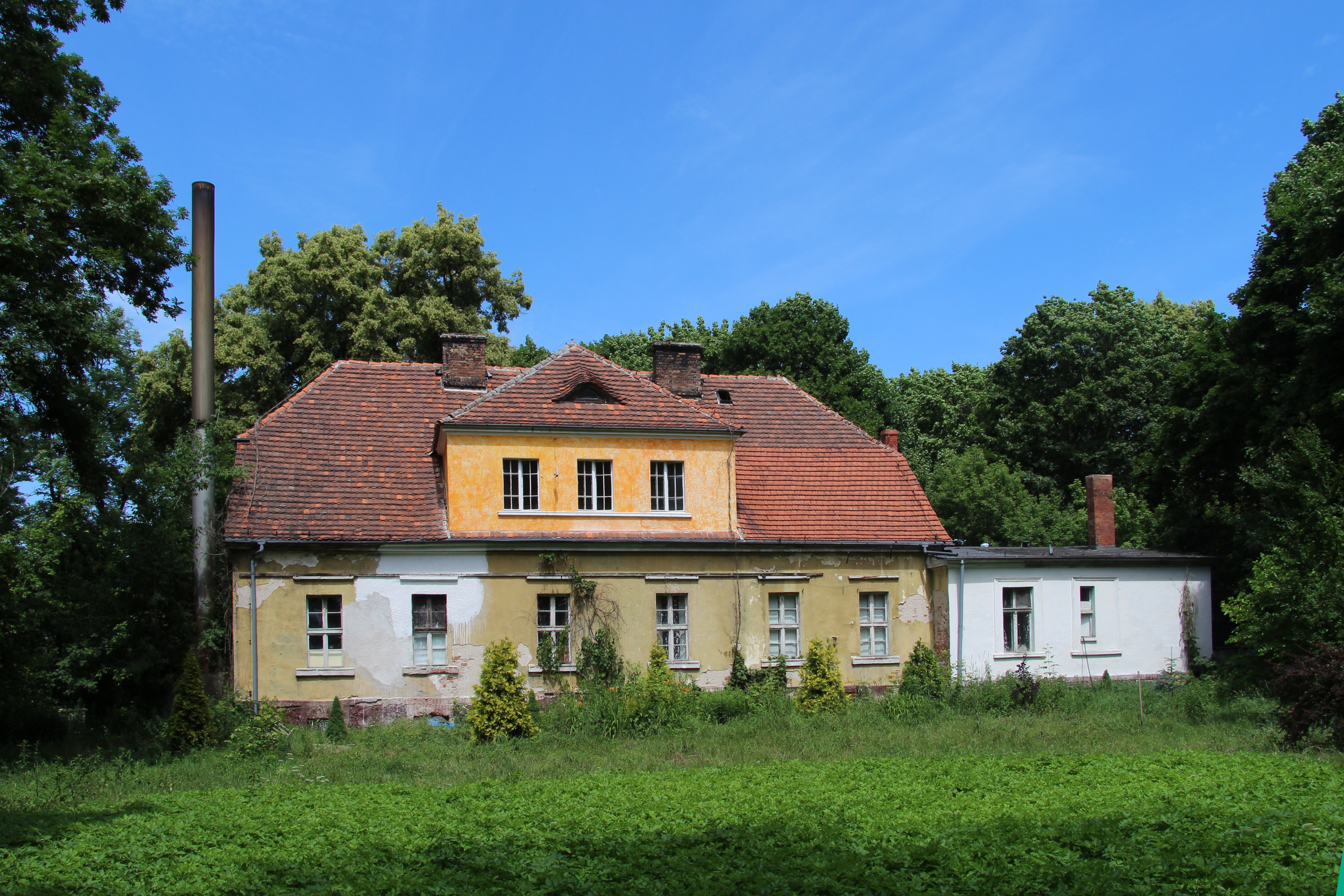
- Manor house

- Location within Poland
- Coordinates: 52°17′N 16°46′E
- Country: Poland
- Voivodeship: Greater Poland
- County: Poznań
- Gmina: Stęszew
- Population: 612

Trzebaw [ˈtʂɛbaf] is a village in the administrative district of Gmina Stęszew, within Poznań County, Greater Poland Voivodeship, in west-central Poland.
