= Bishop Tomicki's Missal =

Liturgical book from 1532

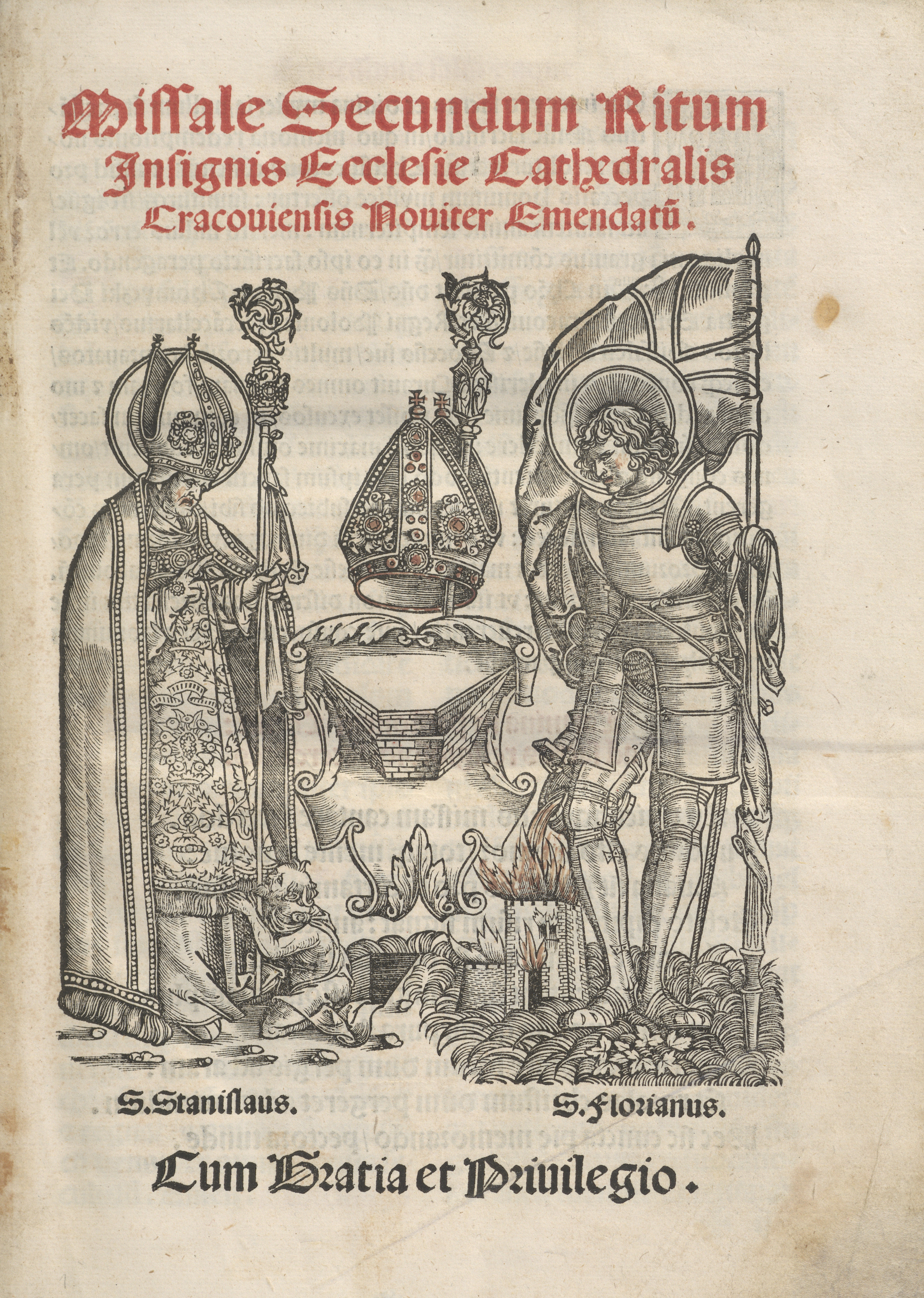
- Original title: Missale secundum ritum insignis ecclesie cathedralis Cracouiensis
- Language: Latin
- Genre: missal
- Publisher: Peter Liechtenstein
- Publication date: 1532
- Pages: 388

Bishop Tomicki's Missal is a printed missal from 1532.

The missal was published in 1532 in Venice by Peter Liechtenstein for the diocese of Kraków in Poland and was compiled at the request of Bishop Piotr Tomicki. The most important elements of the Roman Catholic liturgy were the same everywhere, but some local differences existed such as additional prayers or a different calendar of saints, so this gave rise to the need to develop diocesan missals. One of the copies was in the Tarnowski collection in Dzików Castle in Tarnobrzeg in Poland. The National Library of Poland purchased the Dzików library in 2009. From May 2024, a copy of the missal is presented at a permanent exhibition in the Palace of the Commonwealth.

The book contains 388 leaves in folio format and musical notation. It is printed in red and black. On the title page there is a woodcut depicting saints Stanislaus and Florian.

== Bibliography ==
- Makowski, Tomasz; Sapała, Patryk, eds. (2024). The Palace of the Commonwealth. Three times opened. Treasures from the National Library of Poland at the Palace of the Commonwealth. Warsaw: National Library of Poland.
