= Michałowo, Gostyń County =

Michałowo
- Village
- Location within Poland
- Coordinates: 51°53′15″N 17°7′55″E
- Country: Poland
- Voivodeship: Greater Poland
- County: Gostyń
- Gmina: Piaski
- Population: 390

Michałowo [mixaˈwɔvɔ] is a village in the administrative district of Gmina Piaski, within Gostyń County, Greater Poland Voivodeship, in west-central Poland.
