= Bodzewko Drugie =

- Village
- Location within Poland
- Coordinates: 51°50′7″N 17°4′28″E
- Country: Poland
- Voivodeship: Greater Poland
- County: Gostyń
- Gmina: Piaski

Bodzewko Drugie [bɔˈd͡zɛfkɔ ˈdruɡʲɛ] is a village in the administrative district of Gmina Piaski, within Gostyń County, Greater Poland Voivodeship, in west-central Poland.
