= Szelejewo Drugie =

- Village
- Location within Poland
- Coordinates: 51°51′38″N 17°9′41″E
- Country: Poland
- Voivodeship: Greater Poland
- County: Gostyń
- Gmina: Piaski
- Elevation: 127 m (417 ft)
- Population: 746

Szelejewo Drugie [ʂɛlɛˈjɛvɔ ˈdruɡʲɛ] is a village in the administrative district of Gmina Piaski, within Gostyń County, Greater Poland Voivodeship, in west-central Poland.
