= Będlewo =

- Village
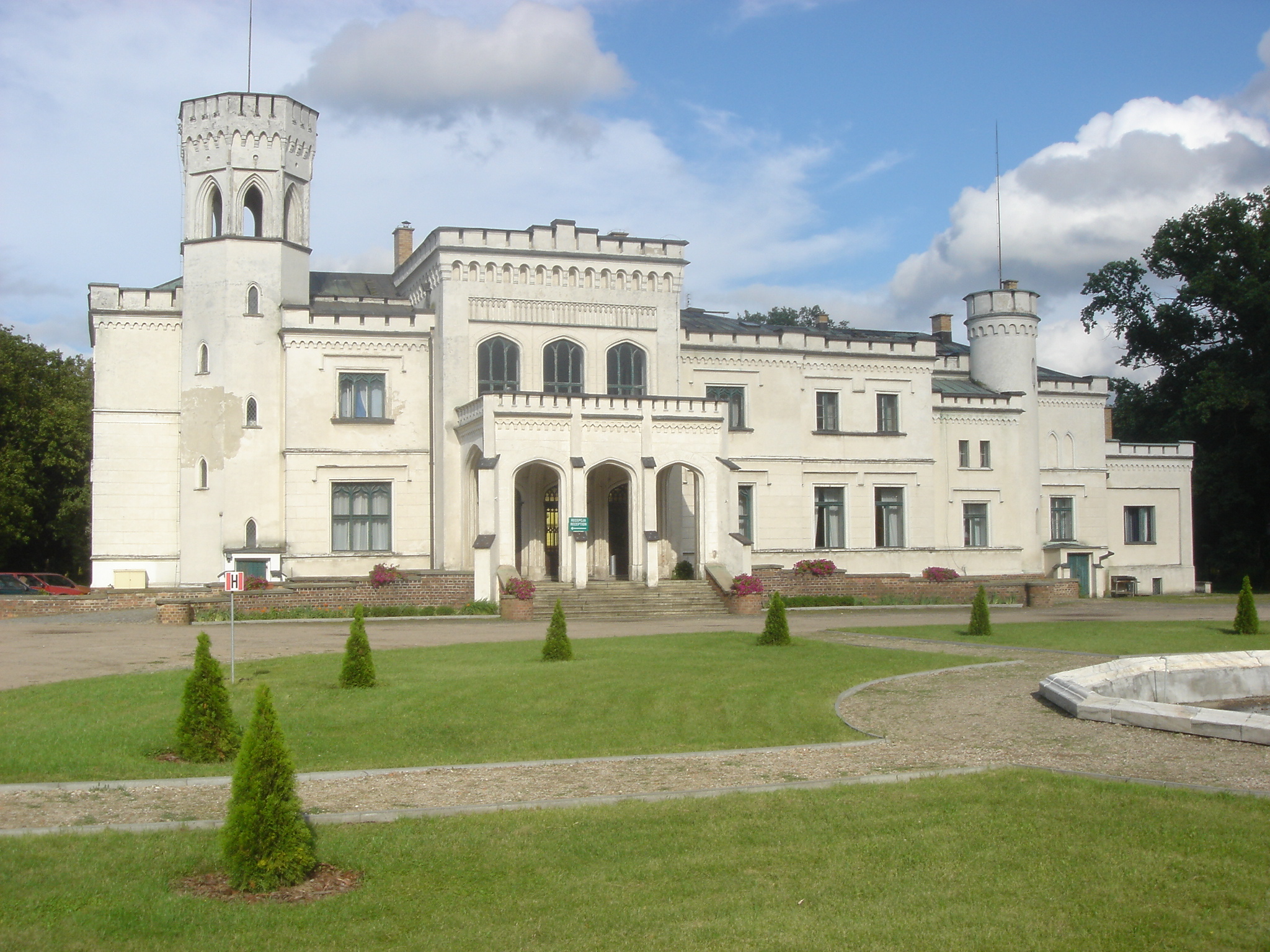
- Mathematical conference centre

- Location within Poland
- Coordinates: 52°14′N 16°42′E
- Country: Poland
- Voivodeship: Greater Poland
- County: Poznań
- Gmina: Stęszew

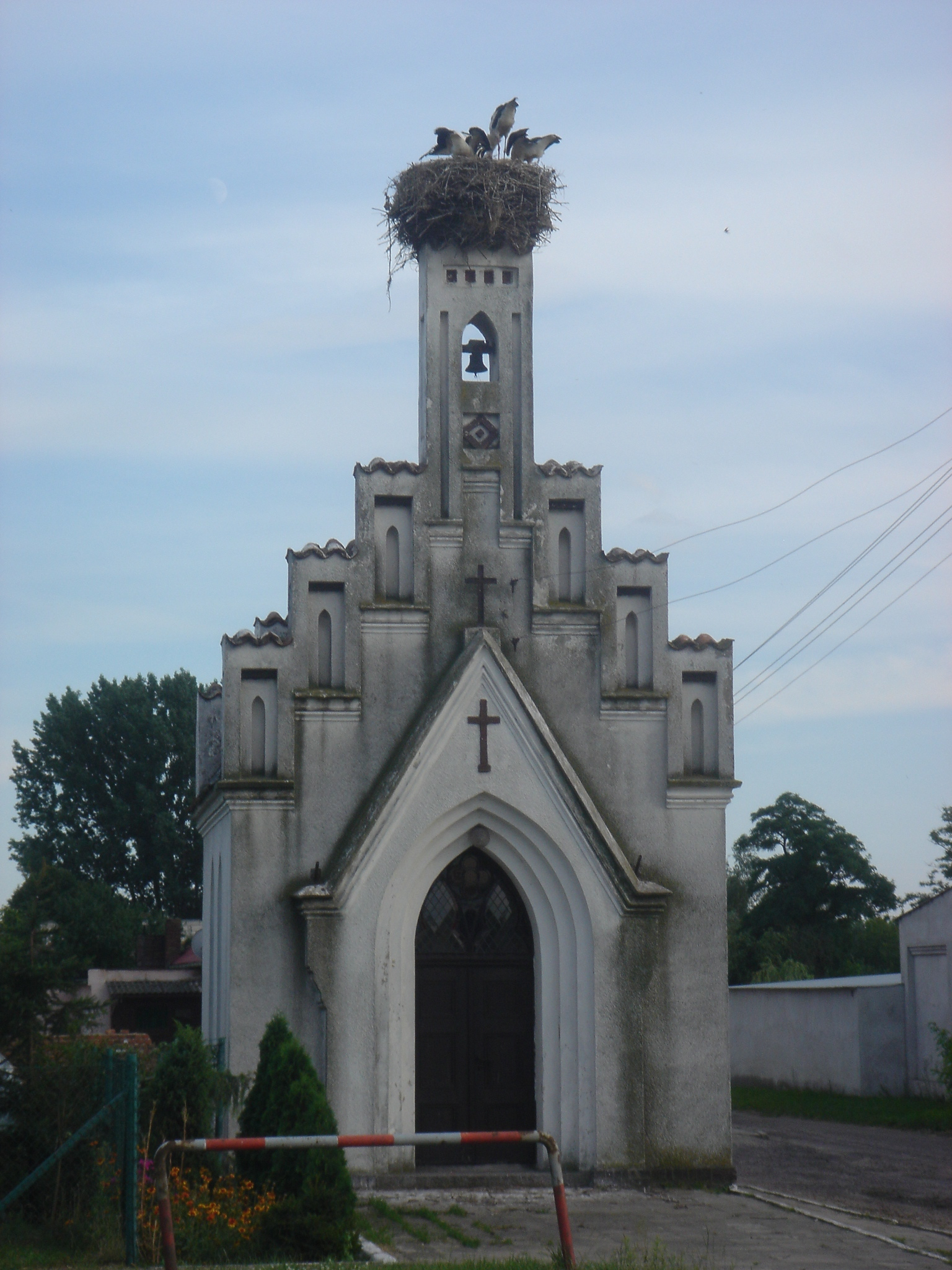
A storks' nest in Będlewo

Będlewo [bɛnˈdlɛvɔ] is a village in the administrative district of Gmina Stęszew, within Poznań County, Greater Poland Voivodeship, in west-central Poland.

It is the location of the Mathematical Research and Conference Center of the Institute of Mathematics of the Polish Academy of Sciences.
