= Józefowo, Gostyń County =

Józefowo
- Village
- Location within Poland
- Coordinates: 51°51′43″N 17°8′4″E
- Country: Poland
- Voivodeship: Greater Poland
- County: Gostyń
- Gmina: Piaski

Józefowo (Polish pronunciation: [juzɛˈfɔvɔ]) is a village in the administrative district of Gmina Piaski, within Gostyń County, Greater Poland Voivodeship, in west-central Poland.
