= Podrzecze, Greater Poland Voivodeship =

Podrzecze
- Village
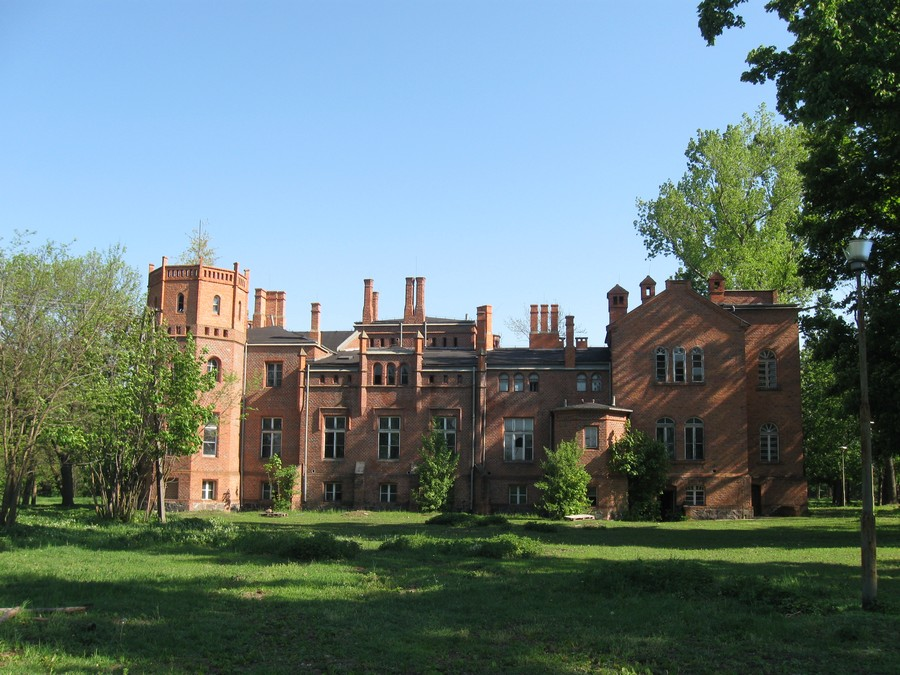

- Location within Poland
- Coordinates: 51°52′N 17°2′E
- Country: Poland
- Voivodeship: Greater Poland
- County: Gostyń
- Gmina: Piaski
- Population: 284

Podrzecze [pɔˈdʐɛt͡ʂɛ] is a village in the administrative district of Gmina Piaski, within Gostyń County, Greater Poland Voivodeship, in west-central Poland.

Approximately 100 graves dating from ca. 12th century BC have been discovered near Podrzecze. Often the deceased were put on a pyre and in the grave the items he used in his life. Nearly 140 different types of items were found. There were also animal graves - it is one of six animal mass graves in Poland dating back to the Lusatian culture, including the only one in Poland for horses.
