= Anteczków =

- Village
- Location within Poland
- Coordinates: 51°50′12″N 17°8′59″E
- Country: Poland
- Voivodeship: Greater Poland
- County: Gostyń
- Gmina: Piaski

Anteczków [anˈtɛt͡ʂkuf] is a village in the administrative district of Gmina Piaski, within Gostyń County, Greater Poland Voivodeship, in west-central Poland.
