= Krąplewo =

- Settlement
- Location within Poland
- Coordinates: 52°17′21″N 16°43′23″E
- Country: Poland
- Voivodeship: Greater Poland
- County: Poznań
- Gmina: Stęszew

Krąplewo [krɔmˈplɛvɔ] is a settlement in the administrative district of Gmina Stęszew, within Poznań County, Greater Poland Voivodeship, in west-central Poland.
