= Bielawy Szelejewskie =

- Village
- Location within Poland
- Coordinates: 51°51′30″N 17°10′42″E
- Country: Poland
- Voivodeship: Greater Poland
- County: Gostyń
- Gmina: Piaski

Bielawy Szelejewskie (Polish pronunciation: [bjɛˈlavɨ ʂɛlɛˈjɛfskʲɛ]) is a village in the administrative district of Gmina Piaski, within Gostyń County, Greater Poland Voivodeship, in west-central Poland.
