= Drzęczewo Drugie =

- Village
- Location within Poland
- Coordinates: 51°53′28″N 17°3′16″E
- Country: Poland
- Voivodeship: Greater Poland
- County: Gostyń
- Gmina: Piaski

Drzęczewo Drugie [dʐɛnˈt͡ʂɛvɔ ˈdruɡʲɛ] is a village in the administrative district of Gmina Piaski, within Gostyń County, Greater Poland Voivodeship, in west-central Poland.
