= Lipie, Gostyń County =

Lipie
- Village
- Location within Poland
- Coordinates: 51°52′20″N 17°7′35″E
- Country: Poland
- Voivodeship: Greater Poland
- County: Gostyń
- Gmina: Piaski
- Population: 267

Lipie [ˈlipjɛ] is a village in the administrative district of Gmina Piaski, within Gostyń County, Greater Poland Voivodeship, in west-central Poland.
