= Wielka Wieś, Gmina Stęszew =

Wielka Wieś
- Village
- Location within Poland
- Coordinates: 52°17′24″N 16°40′3″E
- Country: Poland
- Voivodeship: Greater Poland
- County: Poznań
- Gmina: Stęszew
- Elevation: 120 m (390 ft)
- Population: 600

Wielka Wieś [ˈvjɛlka ˈvjɛɕ] is a village in the administrative district of Gmina Stęszew, within Poznań County, Greater Poland Voivodeship, in west-central Poland.
