= Zaparcin =

- Settlement
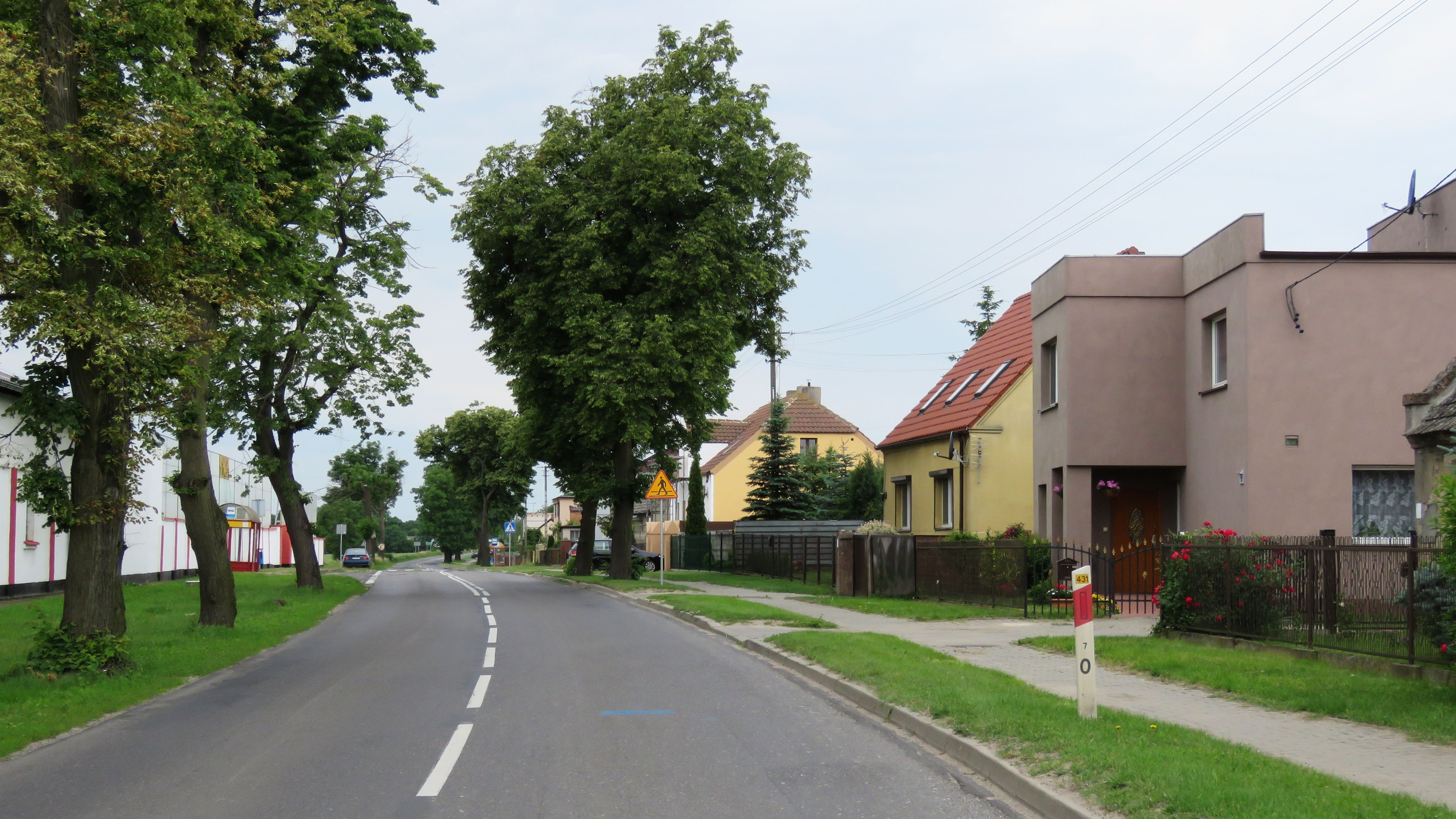

- Location within Poland
- Coordinates: 52°13′31″N 16°40′38″E
- Country: Poland
- Voivodeship: Greater Poland
- County: Poznań
- Gmina: Stęszew

Zaparcin [zaˈpart͡ɕin] is a settlement in the administrative district of Gmina Stęszew, within Poznań County, Greater Poland Voivodeship, in west-central Poland.
