= Gmina Stęszew =

Gmina Stęszew Stęszew Commune
- Gmina
- Coat of arms
- Interactive map of Gmina Stęszew
- Coordinates (Stęszew): 52°16′N 16°42′E
- Country: Poland
- Voivodeship: Greater Poland
- County: Poznań County
- Seat: Stęszew

Area
  - Total: 175.22 km^{2} (67.65 sq mi)

Population (2006)
  - Total: 13,919
  - Density: 79.437/km^{2} (205.74/sq mi)
  - Urban: 5,339
  - Rural: 8,580
- Website: http://www.steszew.pl/

Gmina Stęszew is an urban-rural gmina (administrative district) in Poznań County, Greater Poland Voivodeship, in west-central Poland. Its seat is the town of Stęszew, which lies approximately 21 kilometres (13 mi) south-west of the regional capital Poznań.

The gmina covers an area of 175.22 square kilometres (67.7 sq mi), and as of 2006 its total population is 13,919 (out of which the population of Stęszew amounts to 5,339, and the population of the rural part of the gmina is 8,580).

== Villages ==
Apart from the town of Stęszew, Gmina Stęszew contains the villages and settlements of Będlewo, Dębienko, Dębno, Drogosławiec, Drożdżyce, Górka, Jeziorki, Krąplewo, Łódź, Mirosławki, Modrze, Piekary, Rybojedzko, Sapowice, Skrzynki, Słupia, Smętówko, Srocko Małe, Strykówko, Strykowo, Tomice, Tomiczki, Trzebaw, Twardowo, Wielka Wieś, Witobel, Wronczyn, Zamysłowo and Zaparcin.

== Neighbouring gminas ==
Gmina Stęszew is bordered by the gminas of Buk, Czempiń, Dopiewo, Granowo, Kamieniec, Komorniki, Kościan and Mosina.
