= Twardowo, Poznań County =

Twardowo
- Village
- Location within Poland
- Coordinates: 52°14′27″N 16°38′42″E
- Country: Poland
- Voivodeship: Greater Poland
- County: Poznań
- Gmina: Stęszew

Twardowo [tfarˈdɔvɔ] is a village in the administrative district of Gmina Stęszew, within Poznań County, Greater Poland Voivodeship, in west-central Poland.
