= Wronczyn, Gmina Stęszew =

Wronczyn
- Village
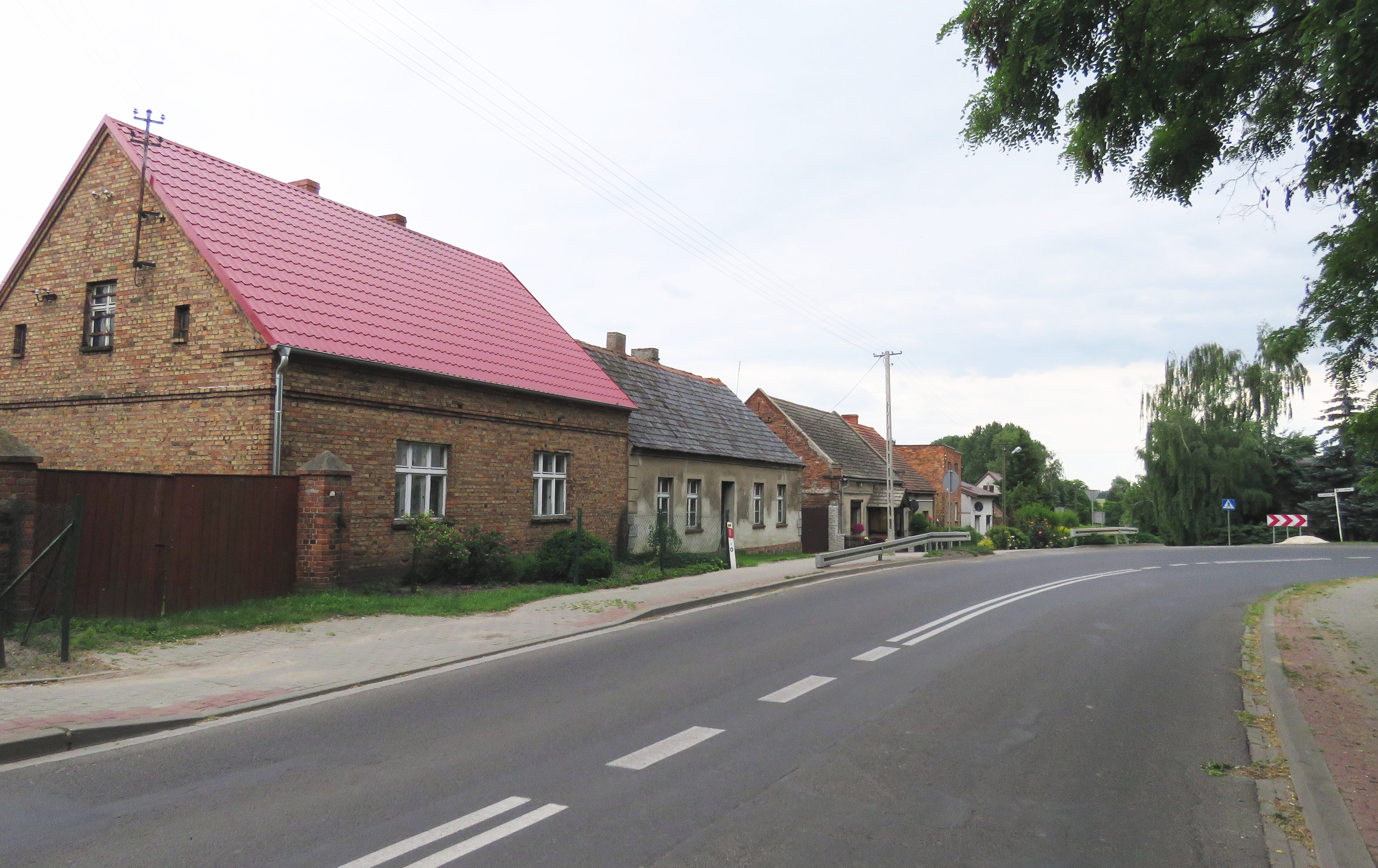

- Location within Poland
- Coordinates: 52°30′24″N 17°12′55″E
- Country: Poland
- Voivodeship: Greater Poland
- County: Poznań
- Gmina: Stęszew

Wronczyn [ˈvrɔnt͡ʂɨn] is a village in the administrative district of Gmina Stęszew, within Poznań County, Greater Poland Voivodeship, in west-central Poland.
