= Sapowice =

- Village
- Location within Poland
- Coordinates: 52°17′N 16°37′E
- Country: Poland
- Voivodeship: Greater Poland
- County: Poznań
- Gmina: Stęszew
- Population: 370

Sapowice [sapɔˈvit͡sɛ] is a village in the administrative district of Gmina Stęszew, within Poznań County, Greater Poland Voivodeship, in west-central Poland.
