= Drzęczewo Pierwsze =

- Village
- Location within Poland
- Coordinates: 51°53′59″N 17°3′56″E
- Country: Poland
- Voivodeship: Greater Poland
- County: Gostyń
- Gmina: Piaski
- Population: 132

Drzęczewo Pierwsze [dʐɛnˈt͡ʂɛvɔ ˈpjɛrfʂɛ] is a village in the administrative district of Gmina Piaski, within Gostyń County, Greater Poland Voivodeship, in west-central Poland.
