= Górka, Poznań County =

Górka
- Village
- Location within Poland
- Coordinates: 52°15′30″N 16°46′7″E
- Country: Poland
- Voivodeship: Greater Poland
- County: Poznań
- Gmina: Stęszew

Górka [ˈɡurka] is a village in the administrative district of Gmina Stęszew, within Poznań County, Greater Poland Voivodeship, in west-central Poland.
