= Jeziorki, Poznań County =

Jeziorki
- Village
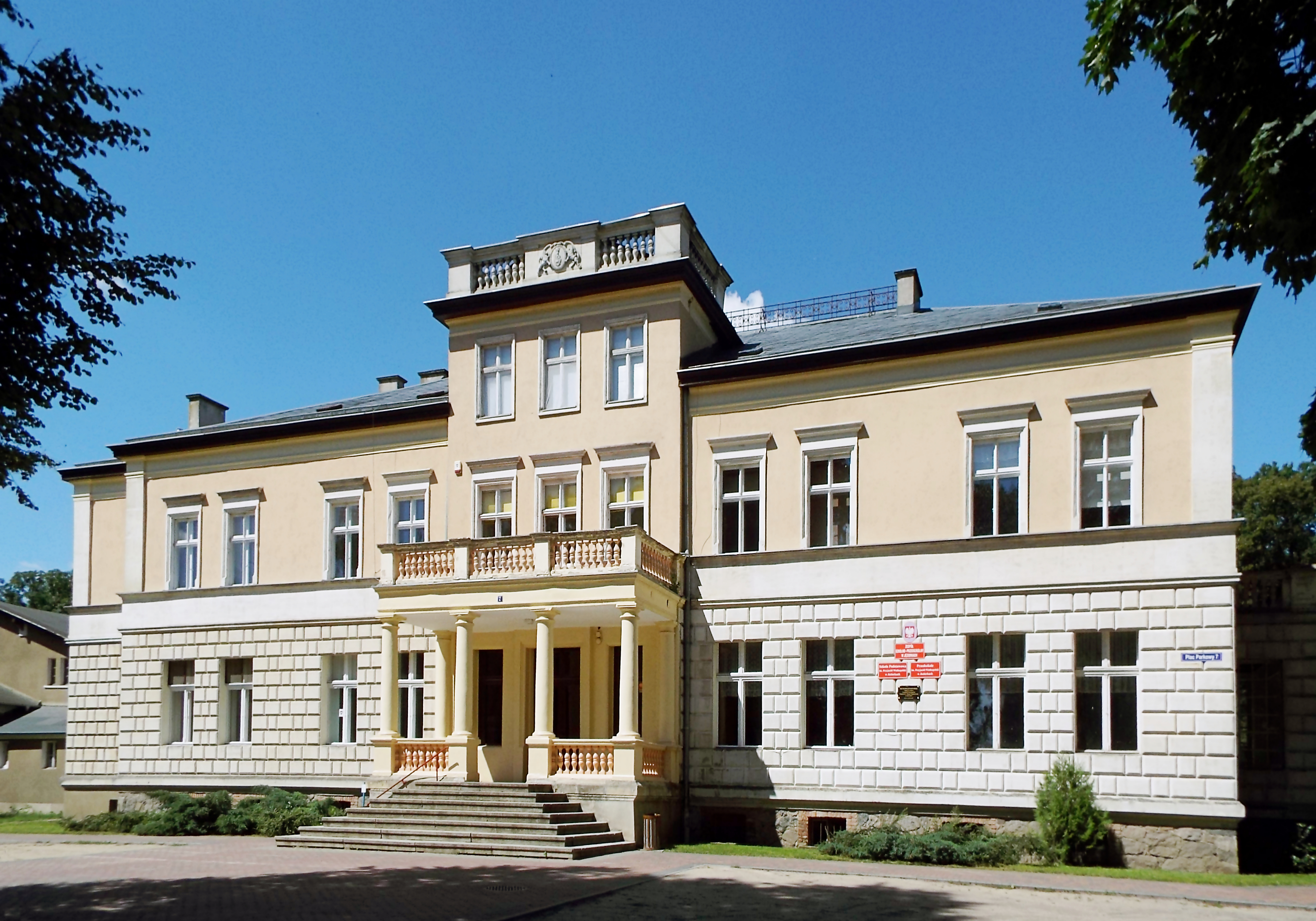
- Palace in Jeziorki

- Location within Poland
- Coordinates: 52°18′45″N 16°35′36″E
- Country: Poland
- Voivodeship: Greater Poland
- County: Poznań
- Gmina: Stęszew
- Time zone: UTC+1 (CET)
  - Summer (DST): UTC+2 (CEST)
- Vehicle registration: PZ, POZ
- Primary airport: Poznań–Ławica Airport

Jeziorki [jɛˈʑɔrki] is a village in the administrative district of Gmina Stęszew, within Poznań County, Greater Poland Voivodeship, in west-central Poland.

== History ==
Jeziorki was a private church village, administratively located in the Poznań County in the Poznań Voivodeship in the Greater Poland Province of the Kingdom of Poland.

During World War II, on 20 January 1945, Jeziorki was the first stop of a German-perpetrated death march of prisoners of various nationalities from the dissolved camp in Żabikowo to the Sachsenhausen concentration camp.
