= Jan Konarski =

Bishop of Kraków

- Bishop of Kraków
- Diocese: Diocese of Kraków
- In office: 21 July 1503 – 6 April 1524
- Predecessor: Frederick Jagiellon
- Successor: Piotr Tomicki

Orders
- Ordination: c. 1492
- Consecration: 1 October 1503

Personal details
- Born: 1447 Konary, Kingdom of Poland
- Died: 3 April 1525 (aged 77–78)
- Buried: Wawel Cathedral
- Denomination: Catholic
- Coat of arms

Jan Konarski (1447–1525) was a Polish nobleman who was Bishop of Kraków (1503–1524).

Konarski was born in 1447 to a family that claimed the Abdank heraldry. Because he was a member of the petty nobility, he had to rely on regal connections in order to achieve political success.

In 1518, as Bishop of Kraków, Konarski founded a church in Kobylin dedicated to Saint Stanislaus. Elsewhere, he financed several other dedications to Saint Stanislaus including art, an altar, and a reliquary. Konarski also welcomed Queen Bona Sforza to Kraków during her coronation in 1518. Later, during the Reformation, Konarski ordered the printing and distribution of Exsurge Domine, a papal bull that condemned Martin Luther's writings. He provided his own preface where he personally also warned of Martin Luther's new writings.

Konarski's tomb is located within Wawel Cathedral.
