= Skrzynki, Gmina Stęszew =

Skrzynki
- Village
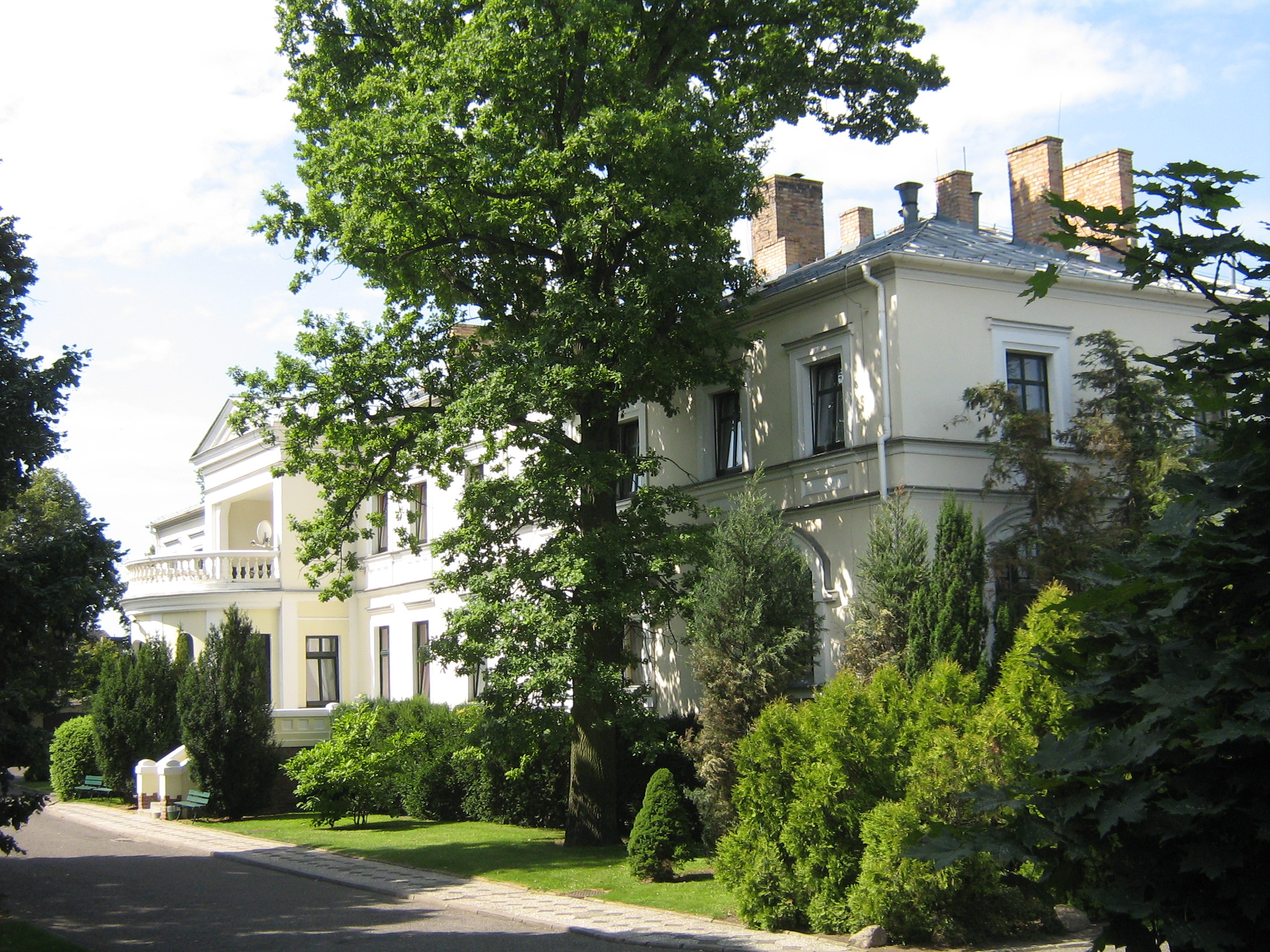

- Location within Poland
- Coordinates: 52°20′29″N 16°36′22″E
- Country: Poland
- Voivodeship: Greater Poland
- County: Poznań
- Gmina: Stęszew

Skrzynki [ˈskʂɨnki] is a village in the administrative district of Gmina Stęszew, within Poznań County, Greater Poland Voivodeship, in west-central Poland.Skrzynki [ˈskʂɨnki] Otusz train station is located in the village, near the border with the neighboring village of Otusz.Trains to Poznań, Zielona Góra, Buki, Opalenica, and Nowy Tomyśl stop at this railway station. The village also boasts a 19th-century manor house that once belonged to a German family Inflant.
