= Rybojedzko, Greater Poland Voivodeship =

Rybojedzko
- Village
- Location within Poland
- Coordinates: 52°18′40″N 16°37′46″E
- Country: Poland
- Voivodeship: Greater Poland
- County: Poznań
- Gmina: Stęszew

Population
  - Total: 80
- Vehicle registration: PZ, POZ
- Website: http://www.rybojedzko.pl

Rybojedzko [rɨbɔˈjɛt͡skɔ] is a village in the administrative district of Gmina Stęszew, within Poznań County, Greater Poland Voivodeship, in west-central Poland.

During World War II, in January 1945, a German-perpetrated death march of prisoners of various nationalities from the dissolved camp in Żabikowo to the Sachsenhausen concentration camp passed through the village.
