= Strykówko =

- Settlement
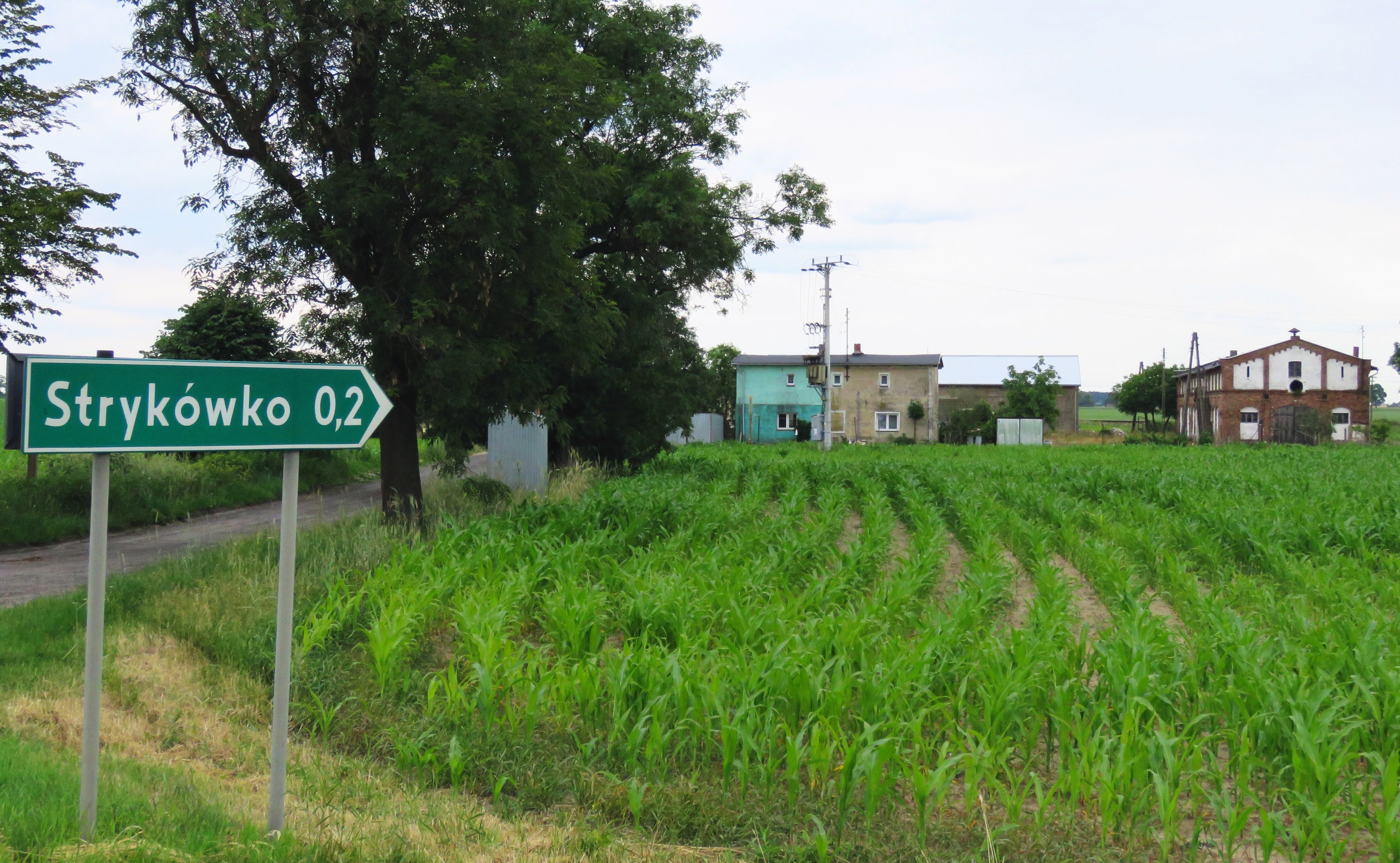

- Location within Poland
- Coordinates: 52°15′9″N 16°38′22″E
- Country: Poland
- Voivodeship: Greater Poland
- County: Poznań
- Gmina: Stęszew
- Population (approx.): 25

Strykówko [strɨˈkufkɔ] is a settlement in the administrative district of Gmina Stęszew, within Poznań County, Greater Poland Voivodeship, in west-central Poland.

The settlement has an approximate population of 25.
