= Grabonóg =

- Village
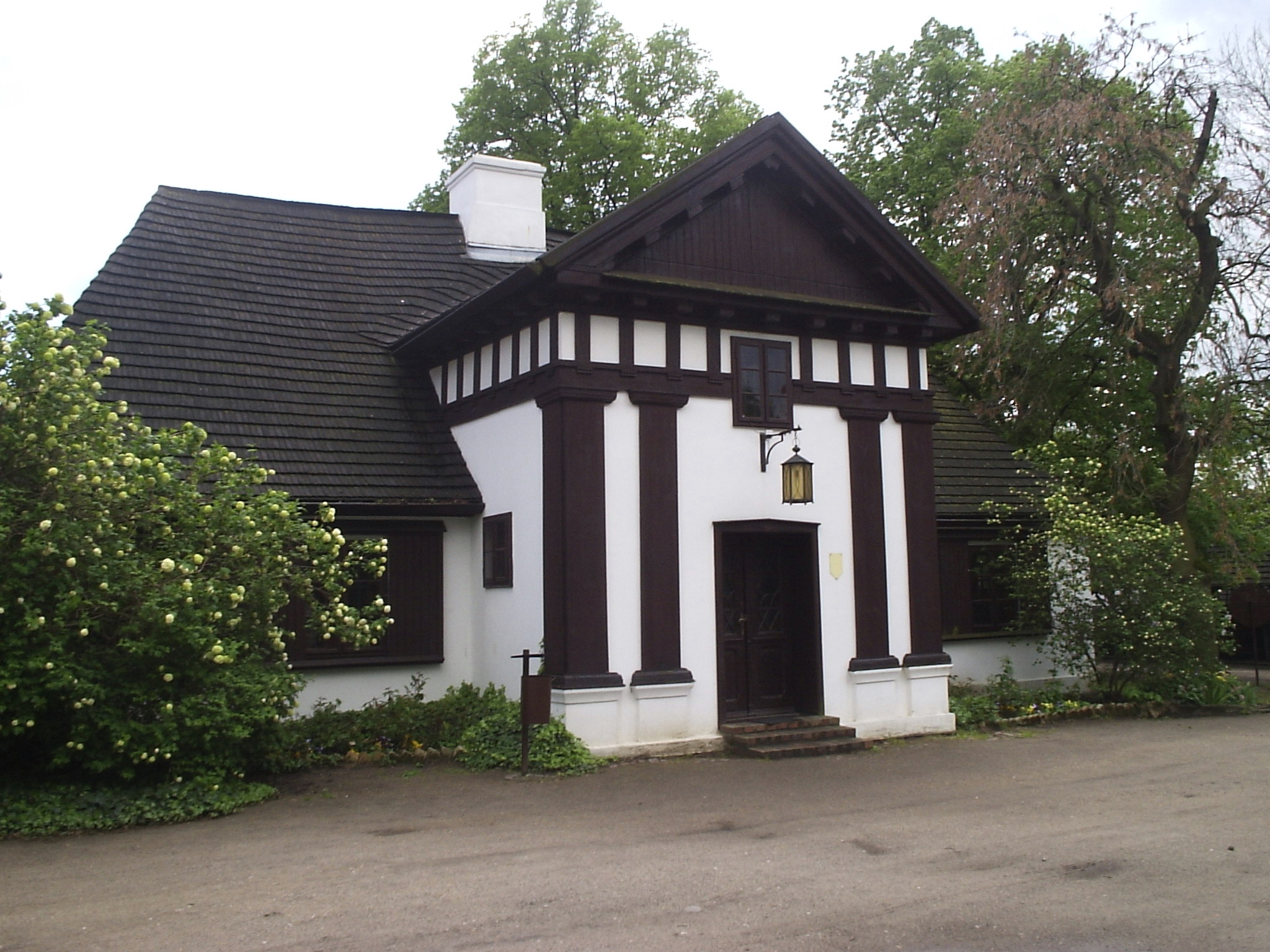
- Manor house

- Location within Poland
- Coordinates: 51°52′17″N 17°2′58″E
- Country: Poland
- Voivodeship: Greater Poland
- County: Gostyń
- Gmina: Piaski
- Population: 535

Grabonóg [ɡraˈbɔnuk] is a village in the administrative district of Gmina Piaski, within Gostyń County, Greater Poland Voivodeship, in west-central Poland.

== Notable residents ==
- Edmund Bojanowski, Polish layman beatified for sainthood by Pope John Paul II in 1999.
