= Tanecznica =

- Village
- Location within Poland
- Coordinates: 51°51′28″N 17°4′6″E
- Country: Poland
- Voivodeship: Greater Poland
- County: Gostyń
- Gmina: Piaski

Tanecznica [tanɛt͡ʂˈnit͡sa] is a village in the administrative district of Gmina Piaski, within Gostyń County, Greater Poland Voivodeship, in west-central Poland.
