= Górka Duchowna =

- Village
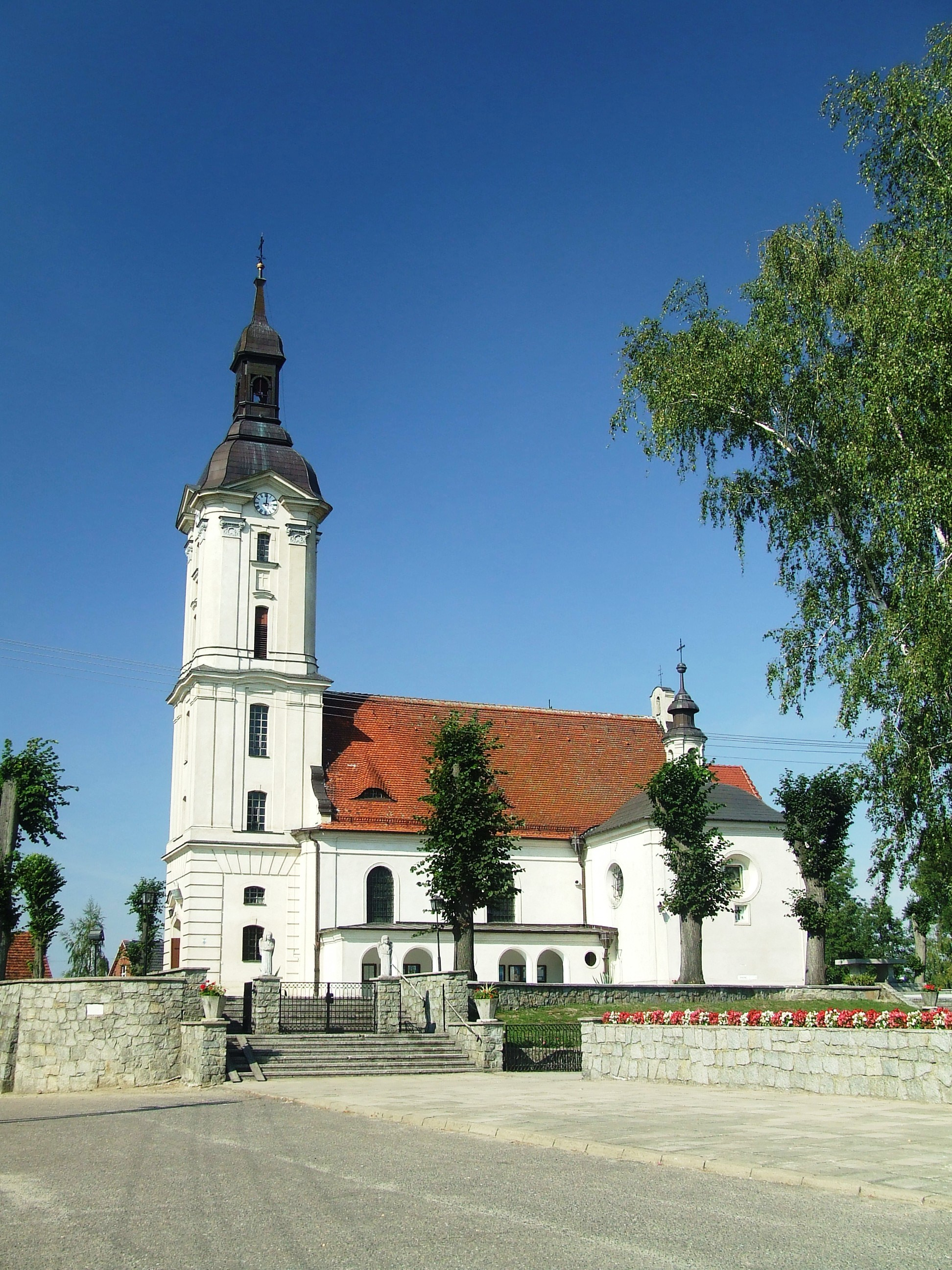
- Catholic church

- Location within Poland
- Coordinates: 51°57′N 16°36′E
- Country: Poland
- Voivodeship: Greater Poland
- County: Leszno
- Gmina: Lipno
- Population (approx.): 1,000

Górka Duchowna [ˈɡurka duˈxɔvna] is a village in the administrative district of Gmina Lipno, within Leszno County, Greater Poland Voivodeship, in west-central Poland.

The village has an approximate population of 1,000.

== Notable residents ==
- Edmund Bojanowski, Polish layman beatified for sainthood by Pope John Paul II in 1999. He died 7 August 1871 in Górka Duchowna.
