= Srocko Małe =

- Village
- Location within Poland
- Coordinates: 52°14′36″N 16°39′47″E
- Country: Poland
- Voivodeship: Greater Poland
- County: Poznań
- Gmina: Stęszew

Srocko Małe [ˈsrɔt͡skɔ ˈmawɛ] is a village in the administrative district of Gmina Stęszew, within Poznań County, Greater Poland Voivodeship, in west-central Poland. In the immediate vicinity are towns: Wronczyn, Będlewo, Piotrowo First, Sierniki, Głuchowo.
