= Tomiczki =

- Village
- Location within Poland
- Coordinates: 52°19′38″N 16°35′39″E
- Country: Poland
- Voivodeship: Greater Poland
- County: Poznań
- Gmina: Stęszew

Tomiczki [tɔˈmit͡ʂki] is a village in the administrative district of Gmina Stęszew, within Poznań County, Greater Poland Voivodeship, in west-central Poland.
