= Łódź, Gostyń County =

Łódź
- Village
- Location within Poland
- Coordinates: 51°50′15″N 17°6′10″E
- Country: Poland
- Voivodeship: Greater Poland
- County: Gostyń
- Gmina: Piaski

Łódź [wut͡ɕ] is a village in the administrative district of Gmina Piaski, within Gostyń County, Greater Poland Voivodeship, in west-central Poland.
