= Rębowo, Gostyń County =

Rębowo
- Village
- Location within Poland
- Coordinates: 51°50′N 17°5′E
- Country: Poland
- Voivodeship: Greater Poland
- County: Gostyń
- Gmina: Piaski
- Population: 241

Rębowo [rɛmˈbɔvɔ] is a village in the administrative district of Gmina Piaski, within Gostyń County, Greater Poland Voivodeship, in west-central Poland.
