= Smętówko, Greater Poland Voivodeship =

Smętówko
- Settlement
- Location within Poland
- Coordinates: 52°13′48″N 16°37′47″E
- Country: Poland
- Voivodeship: Greater Poland
- County: Poznań
- Gmina: Stęszew

Smętówko [smɛnˈtufkɔ] is a settlement in the administrative district of Gmina Stęszew, within Poznań County, Greater Poland Voivodeship, in west-central Poland.
