= Drogoszewo, Greater Poland Voivodeship =

Drogoszewo
- Village
- Location within Poland
- Coordinates: 51°53′14″N 17°08′48″E
- Country: Poland
- Voivodeship: Greater Poland
- County: Gostyń
- Gmina: Piaski

Drogoszewo [drɔɡɔˈʂɛvɔ] is a village in the administrative district of Gmina Piaski, within Gostyń County, Greater Poland Voivodeship, in west-central Poland.
