= Strykowo =

- Village
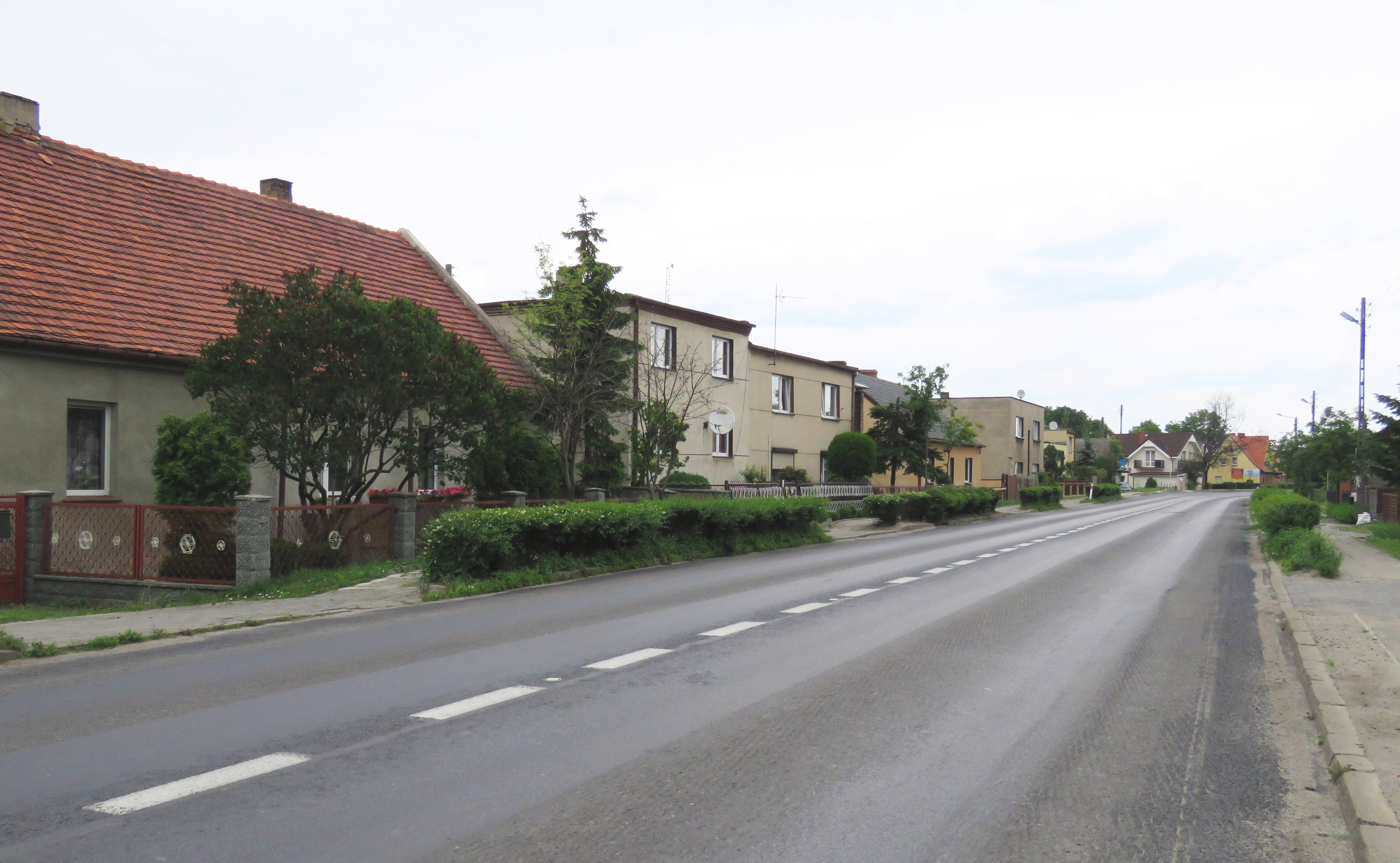

- Location within Poland
- Coordinates: 52°15′N 16°37′E
- Country: Poland
- Voivodeship: Greater Poland
- County: Poznań
- Gmina: Stęszew

Population (approx.)
  - Total: 1,300

Strykowo [strɨˈkɔvɔ] is a village in the administrative district of Gmina Stęszew, within Poznań County, Greater Poland Voivodeship, in west-central Poland.

The village has an approximate population of 1,300.

== History ==
The village was historically known both as Strykowo and Stryków. It was a private village of Polish nobility, including the Korzbok-Strykowski and Skaławski families.

Following the German-Soviet invasion of Poland, which started World War II in September 1939, the village was occupied by Germany until 1945.
