= Gmina Piaski, Greater Poland Voivodeship =

Gmina Piaski Piaski Commune
- Gmina
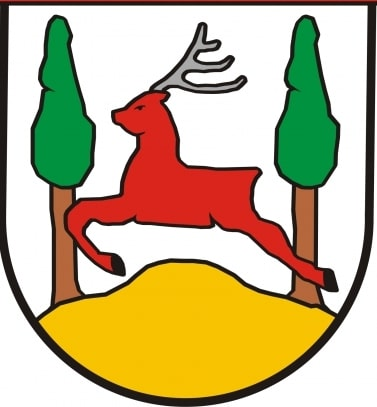
- Coat of arms

- Coordinates (Piaski): 51°53′7″N 17°4′27″E
- Country: Poland
- Voivodeship: Greater Poland
- County: Gostyń
- Seat: Piaski

Area
  - Total: 100.7 km^{2} (38.9 sq mi)

Population (2006)
  - Total: 8,293
  - Density: 82.35/km^{2} (213.3/sq mi)
- Website: http://www.piaski-wlkp.pl/

Gmina Piaski is a rural gmina (administrative district) in Gostyń County, Greater Poland Voivodeship, in west-central Poland. Its seat is the village of Piaski, which lies approximately 5 kilometres (3 mi) east of Gostyń and 59 km (37 mi) south of the regional capital Poznań.

The gmina covers an area of 100.7 square kilometres (38.9 sq mi), and as of 2006 its total population is 8,293.

== Villages ==
Gmina Piaski contains the villages and settlements of Anteczków, Bielawy Szelejewskie, Bodzewko Drugie, Bodzewko Pierwsze, Bodzewo, Drogoszewo, Drzęczewo Drugie, Drzęczewo Pierwsze, Głogówko, Godurowo, Grabonóg, Józefowo, Lafajetowo, Lipie, Łódź, Michałowo, Piaski, Podrzecze, Rębowo, Smogorzewo, Stefanowo, Strzelce Małe, Strzelce Wielkie, Szelejewo Drugie, Szelejewo Pierwsze, Talary and Tanecznica.

== Neighbouring gminas ==
Gmina Piaski is bordered by the gminas of Borek Wielkopolski, Dolsk, Gostyń, Krobia, Pępowo and Pogorzela.
