= Piaski, Gostyń County =

Piaski
- Village
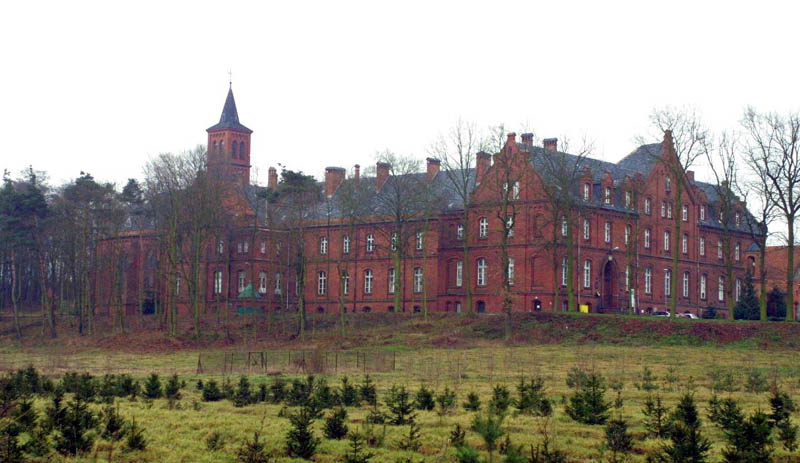
- Brothers Hospitallers Hospital

- Location within Poland
- Coordinates: 51°53′7″N 17°4′27″E
- Country: Poland
- Voivodeship: Greater Poland
- County: Gostyń
- Gmina: Piaski

Population
  - Total: 3,040
- Website: http://www.piaski-wlkp.pl/

Piaski (Polish pronunciation: [ˈpjaskʲi]) is a village in Gostyń County, Greater Poland Voivodeship, in west-central Poland. It is the seat of the gmina (administrative district) called Gmina Piaski.

Historically, the town had a large Jewish population, partially because for many years Jews were not permitted in the nearby town of Gostyń. Over time, this restriction was relaxed, and many of the families who remained in the area relocated. However, the late 19th century was a time of great emigration, as antisemitic rules and regulations were reestablished. The last Jewish family in the area of Gostyń / Piaski was that of Ewald Jacubowski, who moved to Germany (later Brazil) in 1927

Oscar Robert Hugo Renner was baptized here in 1845. He was the father of Oscar Herman Renner, co-founder of The SQR Store in Anaheim, California, United States, for half a century the largest department store in northern Orange County, California.
