= Strzelce Wielkie, Greater Poland Voivodeship =

Strzelce Wielkie
- Village
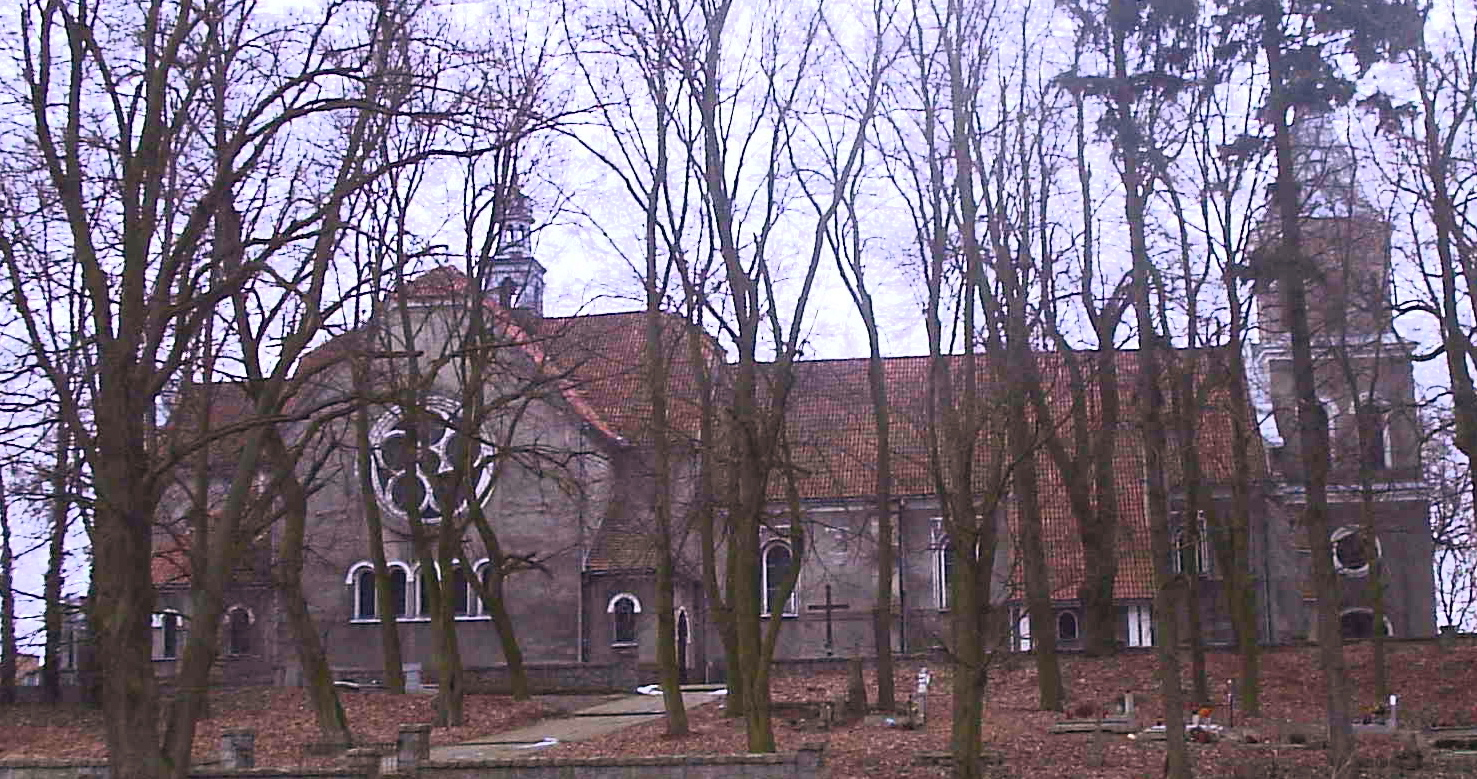
- Catholic church

- Location within Poland
- Coordinates: 51°52′38″N 17°5′19″E
- Country: Poland
- Voivodeship: Greater Poland
- County: Gostyń
- Gmina: Piaski
- Population: 352

Strzelce Wielkie [ˈstʂɛlt͡sɛ ˈvjɛlkʲɛ] is a village in the administrative district of Gmina Piaski, within Gostyń County, Greater Poland Voivodeship, in west-central Poland.
