= Łódź, Poznań County =

Łódź
- Village
- Location within Poland
- Coordinates: 52°15′N 16°44′E
- Country: Poland
- Voivodeship: Greater Poland
- County: Poznań
- Gmina: Stęszew
- Population: 190

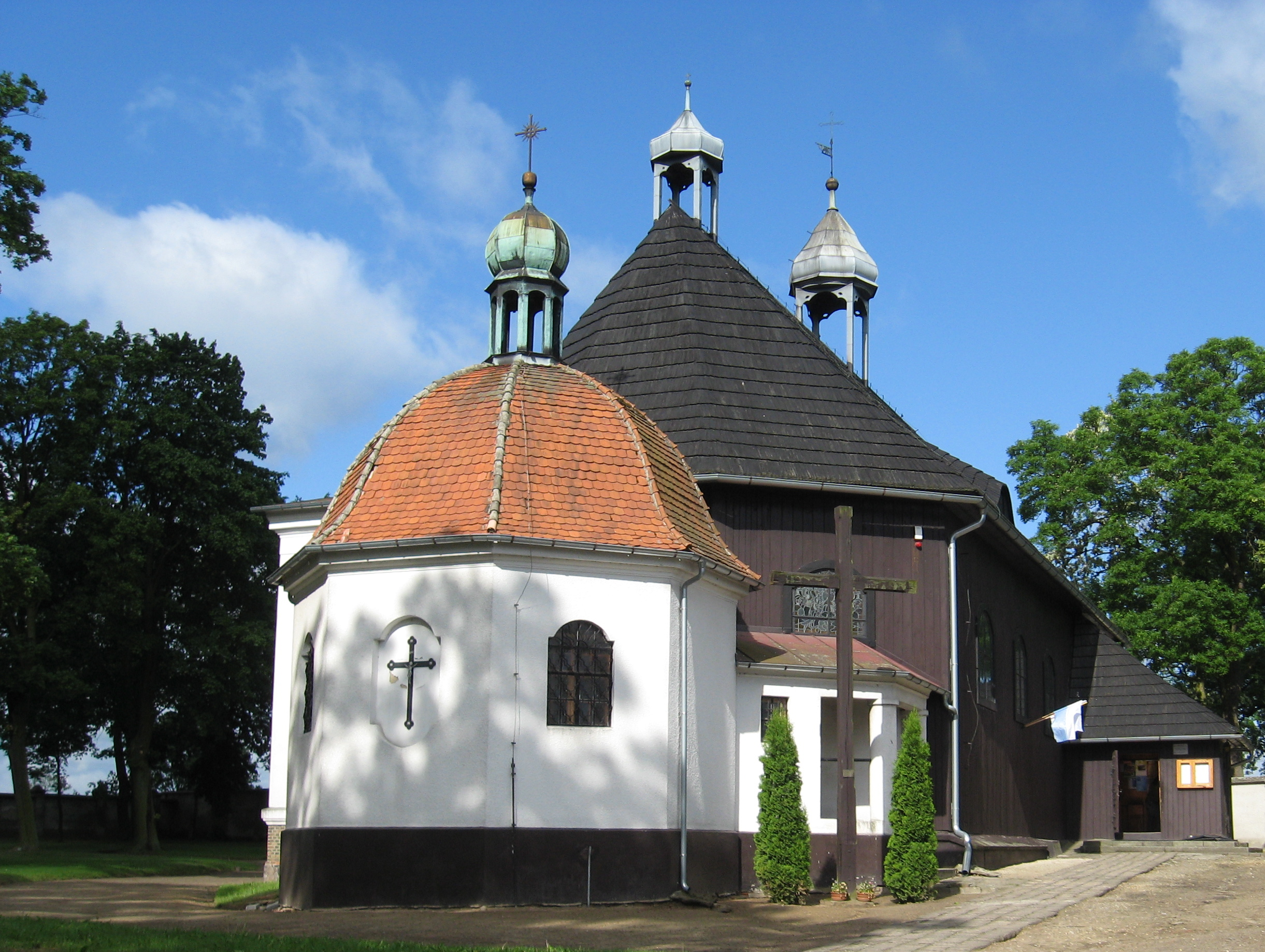
Św. Jadwiga

Łódź [wut͡ɕ] is a village in the administrative district of Gmina Stęszew, within Poznań County, Greater Poland Voivodeship, in west-central Poland.
