= Tomice, Poznań County =

Tomice
- Village
- Location within Poland
- Coordinates: 52°19′25″N 16°36′40″E
- Country: Poland
- Voivodeship: Greater Poland
- County: Poznań
- Gmina: Stęszew
- Population: 90

Tomice [tɔˈmit͡sɛ] is a village in the administrative district of Gmina Stęszew, within Poznań County, Greater Poland Voivodeship, in west-central Poland.

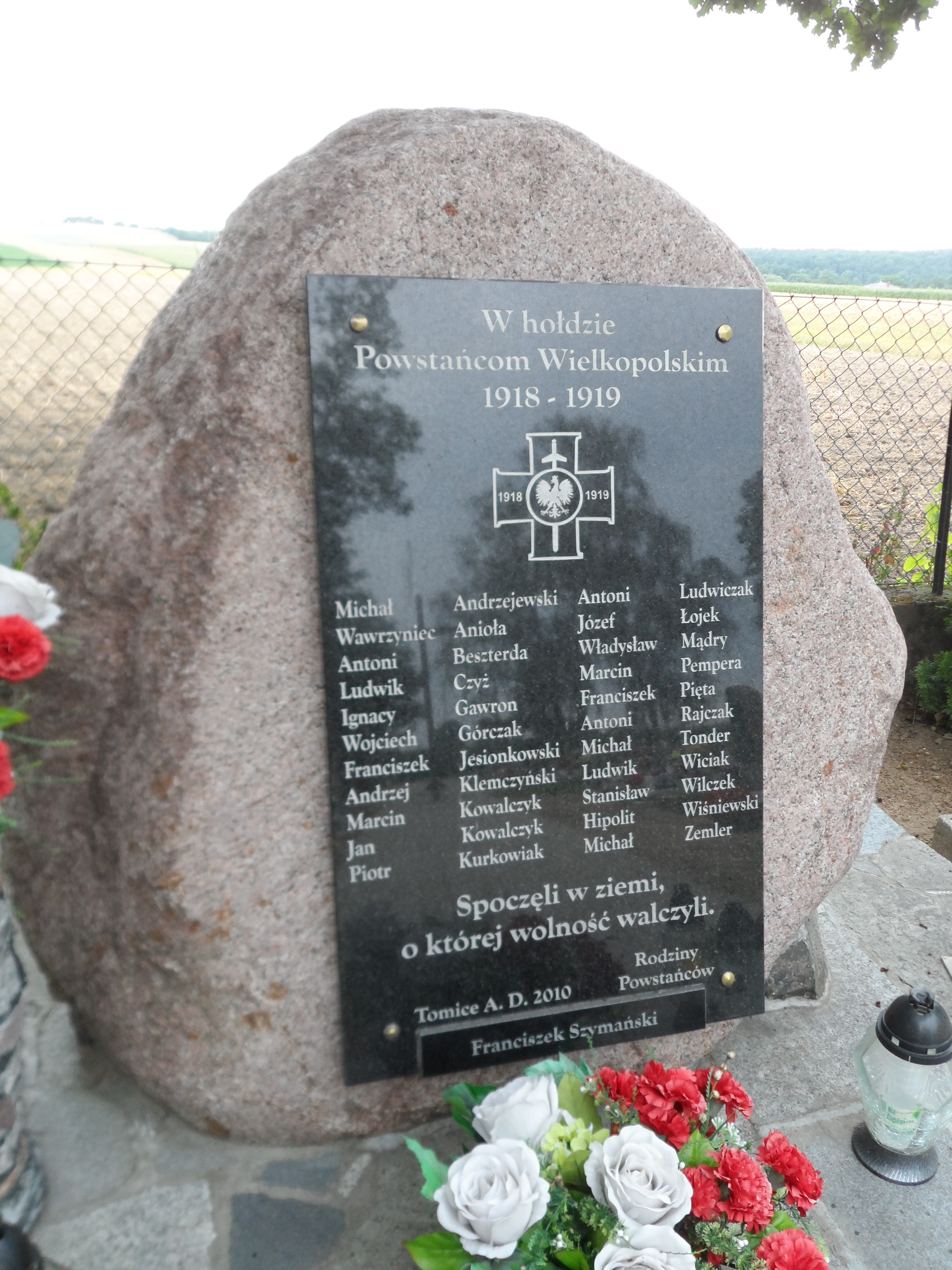
A plaque commemorating the participants of the Greater Poland uprising (1918–1919) from Tomice and its environs.
