= Stęszew =

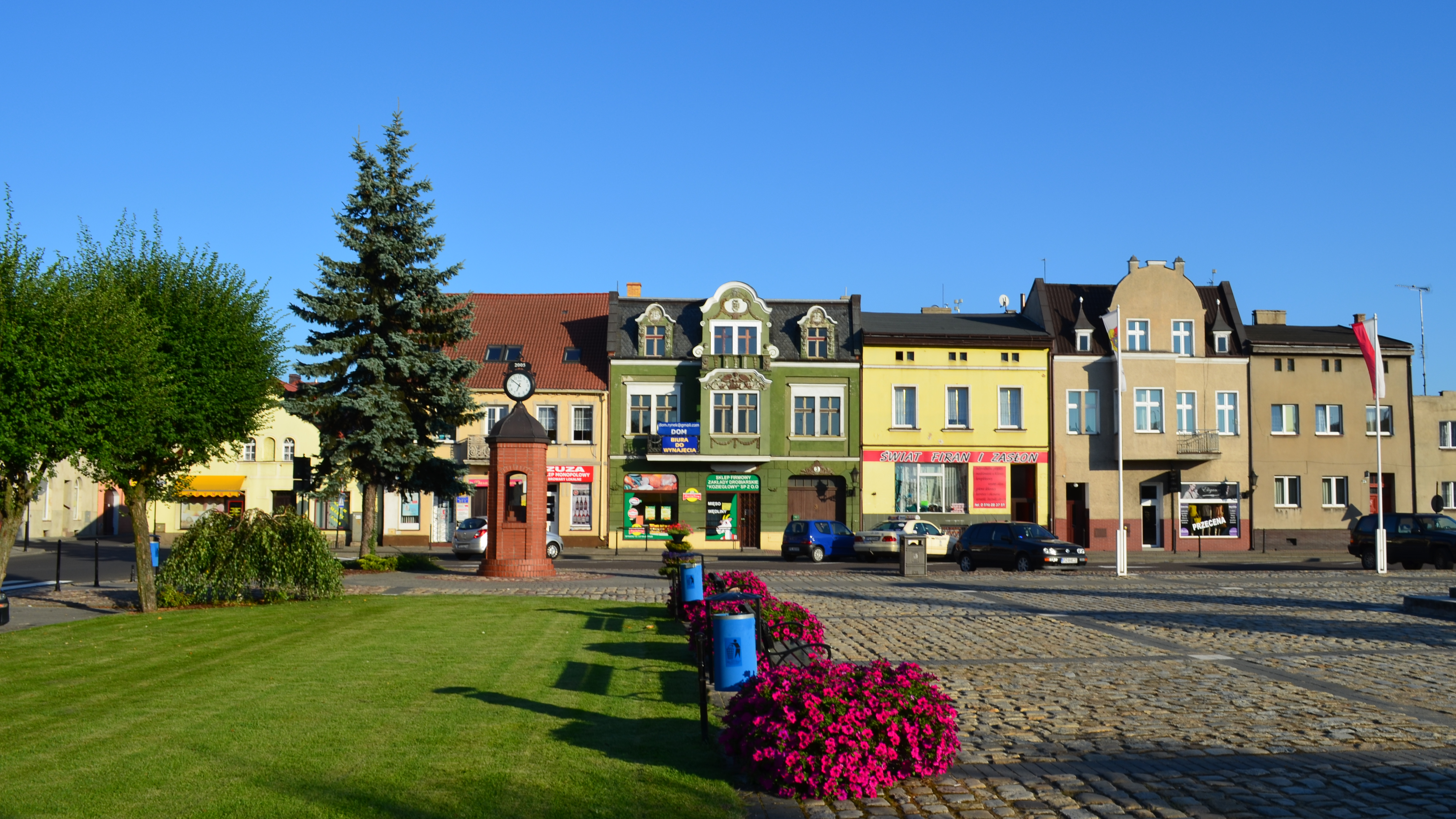
- Marketplace

- Coat of arms

- Location within Poland
- Coordinates: 52°16′45″N 16°42′29″E
- Country: Poland
- Voivodeship: Greater Poland
- County: Poznań
- Gmina: Stęszew
- Town rights: 1370

Government
  - Mayor: Włodzimierz Pinczak

Area
  - Total: 5.63 km^{2} (2.17 sq mi)

Population (2016)
  - Total: 5,941
  - Density: 1,060/km^{2} (2,730/sq mi)
- Time zone: UTC+1 (CET)
  - Summer (DST): UTC+2 (CEST)
- Postal code: 62-060
- Area code: +48 61
- Car plates: PZ
- Climate: Cfb
- Website: https://www.steszew.pl

Stęszew [ˈstɛ̃ʂɛf] is a town in western Poland, with 5,248 inhabitants (2004). It is located in Poznań County, within the Greater Poland Voivodeship.

== Geography ==
Stęszew is situated on the Samica Stęszewska River. There are three lakes within the town limits: Dębno, Bochenek and Lipno.

== History ==
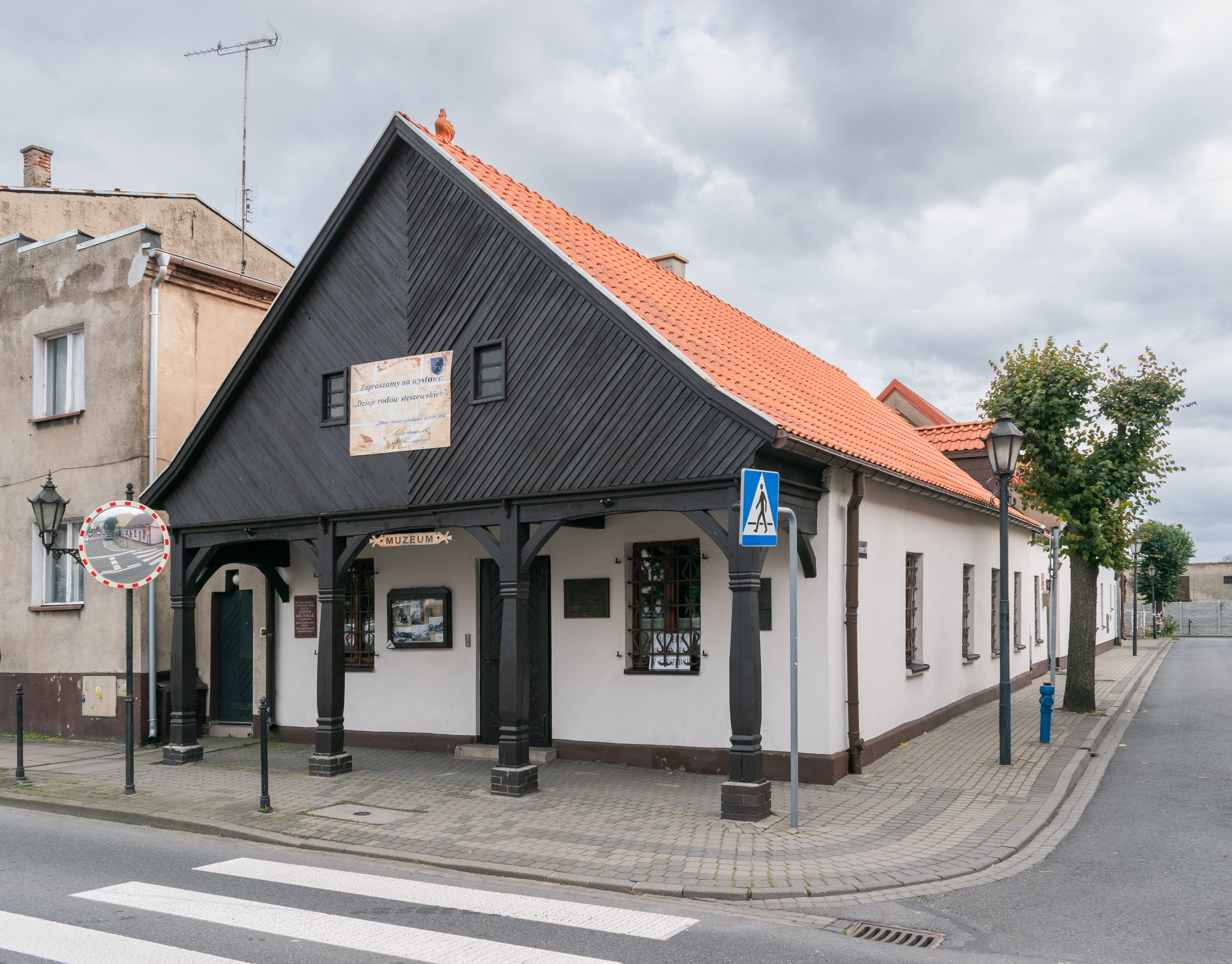
Regional Museum

Stęszew was once an important stop in a trade route from Silesia. In 1370 king Casimir III the Great granted the settlement city rights. It was a private town of Polish nobility, administratively located in the Poznań County in the Poznań Voivodeship in the Greater Poland Province of the Polish Crown. The town developed rapidly until the Swedish Deluge and Seven Years' War. Eventually, in 1793, Stęszew became part of the Prussian Partition of Poland after the Second Partition of Poland. In 1799 the town was sold by Countess Dorota Jabłonowska to Prince William I of the Netherlands. Following the successful Greater Poland uprising of 1806, it was regained by Poles and included in the short-lived Duchy of Warsaw. After its dissolution in 1815, it was reannexed by Prussia, and following World War I, Poland regained independence and control of the town. From 1922 the town was within the Polish Poznań Voivodeship.

Following the joint German-Soviet invasion of Poland, which started World War II in September 1939, the town was under German occupation. Local Polish people were expelled or forced into labor and concentration camps. In 1939, the occupiers renamed the town to Seenbrück in attempt to erase traces of Polish origin. Four Poles from Stęszew were also murdered by the Russians in the large Katyn massacre in April–May 1940. The Polish resistance was active in Stęszew. The leaders of the local unit of the Narodowa Organizacja Bojowa organization were arrested by the Germans in October and November 1941, and then sentenced to death and executed the following year. In January 1945, a German-perpetrated death march of prisoners of various nationalities from the dissolved camp in Żabikowo to the Sachsenhausen concentration camp passed through the town. The liberation of Stęszew and neighbouring villages took place in January 1945.

== Transport ==
Stęszew is bypassed to the west by the S5 expressway. Exit 37 of the expressway provides for quick access to Poznań to the north and to Wrocław in the south.

Stęszew has a station on the Poznań-Wolsztyn railway line.

Buses connect Stęszew to Poznań and Leszno.

== Sport ==
The town's most notable sports club is Lipno Stęszew with football and field hockey sections.
