= National Parks of Poland =

Location of national parks in Poland

There are 23 national parks in Poland. These were formerly run by the Polish Board of National Parks (Polish: Krajowy Zarząd Parków Narodowych), but in 2004 responsibility for their management was transferred to what is now the Ministry of Climate and the Environment. Most national parks are divided into strictly and partially protected zones. They currently encompass around 186000 hectares of forest, or around 2% of all the country's woodlands.

Polish national parks have carried out numerous research programs and they play an important role in the ecological education. The national parks can be visited as they provide a well-developed tourism infrastructure, though visitors typically need to keep to designated areas such as trails. Many parks furthermore offer thematic trails, educational centres and natural history museums.

== Legal basis and governance of Poland's national parks ==
In order to become a national park, an area needs to be at least 1000 hectares in size and have outstanding environmental and cultural value. The ecosystems in the park need to be in their natural state—or close to it. National parks usually play host to several "valuable" species; usually rare or protected ones.

The area of a national park is divided into different zones using separate methods of conservation. There are strict protection zones, as well as active and landscape-related ones. Additionally, they are usually surrounded by a protective buffer zone called otulina. Human activity is also heavily restricted within the park itself, with strict conservation rules in place. There are also significant restrictions on what can be done within the buffer zones.

Poland's national parks are governed by the Nature Conservation Act, last amended in 2004, and they are funded from the central state budget. Each park is managed by a director, who works closely with an oversight board. They are further supervised by the Ministry of Climate and Environment.

== List of Poland's national parks ==
Landscape belts
Baltic Sea coast	Lowland belt	Sudete Mountains
Lake belt	Upland belt	Carpathian Mountains

Image	Name (Polish)	Name origin	Seat	Location	Area (km^{2})	Year	Symbol	UNESCO status	Neighboring national parks
Babia Góra	Babia Góra National Park (Babiogórski Park Narodowy)	Babia Góra Massif	Zawoja	49°35′N 19°32′E	33.92	1954	Laser archangelica	Biosphere reserve	Horná Orava Protected Landscape Area, Slovakia
Białowieża Forest	Białowieża National Park (Białowieski Park Narodowy)	Białowieża (village) and Białowieża Forest	Białowieża	52°40′N 23°50′E	105.02	1932	European bison	World Heritage Site, biosphere reserve	Belavezhskaya Pushcha National Park, Belarus
Biebrza River	Biebrza National Park (Biebrzański Park Narodowy)	Biebrza River	Osowiec-Twierdza	53°35′N 22°46′E	592.23	1993	Ruff	Biosphere reserve	
Krzemień Mountain in the Bieszczady Range	Bieszczady National Park (Bieszczadzki Park Narodowy)	Bieszczady Mountains	Ustrzyki Górne	49°06′N 22°40′E	292.01	1973	Lynx	Biosphere reserve	Poloniny National Park, Slovakia
Tuchola Forest	Tuchola Forest National Park (Park Narodowy „Bory Tucholskie”)	Tuchola Forest	Charzykowy	53°36′N 18°00′E	47.98	1996	Western capercaillie		
Ostrowieckie Lake	Drawno National Park (Drawieński Park Narodowy)	Drawa River	Drawno	53°07′N 16°15′E	114.41	1990	Otter		
Turbacz Mountain in the Gorce Range	Gorce National Park (Gorczański Park Narodowy)	Gorce Mountains	Poręba Wielka	49°34′N 20°10′E	70.29	1981	Fire salamander		
A moose in the Kampinos Forest	Kampinos National Park (Kampinoski Park Narodowy)	Kampinos (village) and Kampinos Forest	Izabelin C	52°19′N 20°28′E	385.44	1959	European elk	Biosphere reserve	
Mały Szyszak Mountain in the Giant Mountains	Karkonosze National Park (Karkonoski Park Narodowy)	Karkonosze (Giant Mountains)	Jelenia Góra	50°46′N 15°37′E	55.76	1959	Campanula bohemica and Gentiana asclepiadea	Biosphere reserve	Krkonošský NP, Czech Republic
Visitor center and museum	Magura National Park (Magurski Park Narodowy)	Magura Wątkowska massif	Krempna	49°31′N 21°31′E	194.39	1995	Lesser spotted eagle		
A male western marsh harrier	Narew National Park (Narwiański Park Narodowy)	Narew River	Kurowo	53°04′N 22°53′E	68.1	1996	Western marsh harrier		
Limestone formations in the Ojcowski National Park	Ojców National Park (Ojcowski Park Narodowy)	Ojców (village)	Ojców	50°13′N 19°50′E	21.46	1956	Bat		
Trzy Korony Mountain overlooking the Dunajec River	Pieniny National Park (Pieniński Park Narodowy)	Pieniny Mountains	Krościenko nad Dunajcem	49°25′N 20°22′E	23.46	1932	Trzy Korony Mountain and the Dunajec River		Pieninský NP, Slovakia
A common crane	Polesie National Park (Poleski Park Narodowy)	Polesie region	Urszulin	51°27′N 23°09′E	97.62	1990	Common crane	Biosphere reserve	Shatskyy NP, Ukraine
Konik horses in the Roztoczański National Park	Roztocze National Park (Roztoczański Park Narodowy)	Roztocze (range of hills)	Zwierzyniec	50°36′N 23°01′E	84.83	1974	Konik		
A sand dune in the Slovincian National Park	Slovincian National Park (Słowiński Park Narodowy)	Slovincian tribe	Smołdzino	54°40′N 17°13′E	186.18	1967	Seagull	Biosphere reserve	
Błędne Skały in the Stołowe Mountains	Stołowe Mountains National Park (Park Narodowy Gór Stołowych)	Stołowe Mountains	Kudowa-Zdrój	50°28′N 16°20′E	63.40	1993	Szczeliniec Wielki		
Bukowa Góra in the Świętokrzyskie Mountains	Świętokrzyski National Park (Świętokrzyski Park Narodowy)	Świętokrzyskie Mountains	Bodzentyn	50°52′N 20°58′E	76.26	1950	Deer		
Czarny Staw (Black Lake) in the High Tatra Mountains	Tatra National Park (Tatrzański Park Narodowy)	Tatra Mountains	Zakopane	49°15′N 19°56′E	211.64	1954	Tatra chamois	Biosphere reserve	Tatra National Park, Slovakia
Postomia River in the Ujście Warty NP	Warta Mouth National Park (Park Narodowy „Ujście Warty”)	Warta mouth	Chyrzyno	52°35′N 14°42′E	80.38	2001	Tundra bean goose		
A stone commemorating Prof. Adam Wodziczko who advocated the idea of creating the Wielkopolski NP	Wielkopolska National Park (Wielkopolski Park Narodowy)	Greater Poland region	Jeziory	52°17′N 16°51′E	75.84	1957	Tawny owl		
Wigry Lake	Wigry National Park (Wigierski Park Narodowy)	Wigry Lake	Krzywe	54°02′N 23°06′E	150.86	1989	Beaver and Wigry Lake		
A cliff and a beach in the Woliński NP	Wolin National Park (Woliński Park Narodowy)	Wolin Island	Misdroy	53°55′N 14°30′E	109.37	1960	White-tailed eagle		

== Museums in national parks ==
- Museum of Nature and Forest Białowieża National Park, Palace Park, Białowieża
- Educational Centre of Babia Góra National Park, Zawoja
- Museum of Natural History Bieszczady National Park, Ustrzyki Dolne
- Museum of Natural History Kampinos National Park, Kampinos
- Science Museum at Karkonosze National Park, Jelenia Góra
- Museum im. prof. Władysława Szafera, Ojców
- Centre for Education and Museum at Polesie National Park, Załucze Stare
- Centre for Education and Museum at Roztocze National Park, Zwierzyniec
- Museum of Nature and Forest at Slovincian National Park, Smołdzino
- Museum of Natural History at Świętokrzyski National Park, Święty Krzyż
- Natural History Museum of Tatra National Park, Zakopane
- Natural History Museum of Wielkopolska National Park, Jeziory
- Wigler Museum (Museum at Wigry National Park), Stary Folwark
- Natural History Museum of Wolin National Park, Misdroy
- Field Station DNP "Bogdanka", Drawno
- Karkonosze Environmental Education Center, Szklarska Poręba

== See also ==
- List of Biosphere Reserves in Poland
- List of Landscape Parks of Poland

== Sources ==
=== Legal documents ===
Ordinances issued by the Polish Council of Ministers, establishing individual national parks (all in Polish, in PDF format).

- Rozporządzenie Rady Ministrów z dnia 30 października 1954 r. w sprawie utworzenia Babiogórskiego Parku Narodowego, Dz.U. 1955 nr 4 poz. 25
- Rozporządzenie Rady Ministrów z dnia 8 sierpnia 1997 r. w sprawie Babiogórskiego Parku Narodowego, Dz.U. 1997 nr 99 poz. 608
- Rozporządzenie Rady Ministrów z dnia 21 listopada 1947 r. o utworzeniu Białowieskiego Parku Narodowego, Dz.U. 1947 nr 74 poz. 469
- Rozporządzenie Rady Ministrów z dnia 16 lipca 1996 r. w sprawie Białowieskiego Parku Narodowego, Dz.U. 1996 nr 93 poz. 424
- Rozporządzenie Rady Ministrów z dnia 9 września 1993 r. w sprawie utworzenia Biebrzańskiego Parku Narodowego, Dz.U. 1993 nr 86 poz. 399
- Rozporządzenie Rady Ministrów z dnia 4 sierpnia 1973 r. w sprawie utworzenia Bieszczadzkiego Parku Narodowego, Dz.U. 1973 nr 31 poz. 179
- Rozporządzenie Rady Ministrów z dnia 14 maja 1996 r. w sprawie utworzenia Parku Narodowego "Bory Tucholskie", Dz.U. 1996 nr 64 poz. 305
- Rozporządzenie Rady Ministrów z dnia 10 kwietnia 1990 r. w sprawie utworzenia Drawieńskiego Parku Narodowego, Dz.U. 1990 nr 26 poz. 151
- Rozporządzenie Rady Ministrów z dnia 8 sierpnia 1980 r. w sprawie utworzenia Gorczańskiego Parku Narodowego, Dz.U. 1980 nr 18 poz. 66
- Rozporządzenie Rady Ministrów z dnia 16 września 1993 r. w sprawie utworzenia Parku Narodowego Gór Stołowych, Dz.U. 1993 nr 88 poz. 407
- Rozporządzenie Rady Ministrów z dnia 16 stycznia 1959 r. w sprawie utworzenia Kampinoskiego Parku Narodowego, Dz.U. 1959 nr 17 poz. 91
- Rozporządzenie Rady Ministrów z dnia 16 stycznia 1959 r. w sprawie utworzenia Karkonoskiego Parku Narodowego, Dz.U. 1959 nr 17 poz. 90
- Rozporządzenie Rady Ministrów z dnia 24 listopada 1994 r. w sprawie utworzenia Magurskiego Parku Narodowego, Dz.U. 1994 nr 126 poz. 618
- Rozporządzenie Rady Ministrów z dnia 1 lipca 1996 r. w sprawie utworzenia Narwiańskiego Parku Narodowego, Dz.U. 1996 nr 77 poz. 368
- Rozporządzenie Rady Ministrów z dnia 14 stycznia 1956 r. w sprawie utworzenia Ojcowskiego Parku Narodowego, Dz.U. 1956 nr 4 poz. 22
- Rozporządzenie Rady Ministrów z dnia 30 października 1954 r. w sprawie utworzenia Pienińskiego Parku Narodowego, Dz.U. 1955 nr 4 poz. 24
- Rozporządzenie Rady Ministrów z dnia 10 kwietnia 1990 r. w sprawie utworzenia Poleskiego Parku Narodowego, Dz.U. 1990 nr 27 poz. 155
- Rozporządzenie Rady Ministrów z dnia 10 maja 1974 r. w sprawie utworzenia Roztoczańskiego Parku Narodowego, Dz.U. 1974 nr 21 poz. 120
- Rozporządzenie Rady Ministrów z dnia 23 września 1966 r. w sprawie utworzenia Słowińskiego Parku Narodowego, Dz.U. 1966 nr 42 poz. 254
- Rozporządzenie Rady Ministrów z dnia 1 kwietnia 1950 r. w sprawie utworzenia Świętokrzyskiego Parku Narodowego, Dz.U. 1950 nr 14 poz. 133
- Rozporządzenie Rady Ministrów z dnia 30 października 1954 r. w sprawie utworzenia Tatrzańskiego Parku Narodowego, Dz.U. 1955 nr 4 poz. 23
- Rozporządzenie Rady Ministrów z dnia 19 czerwca 2001 r. w sprawie utworzenia Parku Narodowego "Ujście Warty", Dz.U. 2001 nr 67 poz. 681
- Rozporządzenie Rady Ministrów z dnia 16 kwietnia 1957 r. w sprawie utworzenia Wielkopolskiego Parku Narodowego, Dz.U. 1957 nr 24 poz. 114
- Rozporządzenie Rady Ministrów z dnia 27 czerwca 1988 r. w sprawie utworzenia Wigierskiego Parku Narodowego, Dz.U. 1988 nr 25 poz. 173
- Rozporządzenie Rady Ministrów z dnia 3 marca 1960 r. w sprawie utworzenia Wolińskiego Parku Narodowego, Dz.U. 1960 nr 14 poz. 79

=== Websites ===
Official websites of individual national parks

- bgpn.gov.pl, Babiogórski Park Narodowy
- bpn.gov.pl, Białowieski Park Narodowy
- bbpn.gov.pl, Biebrzański Park Narodowy
- bdpn.gov.pl, Bieszczadzki Park Narodowy
- pnbt.gov.pl, Park Narodowy Bory Tucholskie
- dpn.gov.pl, Drawieński Park Narodowy
- gpn.gov.pl, Gorczański Park Narodowy
- pngs.gov.pl, Park Narodowy Gór Stołowych
- kampn.gov.pl, Kampinoski Park Narodowy
- kpn.gov.pl, Karkonoski Park Narodowy
- mpn.gov.pl, Magurski Park Narodowy
- npn.gov.pl, Narwiański Park Narodowy
- opn.gov.pl, Ojcowski Park Narodowy
- piepn.gov.pl, Pieniński Park Narodowy
- polpn.gov.pl, Poleski Park Narodowy
- rpn.gov.pl, Roztoczański Park Narodowy
- spn.gov.pl, Słowiński Park Narodowy
- swpn.gov.pl, Świętokrzyski Park Narodowy
- tpn.gov.pl, Tatrzański Park Narodowy
- pnuw.gov.pl, Park Narodowy Ujście Warty
- wpn.gov.pl, Wielkopolski Park Narodowy
- wigpn.gov.pl, Wigierski Park Narodowy
- wopn.gov.pl, Woliński Park Narodowy
