= Aleksandrowo =

Aleksandrowo may refer to the following places:

- Aleksandrowo, Bydgoszcz County in Kuyavian-Pomeranian Voivodeship (north-central Poland)
- Aleksandrowo, Włocławek County in Kuyavian-Pomeranian Voivodeship (north-central Poland)
- Aleksandrowo, Żnin County in Kuyavian-Pomeranian Voivodeship (north-central Poland)
- Aleksandrowo, Sejny County in Podlaskie Voivodeship (north-east Poland)
- Aleksandrowo, Siemiatycze County in Podlaskie Voivodeship (north-east Poland)
- Aleksandrowo, Suwałki County in Podlaskie Voivodeship (north-east Poland)
- Aleksandrowo, Mława County in Masovian Voivodeship (east-central Poland)
- Aleksandrowo, Gmina Nasielsk, Nowy Dwór County in Masovian Voivodeship (east-central Poland)
- Aleksandrowo, Gmina Troszyn in Masovian Voivodeship (east-central Poland)
- Aleksandrowo, Płock County in Masovian Voivodeship (east-central Poland)
- Aleksandrowo, Przasnysz County in Masovian Voivodeship (east-central Poland)
- Aleksandrowo, Gostyń County in Greater Poland Voivodeship (west-central Poland)
- Aleksandrowo, Szamotuły County in Greater Poland Voivodeship (west-central Poland)
- Aleksandrowo, Wągrowiec County in Greater Poland Voivodeship (west-central Poland)
- Aleksandrowo, Warmian-Masurian Voivodeship (north Poland)
