= Słupie =

Słupie may refer to the following places:

- Słupie, Lublin Voivodeship (east Poland)
- Słupie, Gmina Bakałarzewo in Podlaskie Voivodeship (north-east Poland)
- Słupie, Gmina Suwałki in Podlaskie Voivodeship (north-east Poland)
