= Ojców Castle =

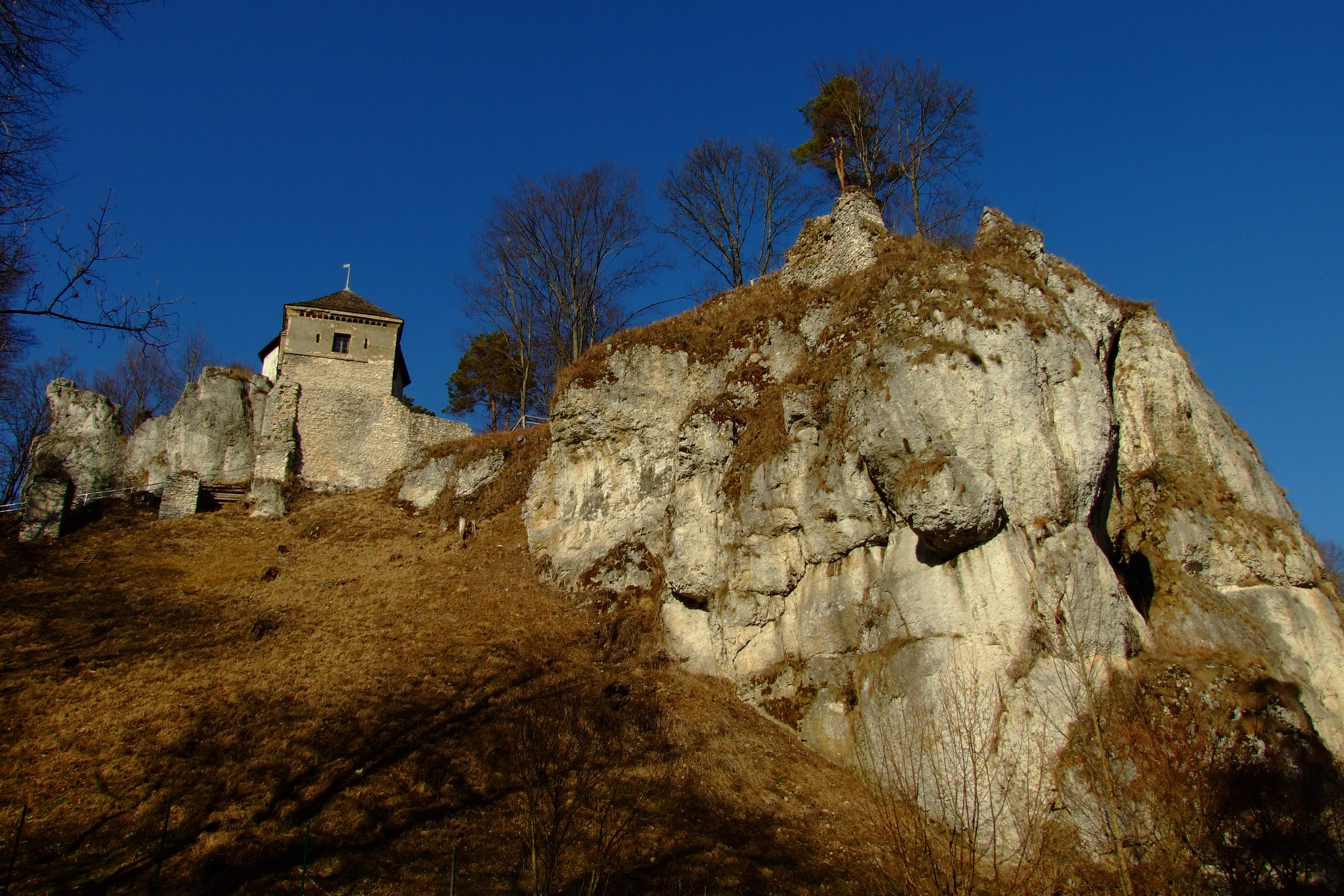
- Ojców Castle

- Location of the Ojców Castle in Poland
- 50°12′43″N 19°49′48″E
- Location: Ojców, Lesser Poland Voivodeship, in Poland

History
- Built: 14th century

Site notes
- Architectural style: Gothic

Ojców Castle (Polish: Zamek Ojców) - a castle located in the Kraków-Częstochowa Upland, part of a system of castles known as the Eagle's Nests (Polish: Orle Gniazda) - formerly protecting the southern border of the Kingdom of Poland; currently housing a museum dedicated to the castle in its renovated castle-tower. The castle is located in the village of Ojców (25 kilometres (16 mi) north of Kraków), Lesser Poland Voivodeship; in Poland.

The castle was used as a stronghold, built by Casimir III the Great in the second half of the fourteenth century.

The castle is located in the Ojcowski National Park.

== History ==
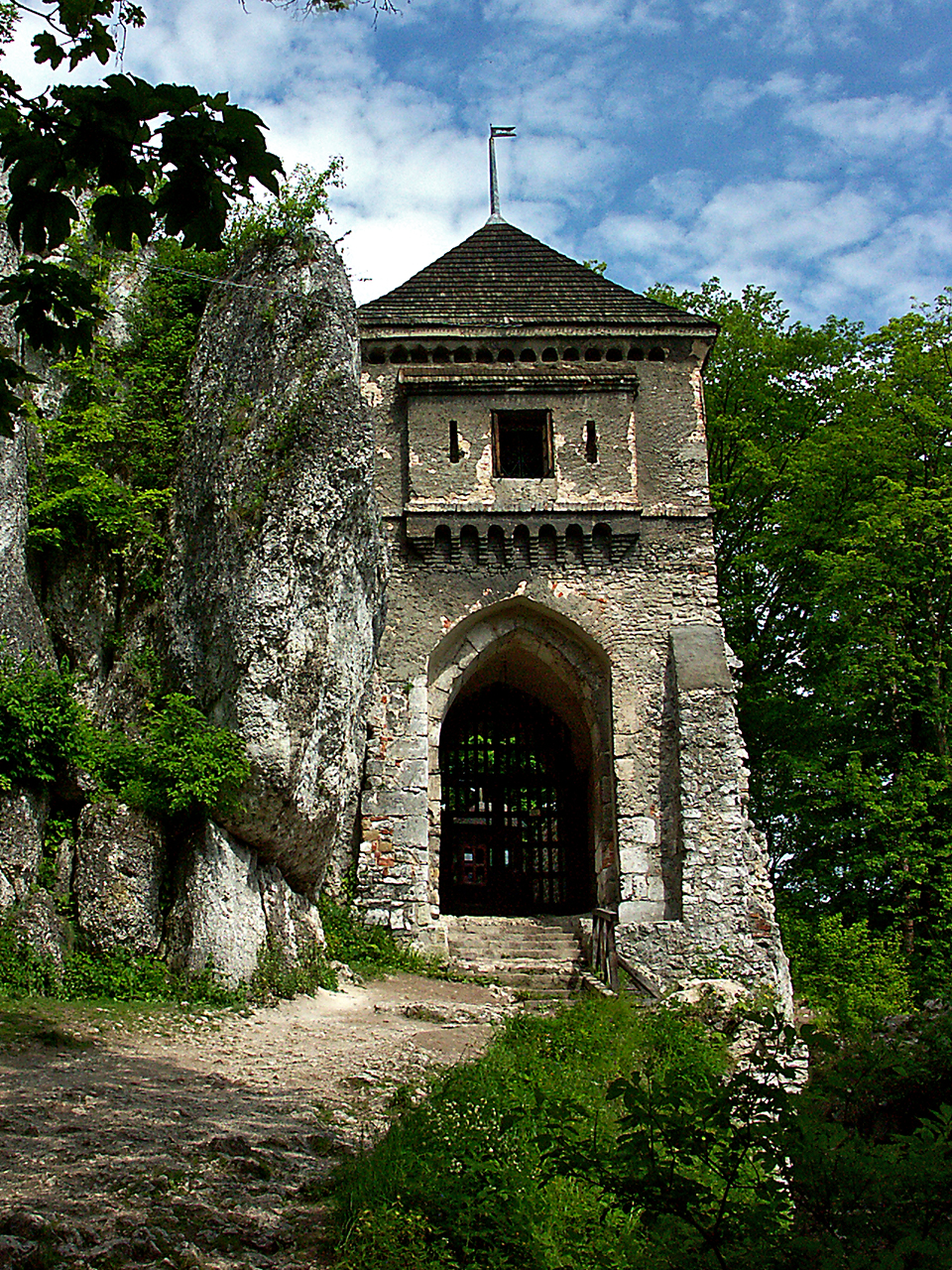
Castle in Ojców - gatehouse

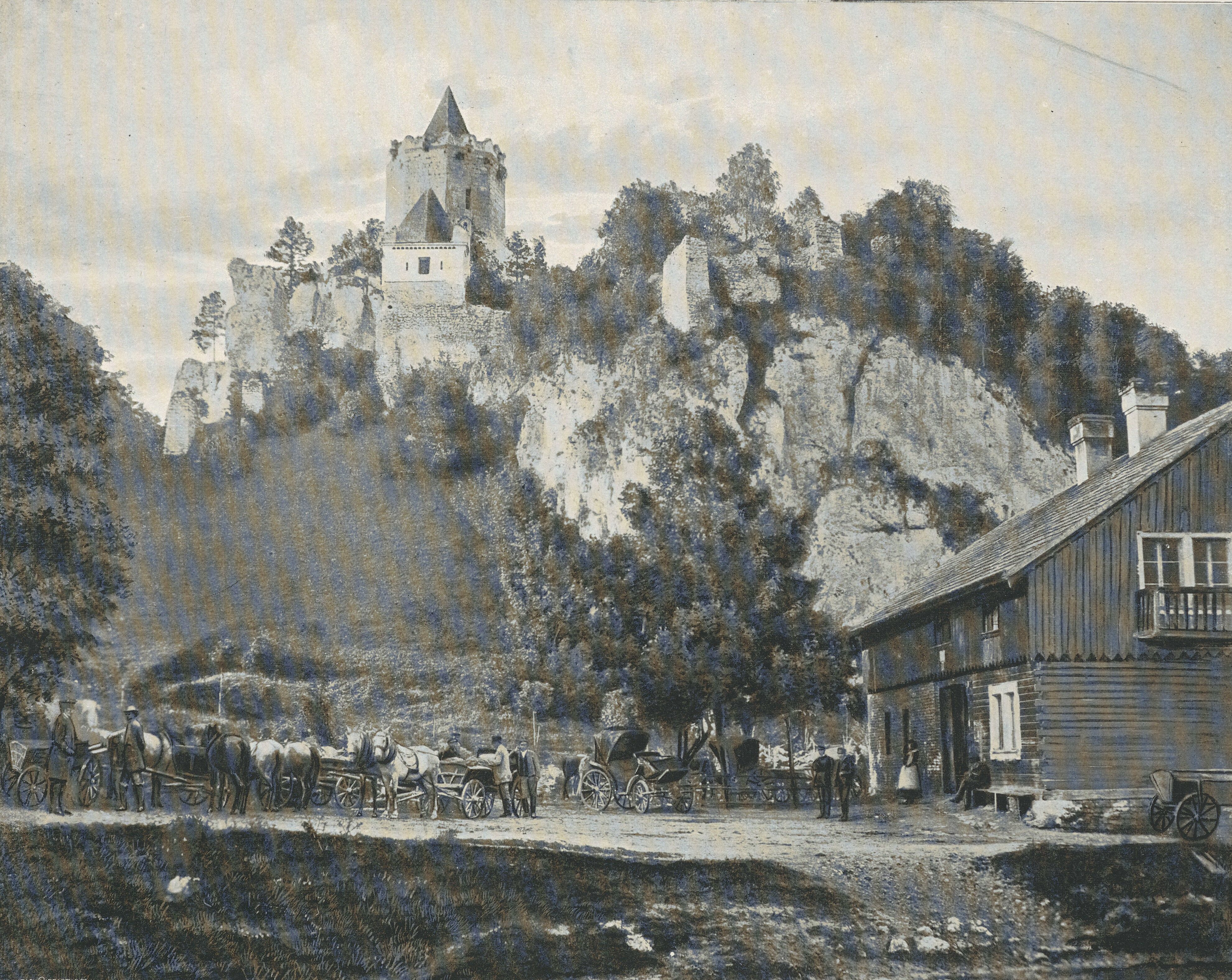
View of the castle before 1899

A legend mentions, that the caste was built by the Duke of Wrocław Wiesław I, Popiel's brother-in-law, however the first recorded information about the castle comes from the fourteenth century - linking up with King Casimir III the Great, who used the castle as part of his defensive line against the Kingdom of Bohemia and the south. The King named the castle in honour of his father, Władysław I Łokietek, calling it Father by the Rock (Polish: Ociec u skały). In 1665 the stronghold was taken over by the Swedes, which they partially burned and deconstructed. The House of Koryciński, who owned the castle, had renovated it, and built additional living quarters. Various battles throughout the oncoming centuries had caused the castle to be shifted between different owners. Causing the castle to go through several cycles of renovation and deconstruction, currently the castle stands as the picturesque, and renovated ruin.

Actor and comedian Andrzej Grabowski wrote a statement about his visit:

Jak gniazdo orła wzniesiony na skale

Na niskie chaty spoglądał zuchwale
Pchnął go czas...runął z całą wielmożnością swoją
A wiejskie nędzne chaty jak stały - tak stoją.

(How they raised the eagle's nest on the rock
Which had looked down proudly over the little cottages down below
Time pushed it upwards...then fell with all its might

The village's cottages stood in misery - and continue to do so.)

== See also ==
- Castles in Poland
- Trail of the Eagle's Nests
