= Wólka-Folwark, Podlaskie Voivodeship =

Wólka-Folwark
- Village
- Location within Poland
- Coordinates: 54°03′32″N 22°43′58″E
- Country: Poland
- Voivodeship: Podlaskie
- County: Suwałki
- Gmina: Bakałarzewo

Wólka-Folwark [ˈvulka ˈfɔlvark] is a village in the administrative district of Gmina Bakałarzewo, within Suwałki County, Podlaskie Voivodeship, in north-eastern Poland.
