= Nowa Kamionka, Suwałki County =

Nowa Kamionka
- Village
- Location within Poland
- Coordinates: 54°04′02″N 22°43′20″E
- Country: Poland
- Voivodeship: Podlaskie
- County: Suwałki
- Gmina: Bakałarzewo

Nowa Kamionka [ˈnɔva kaˈmjɔŋka] is a village in the administrative district of Gmina Bakałarzewo, within Suwałki County, Podlaskie Voivodeship, in north-eastern Poland.
