= Wólka, Suwałki County =

Wólka
- Village
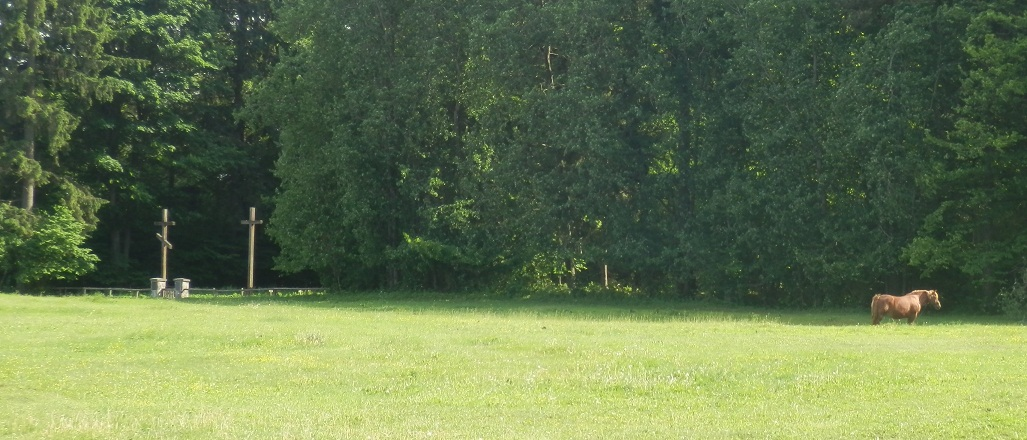

- Location within Poland
- Coordinates: 54°2′38″N 22°44′24″E
- Country: Poland
- Voivodeship: Podlaskie
- County: Suwałki
- Gmina: Bakałarzewo
- Population: 20

Wólka [ˈvulka] is a village in the administrative district of Gmina Bakałarzewo, within Suwałki County, Podlaskie Voivodeship, in north-eastern Poland.
