= Nowa Wieś, Gmina Bakałarzewo =

Nowa Wieś
- Village
- Location within Poland
- Coordinates: 54°4′56″N 22°37′21″E
- Country: Poland
- Voivodeship: Podlaskie
- County: Suwałki
- Gmina: Bakałarzewo

Nowa Wieś [ˈnɔva ˈvjɛɕ] is a village in the administrative district of Gmina Bakałarzewo, within Suwałki County, Podlaskie Voivodeship, in north-eastern Poland.
