= Podgórze, Suwałki County =

Podgórze
- Settlement
- Location within Poland
- Coordinates: 54°7′33″N 22°44′29″E
- Country: Poland
- Voivodeship: Podlaskie
- County: Suwałki
- Gmina: Bakałarzewo
- Population: 40

Podgórze [pɔdˈɡuʐɛ] is a settlement in the administrative district of Gmina Bakałarzewo, within Suwałki County, Podlaskie Voivodeship, in north-eastern Poland.
