= Matłak =

- Village
- Location within Poland
- Coordinates: 54°8′N 22°39′E
- Country: Poland
- Voivodeship: Podlaskie
- County: Suwałki
- Gmina: Bakałarzewo

Matłak [ˈmatwak] is a village in the administrative district of Gmina Bakałarzewo, within Suwałki County, Podlaskie Voivodeship, in north-eastern Poland.
