= Wielkopolska National Park =

National park in Poland

- Wielkopolski Park Narodowy
- IUCN category II (national park)
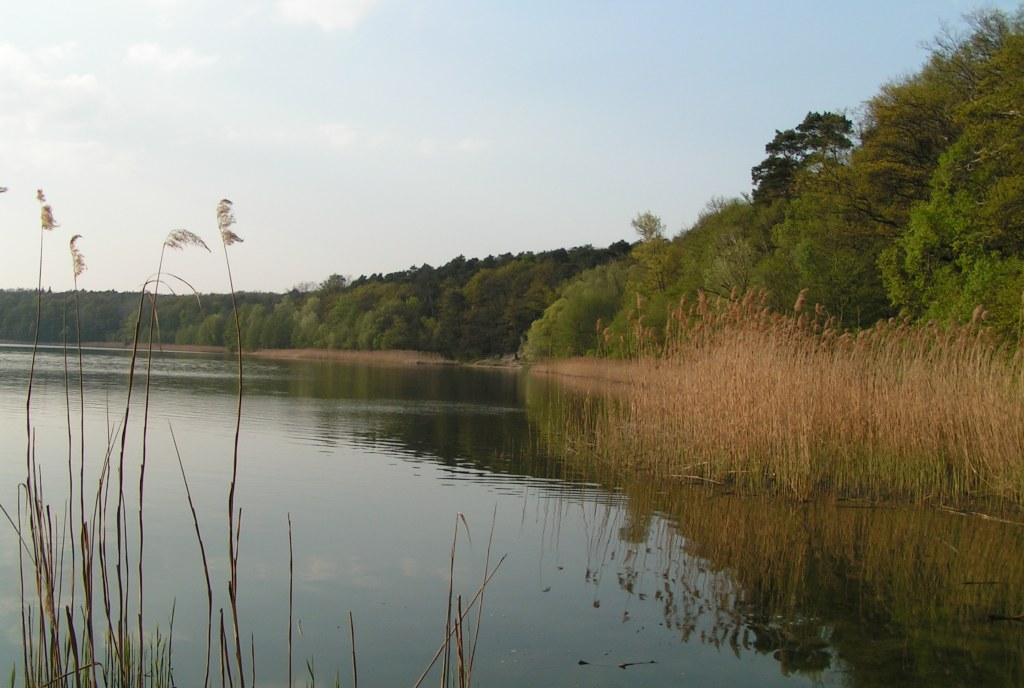
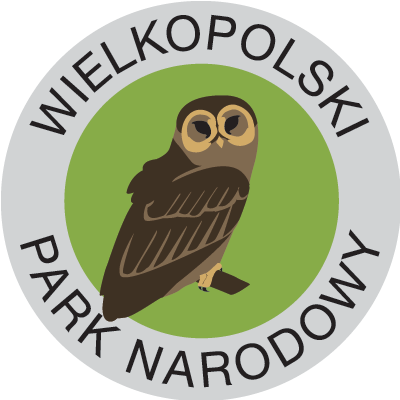
- Góreckie Lake at the Park Park logo

- Location within Poland
- Location: Greater Poland Voivodeship, Poland
- Nearest city: Puszczykowo
- Coordinates: 52°16′N 16°47′E
- Area: 75.84 km^{2} (29.28 sq mi)
- Established: 1957
- Visitors: about 1 000 000
- Governing body: Ministry of the Environment
- Website: Official website

Wielkopolska National Park, also known as Wielkopolski National Park or Greater Poland National Park or the National Park of Greater Poland (Polish: Wielkopolski Park Narodowy), is a National Park within the Wielkopolska (Greater Poland) region of west-central Poland, about 15 km (9 mi) south of the regional capital, Poznań. It gets its unique nature from post-glacial lakes surrounded by dense forests. Together with its protective zone, it includes part of the Poznań Lakeland (Pojezierze Poznańskie) and parts of Poznań's Warta Gorge (Poznański Przełom Warty).

The national park has its headquarters in the village of Jeziory.

== History ==
Created in 1957 on an area of 52.44 km^{2} (20 sq mi), the Park currently covers 75.84 km^{2} (29 sq mi), of which over half (46.17 km^{2}) is forested. Waters (mainly small lakes) cover 4.62 km^{2} (2 sq mi), and other types of land 25.05 km^{2} (10 sq mi). The Park contains 18 strictly protected areas.

The idea of creating a preserve here was first raised by Professor A. Wodziczko in 1922. After 10 years of efforts, in 1932 two reserves were created: the first at Puszczykowo (original area 2.39 km^{2}), and the second around Kociołek lake (1.89 km^{2}). In 1933 on the hilltop of Osowa Góra a symbolic opening of the Wielkopolska National Park took place, however the Park was not officially created until 1957.

== Landscape ==
The landscape of the Park was strongly influenced by a glacier, which covered this area 70-10 thousand years ago. It is mainly flat - its highest hill - Osowa Góra, reaches only 132 m (433 ft) above sea level. The Park is split by several tunnel-valley lakes, which were created by the glacier. Among them there is one regarded as the most beautiful - Góreckie Lake, with two islands.

Of other interesting land formations, one must emphasize numerous, round hills as well as long, narrow hills which resemble rail mounds. Also, there are huge rocks, the biggest of which - Głaz Leśników, is regarded as a nature's monument and as such is protected.

== Plants ==
The main element of Park's flora are species of Euro-Syberian kind, like pine (making up 70% of Park's forests) as well as other forest plants. Soil here is of poor quality, only around waters it is better which enables plant life there to be more heterogeneous. Unique in its character is Skrzynka Lake, which is partly covered by a thick layer of peat-bogs.

== Animals ==
Park's fauna is characterized by richness of kinds, the best represented are insects with more than 3 thousand species. Forests are full of beets, also very rich is the world of spiders. In lakes, there are several fish - trout, pike and eel. In Park thrive all kinds of amphibians which can be met on Polish plains and 5 species of reptiles, including lizards and grass-snake. Also, there are around 190 species of birds, with black woodpecker and buzzard. Mammals are represented by 40 species, with numerous kinds of bats.

== Human habitation ==
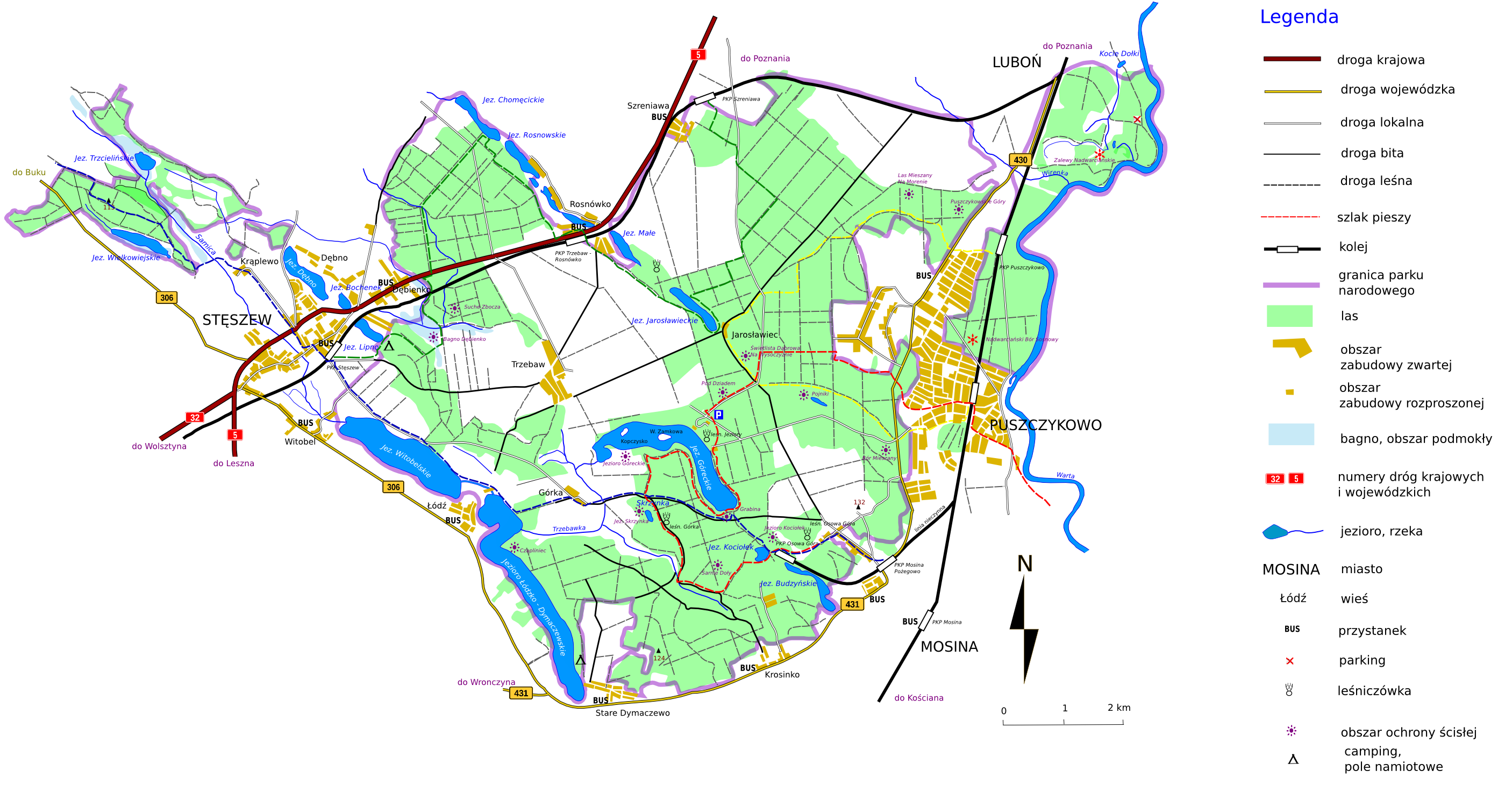
Map of the National Park

Among most precious monuments there are: a wooden church in Łódź (17th century), churches in Komorniki, Puszczykowo, Stęszew and Wiry. At Szreniawa and at Trzebaw there are 19th-century manor houses. Interesting relic are ruins of a castle built in 1827 by Tytus Działyński on the Zamkowa Island on Góreckie Lake.

The Park is visited by more than a million tourists a year. It is crossed by 7 tourist trails and the richness of its fauna and flora is presented in Ośrodek Muzealno-Dydaktyczny Wielkopolskiego Parku Narodowego (Wielkopolska National Park Museum and Educational Center) in Jeziory.
