= Kotowina =

- Village
- Location within Poland
- Coordinates: 54°4′N 22°41′E
- Country: Poland
- Voivodeship: Podlaskie
- County: Suwałki
- Gmina: Bakałarzewo
- Time zone: UTC+1 (CET)
  - Summer (DST): UTC+2 (CEST)
- Vehicle registration: BSU

Kotowina [kɔtɔˈvina] is a village in the administrative district of Gmina Bakałarzewo, within Suwałki County, Podlaskie Voivodeship, in north-eastern Poland.

The Ruda Nature Reserve is located north of the village.

== History ==
During the German occupation of Poland (World War II), in 1944, German troops carried out expulsions of Poles, and burned one physically disabled man alive (see Nazi crimes against the Polish nation).
