= Stary Folwark, Podlaskie Voivodeship =

Stary Folwark
- Village
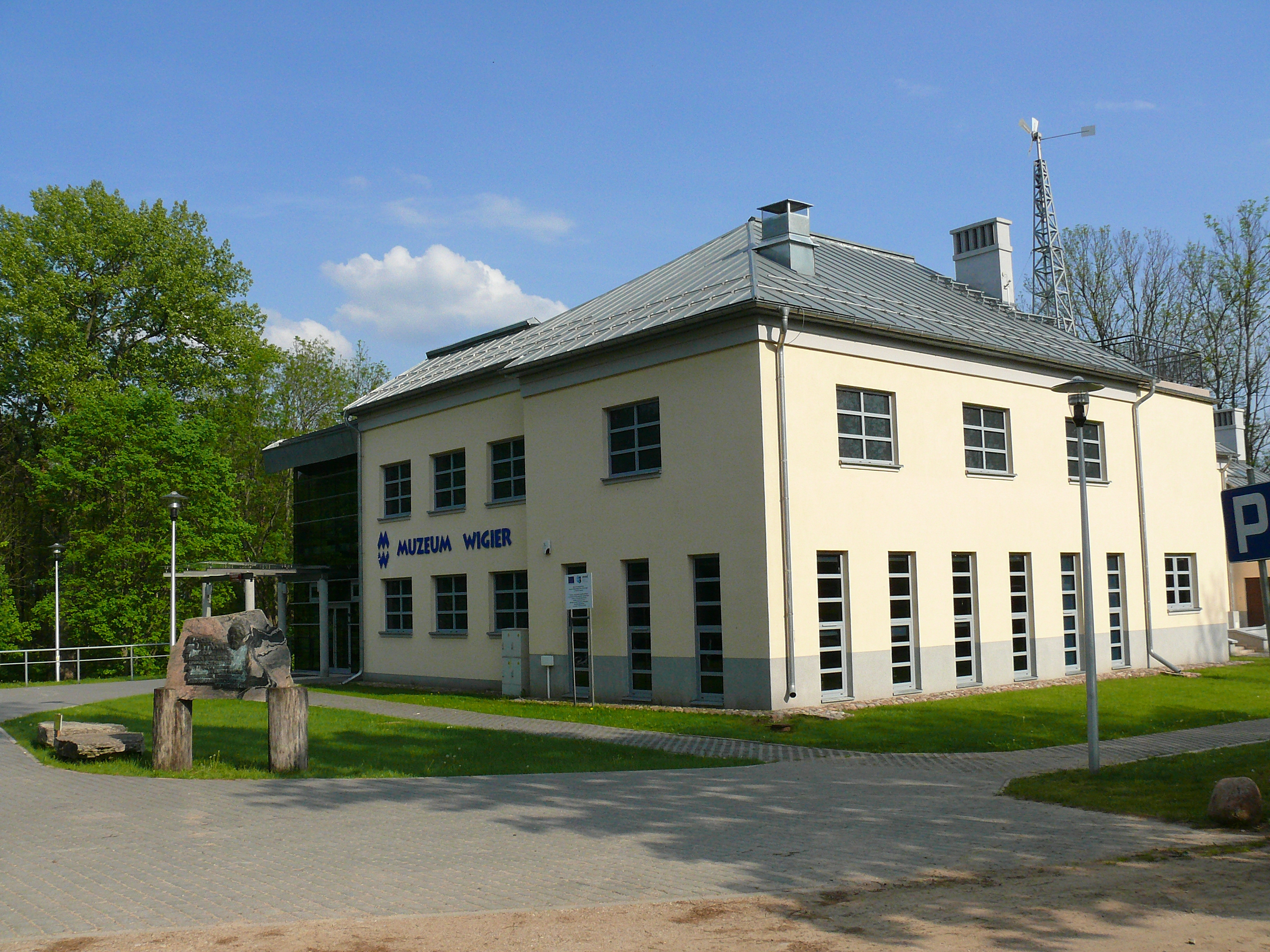
- Museum in Stary Folwark

- Location within Poland
- Coordinates: 54°4′34″N 23°4′32″E
- Country: Poland
- Voivodeship: Podlaskie
- County: Suwałki
- Gmina: Suwałki
- Time zone: UTC+1 (CET)
  - Summer (DST): UTC+2 (CEST)
- Vehicle registration: BSU

Stary Folwark [ˈstarɨ ˈfɔlvark] is a village in the administrative district of Gmina Suwałki, within Suwałki County, Podlaskie Voivodeship, in north-eastern Poland.

During the German occupation of Poland (World War II), in 1939, Polish parish priest from Bakałarzewo Antoni Romuald Jałbrzykowski was briefly imprisoned in the village by the Germans before he was moved to the prison in Suwałki and eventually murdered in the forest near the village of Krzywe, as part of the Intelligenzaktion.
