= Bakałarzewo =

- Village
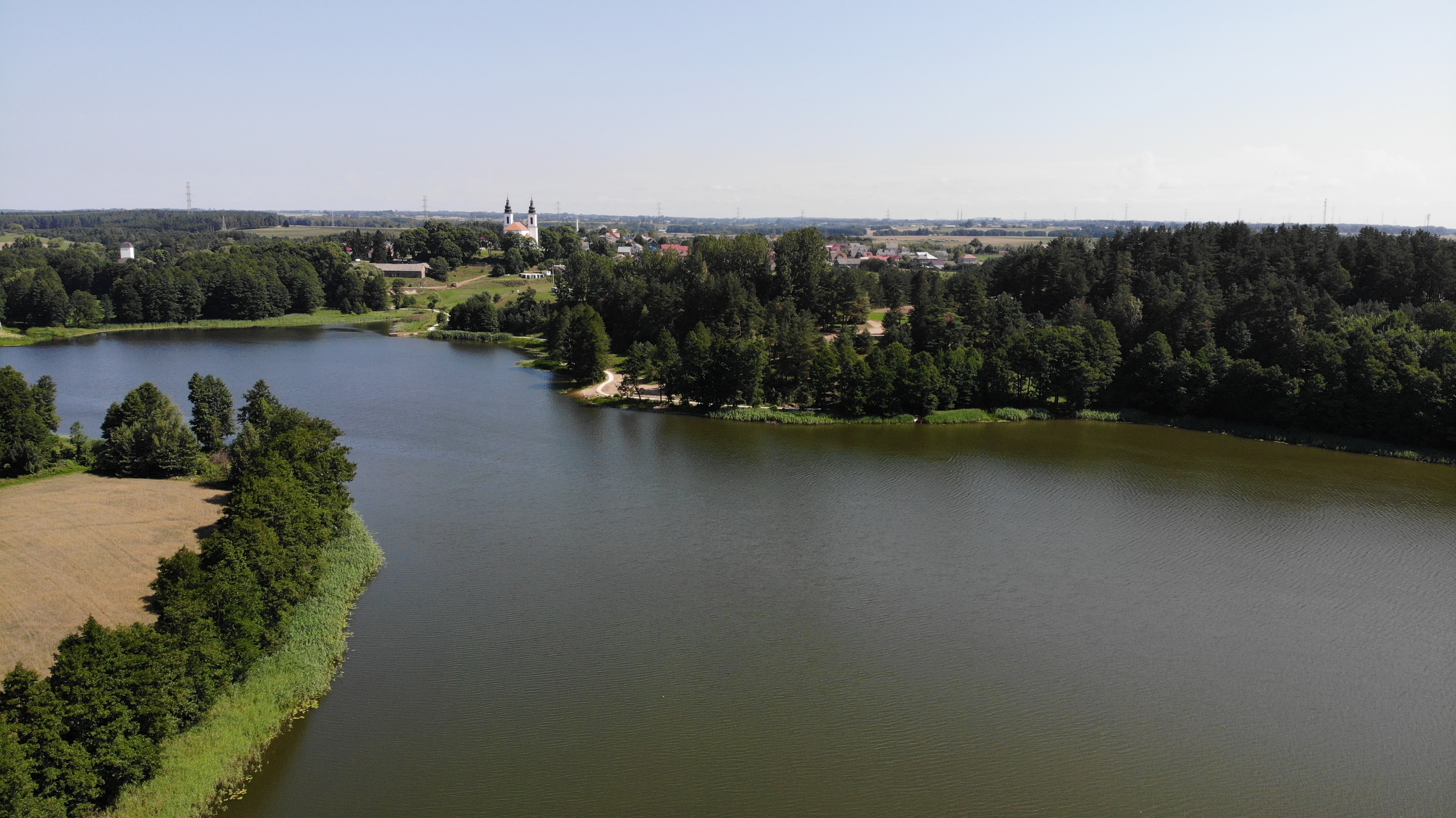
- Sumowo Bakałarzewskie Lake with the Saint James church in the background

- Coat of arms

- Location within Poland
- Coordinates: 54°5′16″N 22°38′35″E
- Country: Poland
- Voivodeship: Podlaskie
- County: Suwałki
- Gmina: Bakałarzewo
- Established: 16th century
- Named for: Mikołaj Michnowicz Raczkowicz Bakałarz

Population
  - Total: 820
- Time zone: UTC+1 (CET)
  - Summer (DST): UTC+2 (CEST)
- Vehicle registration: BSU
- Website: https://www.bakalarzewo.pl

Bakałarzewo ([bakawaˈʐɛvɔ]; Lithuanian: Bakalariava) is a village in Suwałki County, Podlaskie Voivodeship, in north-eastern Poland. It is the seat of the gmina (administrative district) called Gmina Bakałarzewo.

While currently a village, Bakałarzewo is set to be granted civic rights on 1 January 2027, being one of three villages in Podlaskie to do so, alongside Filipów and Mielnik.

== History ==
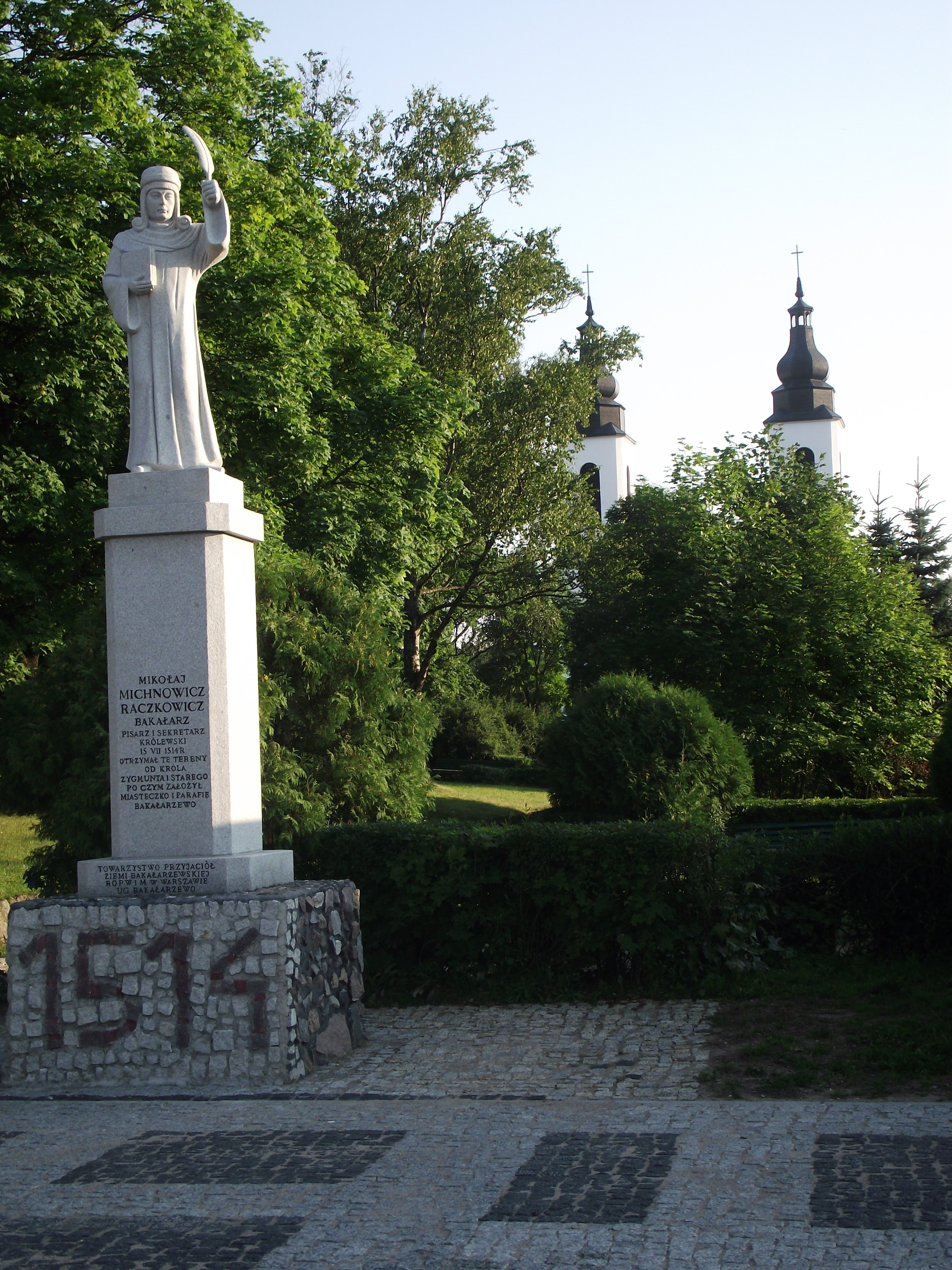
Monument of Mikołaj Michnowicz Raczkowicz Bakałarz, the founder of Bakałarzewo

Bakałarzewo was founded in the early 16th century, among dense forests of the Grand Duchy of Lithuania within the Polish–Lithuanian union. At that time, it was called Dowspuda Bakałarzewska or Bakałarszczyzna, but by the second half of the 16th century, it was commonly called Bakałarzewo. It owes its name to the nickname of Mikolaj “Bakałarz” Michnowicz Raczkowicz, royal writer and one of founders of the town.

By 1558 Bakałarzewo had already had a town charter, with a mayor, a vogt and a starosta. In 1609, local nobleman Mikołaj Wolski funded an altar for the town church: the altar still exists. In the 17th, 18th and 19th centuries Bakalarzewo remained a small, private town.

In the Third Partition of Poland it was annexed by the Kingdom of Prussia (1795), then it was regained by Poles and included within the short-lived Duchy of Warsaw (1807), within which it was administratively located in the Łomża Department, and after the Congress of Vienna (1815) it became part of Russian-controlled Congress Poland, where it remained until World War I. In 1870, as a punishment for the January Uprising, Russian authorities reduced Bakałarzewo to the status of a village. In the early 20th century, Bakałarzewo had a population of 2,000, with a large Jewish community.

Bakałarzewo was restored to Poland, when the country regained independence after World War I in 1918. In the Second Polish Republic, the village belonged to the Białystok Voivodeship. In 1927, a new school complex was built, in 1936 a new church, and in 1937, an office building by the market square.

During World War II nearly 90% of all Bakałarzewo buildings were destroyed by 1945. During the German occupation, the Germans arrested the local parish priest Antoni Romuald Jałbrzykowski in late 1939, then imprisoned him in Stary Folwark and Suwałki until January 1940 and murdered him in the forest near the village of Krzywe. Young Polish priest Kazimierz Hamerszmit was arrested in April 1940, and then imprisoned in the Soldau, Sachsenhausen and Dachau concentration camps, however, he survived and eventually returned to Poland. The Germans operated two labour camps of the Reich Labour Service in Bakałarzewo. Bakałarzewo was an important center of the Home Army, and on 25 May 1944, German soldiers killed 12 Home Army members (see Nazi crimes against the Polish nation). The village has preserved World War II bunkers now housing a museum.

Afterwards, the village was restored to Poland, although with a Soviet-installed communist regime, which stayed in power until the Fall of Communism in the 1980s. The Polish anti-communist resistance was active in Bakałarzewo, and in 1945 it raided a local communist police station.

== Sources ==
- VLKK (2002). "Atvirkštinis lietuvių kalboje vartojamų tradicinių Lenkijos vietovardžių formų sąrašas" (PDF). VLKK (in Lithuanian). Archived from the original (PDF) on 2012-02-14.
