= Nowy Dwór, Suwałki County =

Nowy Dwór
- Village
- Location within Poland
- Coordinates: 54°02′54″N 22°40′13″E
- Country: Poland
- Voivodeship: Podlaskie
- County: Suwałki
- Gmina: Bakałarzewo

Nowy Dwór [ˈnɔvɨ ˈdvur] is a village in the administrative district of Gmina Bakałarzewo, within Suwałki County, Podlaskie Voivodeship, in north-eastern Poland.
