= Płociczno, Podlaskie Voivodeship =

Płociczno
- Village
- Location within Poland
- Coordinates: 54°3′N 22°47′E
- Country: Poland
- Voivodeship: Podlaskie
- County: Suwałki
- Gmina: Bakałarzewo
- Population: 120

Płociczno [pwɔˈt͡ɕit͡ʂnɔ] is a village in the administrative district of Gmina Bakałarzewo, within Suwałki County, Podlaskie Voivodeship, in north-eastern Poland.
