= Ojców =

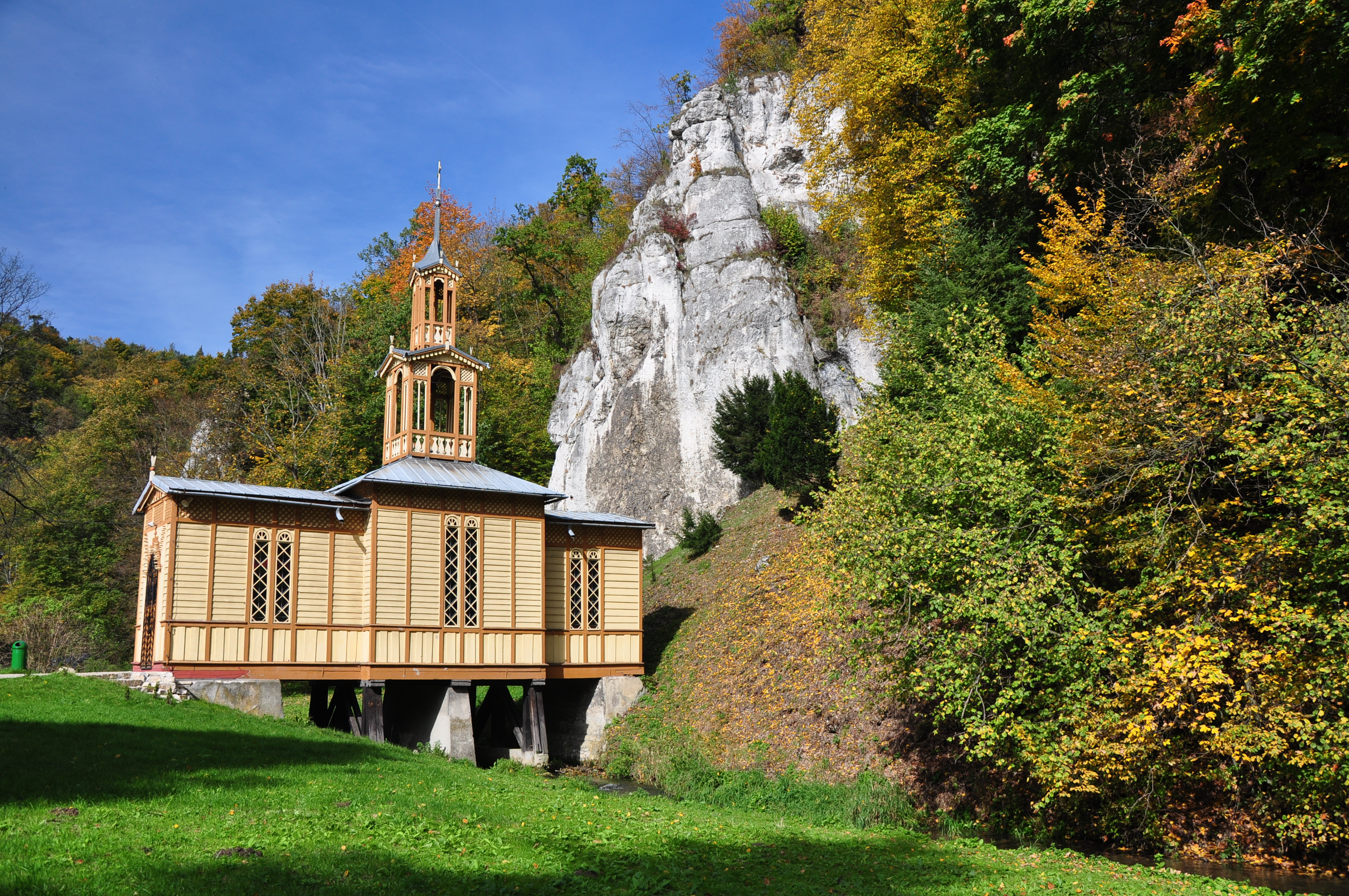
- Chapel "On Water" in Ojców, 1901

- Location within Poland
- Coordinates: 50°12′24″N 19°49′45″E
- Country: Poland
- Voivodeship: Lesser Poland
- County: Kraków
- Gmina: Skała

Area
  - Total: 9.71 km^{2} (3.75 sq mi)

Population (2006)
  - Total: 220
  - Density: 23/km^{2} (59/sq mi)
- Time zone: UTC+1 (CET)
  - Summer (DST): UTC+2 (CEST)
- Postal code: 32-047
- Area code: +48 12
- Car plates: KRA
- Website: www.ojcow.pl

Ojców [ˈɔi̯t͡suf] is a village in Gmina Skała, in Kraków County, Lesser Poland Voivodeship, in southern Poland. It is one of the sights of the Eagle Nests Trail (Szlak Orlich Gniazd), as there are the ruins of a gothic castle near the village. The village is where the authorities of the Ojców National Park (the smallest of Poland's 23 national parks) have their headquarters.

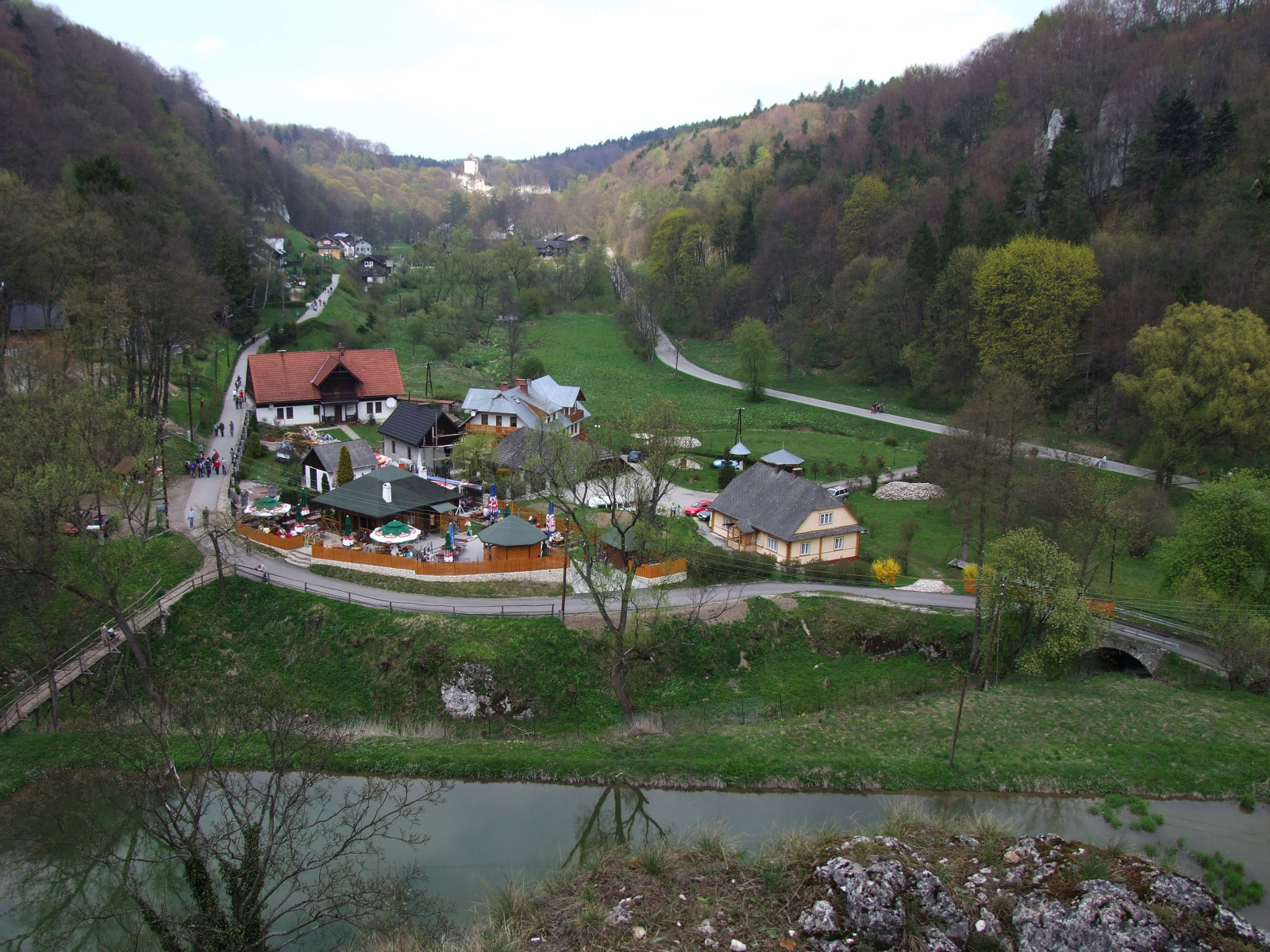
Prądnik river valley outside Ojców village, part of the Ojców National Park and castle located nearby
