= Podwólczanka =

Village in Gmina Bakałarzewo, Poland

- Village
- Location within Poland
- Coordinates: 54°03′34″N 22°44′50″E
- Country: Poland
- Voivodeship: Podlaskie
- County: Suwałki
- Gmina: Bakałarzewo
- Population: 28

Podwólczanka [pɔdvulˈt͡ʂaŋka] is a village in the administrative district of Gmina Bakałarzewo, within Suwałki County, Podlaskie Voivodeship, in north-eastern Poland.
