= Stara Kamionka, Suwałki County =

Stara Kamionka
- Village
- Location within Poland
- Coordinates: 54°04′16″N 22°41′13″E
- Country: Poland
- Voivodeship: Podlaskie
- County: Suwałki
- Gmina: Bakałarzewo

Stara Kamionka [ˈstara kaˈmjɔŋka] is a village in the administrative district of Gmina Bakałarzewo, within Suwałki County, Podlaskie Voivodeship, in north-eastern Poland.
