= Gmina Bakałarzewo =

Gmina Bakałarzewo Bakałarzewo Commune
- Gmina
- Coat of arms

- Gmina Bakałarzewo within the Suwałki County
- Coordinates (Bakałarzewo): 54°5′16″N 22°38′35″E
- Country: Poland
- Voivodeship: Podlaskie
- County: Suwałki County
- Seat: Bakałarzewo

Area
  - Total: 123.01 km^{2} (47.49 sq mi)

Population (2006)
  - Total: 3,053
  - Density: 24.82/km^{2} (64.28/sq mi)
- Website: https://www.bakalarzewo.pl/

Gmina Bakałarzewo is a rural gmina (administrative district) in Suwałki County, Podlaskie Voivodeship, in north-eastern Poland. Its seat is the village of Bakałarzewo, which lies approximately 19 kilometres (12 mi) west of Suwałki and 114 km (71 mi) north of the regional capital Białystok.

The gmina covers an area of 123.01 square kilometres (47.5 sq mi), and as of 2006 its total population is 3,053.

== Villages ==
Gmina Bakałarzewo contains the villages and settlements of Aleksandrowo, Bakałarzewo, Gębalówka, Góra, Kamionka Poprzeczna, Karasiewo, Klonowa Góra, Konopki, Kotowina, Malinówka, Maryna, Matłak, Nieszki, Nowa Kamionka, Nowa Wieś, Nowy Dwór, Nowy Skazdub, Orłowo, Płociczno, Podgórze, Podrabalina, Podwólczanka, Sadłowina, Słupie, Sokołowo, Stara Chmielówka, Stara Kamionka, Stary Skazdub, Suchorzec, Wólka, Wólka-Folwark, Zajączkowo, Zajączkowo-Folwark and Zdręby.

== Neighbouring gminas ==
Gmina Bakałarzewo is bordered by the gminas of Filipów, Olecko, Raczki, Suwałki and Wieliczki.

== Sister cities ==
- Attert (Belgium) since 2005
