= Nowy Skazdub =

- Village
- Location within Poland
- Coordinates: 54°07′17″N 22°41′29″E
- Country: Poland
- Voivodeship: Podlaskie
- County: Suwałki
- Gmina: Bakałarzewo

Nowy Skazdub [ˈnɔvɨ ˈskazdup] is a village in the administrative district of Gmina Bakałarzewo, within Suwałki County, Podlaskie Voivodeship, in north-eastern Poland.
