= Puszczykowo =

Town in Greater Poland Voivodeship, Poland

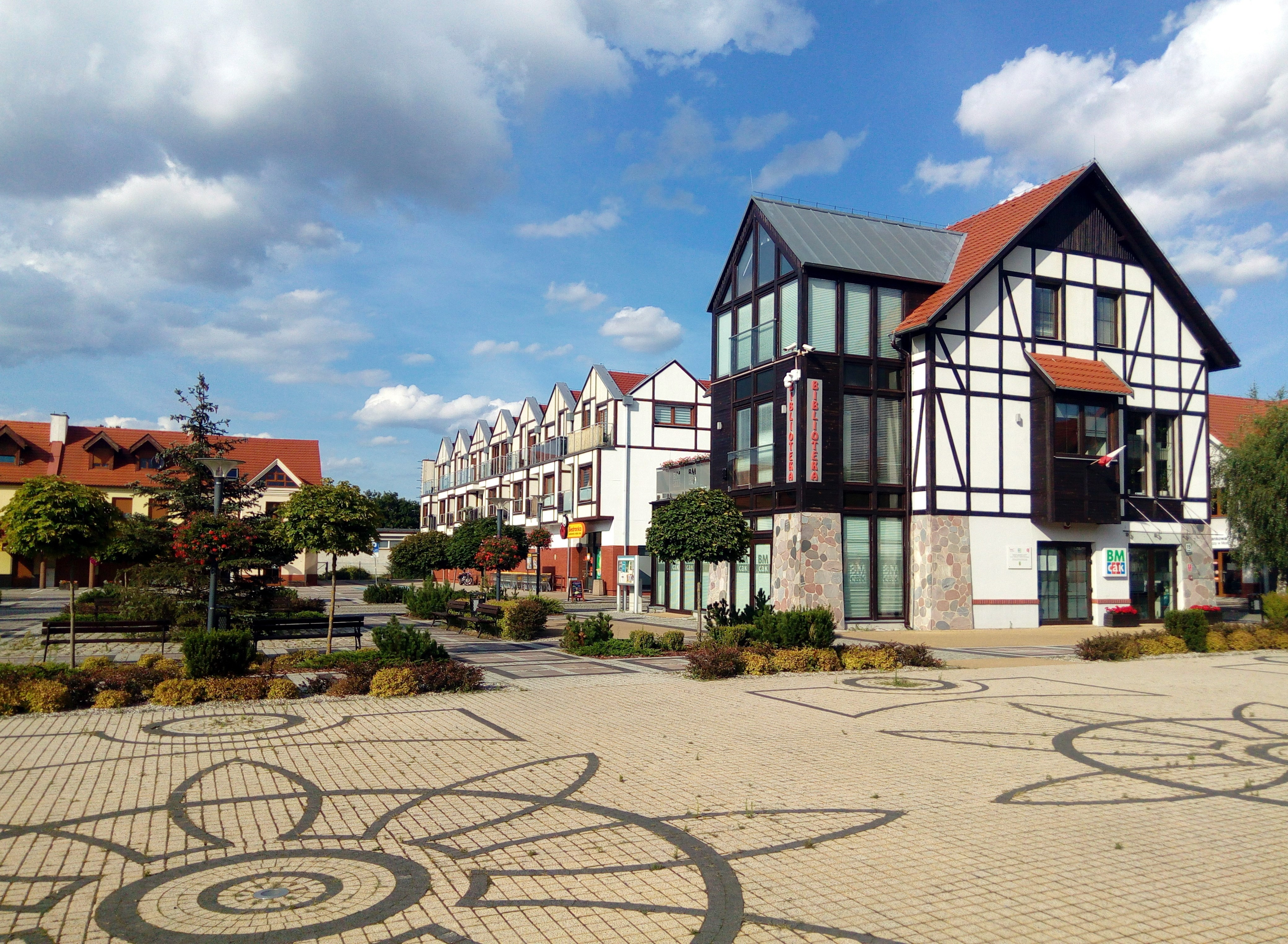
- Market square

- Coat of arms

- Location within Poland
- Coordinates: 52°16′54″N 16°51′15″E
- Country: Poland
- Voivodeship: Greater Poland
- County: Poznań
- Gmina: Puszczykowo (urban gmina)

Area
  - Total: 16.65 km^{2} (6.43 sq mi)

Population (2011)
  - Total: 9,756
  - Density: 585.9/km^{2} (1,518/sq mi)
- Time zone: UTC+1 (CET)
  - Summer (DST): UTC+2 (CEST)
- Postal code: 62-040 and 62-041
- Climate: Cfb
- Website: www.puszczykowo.pl

Puszczykowo [puʂt͡ʂɨˈkɔvɔ] is a town in Poznań County, in the Poznań metropolitan area, in the Greater Poland Voivodeship, in west-central Poland, with 9,331 inhabitants (as of 2015). It is located about 12 km (7.46 mi) south of Poznań, the area is surrounded by the Wielkopolski National Park (located within the park buffer zone).

== History ==
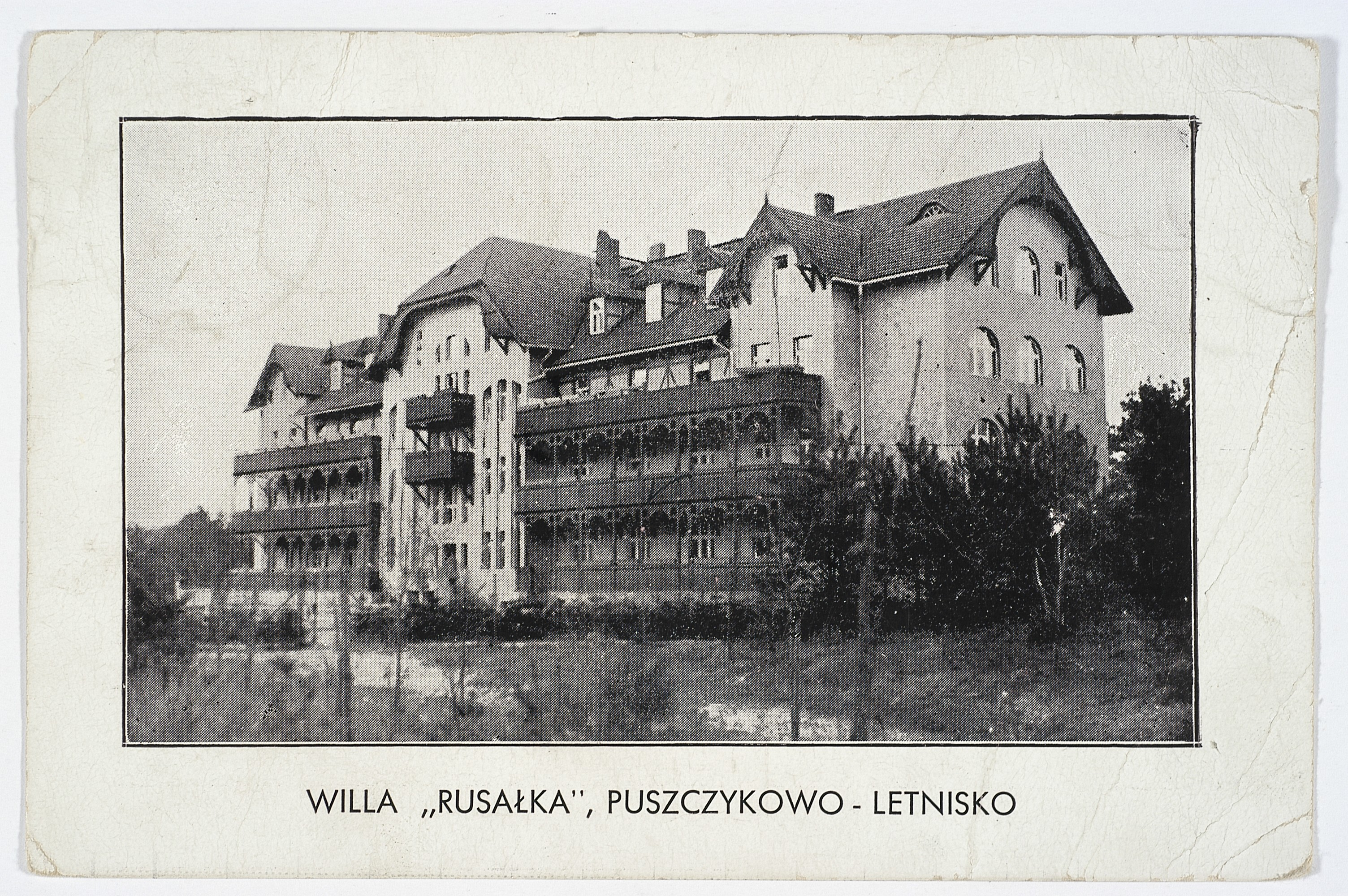
Villa Rusałka in 1935

The first time Puszczykowo name appears in written sources in the form of Posczucowo was in 1387, although Niwka, a settlement within the town limits was mentioned as early as 1302. Residential buildings, characteristic of present-day town date from the close of the 19th century. The railway line leading to Wrocław and station building were built in 1856. In the interwar period the excursion traffic on Sundays and holidays was so great that trains from Poznań ran every 10 minutes. To avoid interference with the long-distance traffic an additional track had to be built for them.

Following the German-Soviet invasion of Poland, which started World War II in September 1939, Puszczykowo was occupied by Germany until 1945. The local wójt (head of administration), two police officers and an officer of the Polish Army from Puszczykowo were murdered by the Russians in the Katyn massacre in 1940.

In the 1950s the steamboat, "Janek Krasicki", in later years, motorboat "Dziwożona" cruised from Poznań to Puszczykowo. The mayor of the town between 1968–84 was Wladyslaw Krzyżański. In those years, many public buildings were built. From 1975 to 1998 the town administratively belonged to the regional capital Poznań. In the 1970s, on Warta fields a hospital was built. Since 1998, a tourist route, called the Kórnik Route was established in Puszczykowo. In 2012 tennis player Angelique Kerber moved to Puszczykowo.

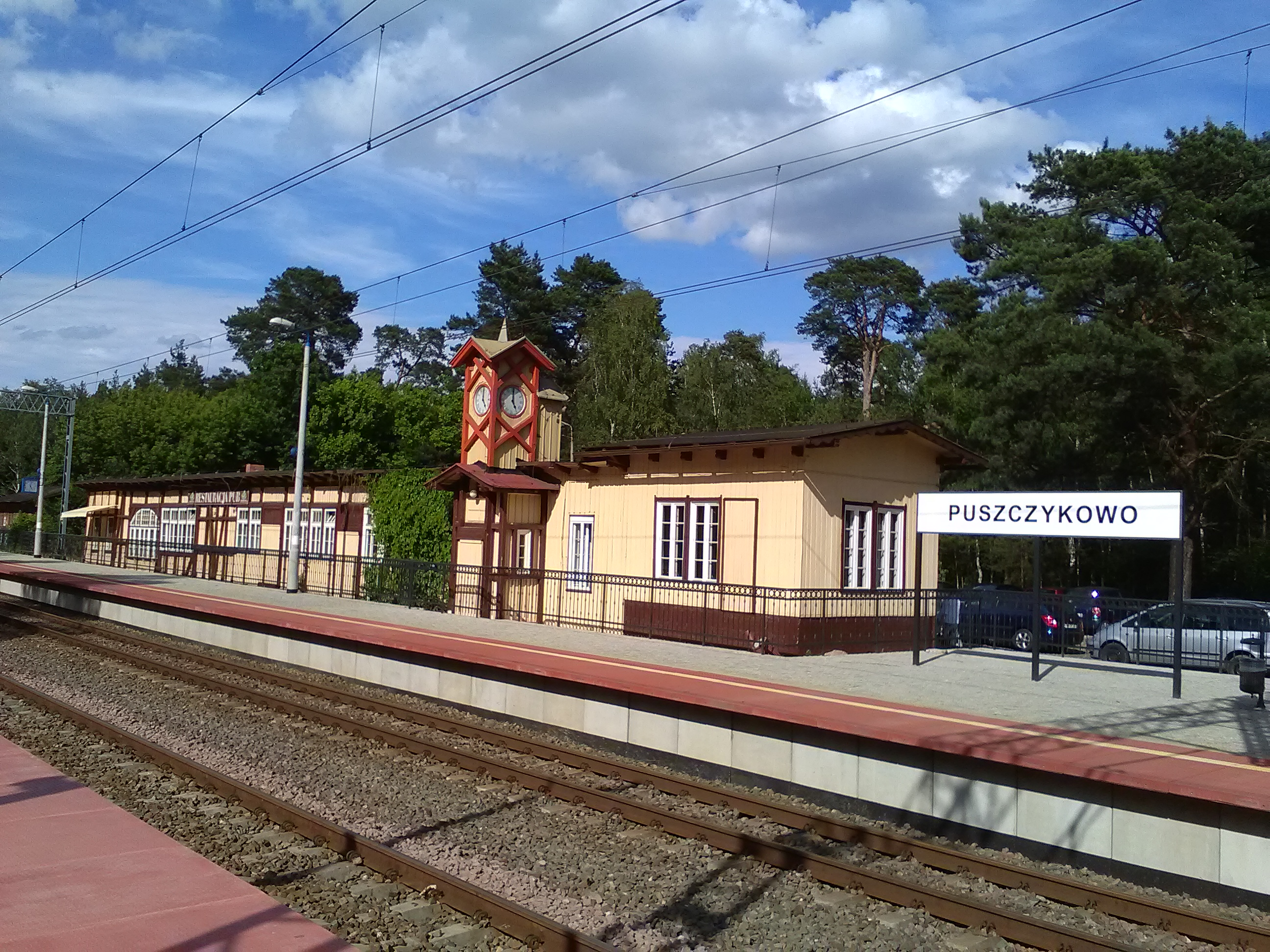
Puszczykowo's train station

== Education ==
The town offers education in two primary schools and a secondary school.

== Notable residents ==
- Cyryl Ratajski (1875-1942), President of the City of Poznań, Minister of Internal Affairs, Delegate of the Polish government-in-exile
- Arkady Fiedler (1894-1985), Polish writer, journalist and adventurer
- Angelique Kerber (born 1988), tennis player

== Sister cities ==
- Châteaugiron, France
