= Ojców National Park =

National park in Poland

- Polish: Ojcowski Park Narodowy
- IUCN category II (national park)
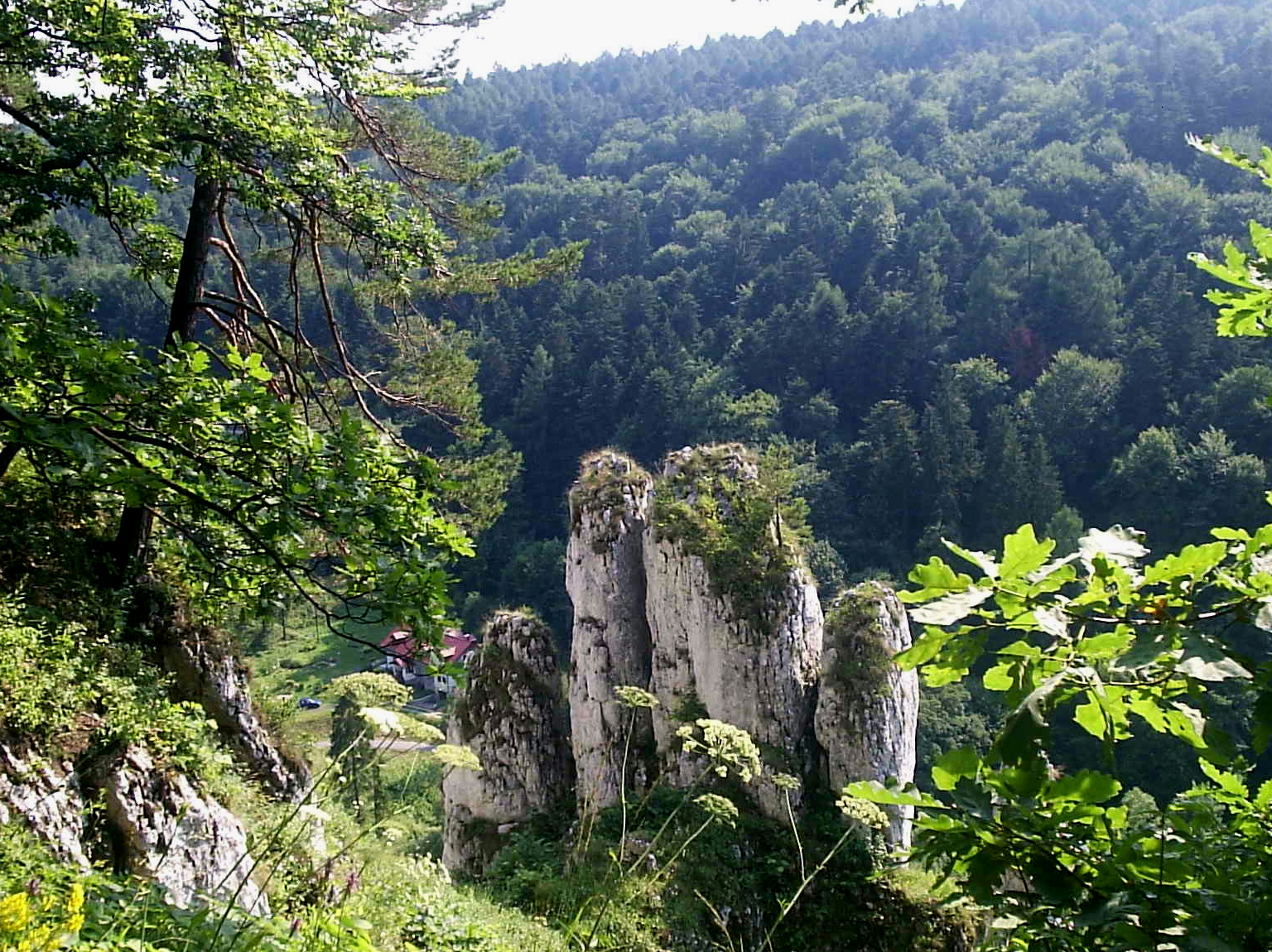
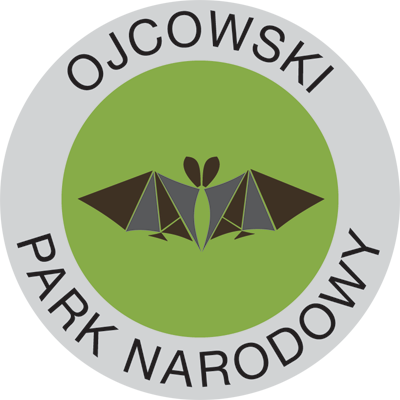
- Skała Biała Ręka (the White Hand rock) Park logo with Bat

- Location within Poland
- Location: Lesser Poland Voivodeship, Poland
- Nearest city: Ojców
- Coordinates: 50°12′24″N 19°49′45″E
- Area: 21.46 km^{2} (8.29 sq mi)
- Established: 1956
- Governing body: Ministry of the Environment
- Website: Official website

Ojców National Park (Polish: Ojcowski Park Narodowy) is a national park in Kraków County, Lesser Poland Voivodeship in southern Poland, established in 1956. It takes its name from the village of Ojców, where it also has its headquarters. Chopin visited Ojców in 1829.

It is Poland's smallest national park, with an original area of 14.40 square kilometers (5.56 sq mi), since expanded to 21.46 km^{2} (8.29 sq mi). Of this area, 15.28 km^{2} (5.90 sq mi) is forested and 2.51 km^{2} (0.97 sq mi) is strictly protected. The park lies 16 kilometers (10 mi) north of Kraków, in the Jurassic Kraków-Częstochowa Upland.

== Geography ==
Karst topography of soluble bedrock characterizes the park, which in addition to two river (the Prądnik and Saspówka) valleys contains numerous limestone cliffs, ravines, and over 400 caves. The largest of these, Łokietek's Cave (said to have sheltered King Władysław I Łokietek, for whom it was named), is 320 meters (1,050 ft) deep. The area is also noted for its rock formations, the most famous being Hercules' Club, a 25-meter (82 ft)-high limestone column.

Ojcowski Park is very biodiverse; over 5500 species reside in the park. These include 4600 species of insects (including 1700 of beetles and 1075 of butterflies) and 135 of birds. Mammals include the beaver, badger, ermine, and 15 species of bats, many of which hibernate in the park's caves during the winter.

=== Waters ===
The water network in its present shape developed in the end of the Tertiary period as a result of deep erosion of streams. The main watercourse is the Pradnik. Its tributary in the Park is the Saspowka. The streams are supplied with water from about 20 springs in karst cracks, called "wywierzyska" (rising springs).

== Human habitation and culture ==
The earliest settlement in the area dates to the Paleolithic, approximately 120,000 years ago. The Ojców region is rich in flint, which attracted early humans.

The park contains numerous castles, including a ruined Gothic castle at Ojców and a better-preserved Renaissance castle at Pieskowa Skała, both on the tourist Trail of the Eagles' Nests. There are two museums in the park, the Professor Władyslaw Szafer Museum (named for the first person to advocate the creation of a national park in the Ojców area), and a branch of the Kraków-based National Art Collection, located in the Pieskowa Skała castle.

== See also ==
- National Parks of Poland
- Białowieża National Park
- Tunel Wielki

== Gallery ==
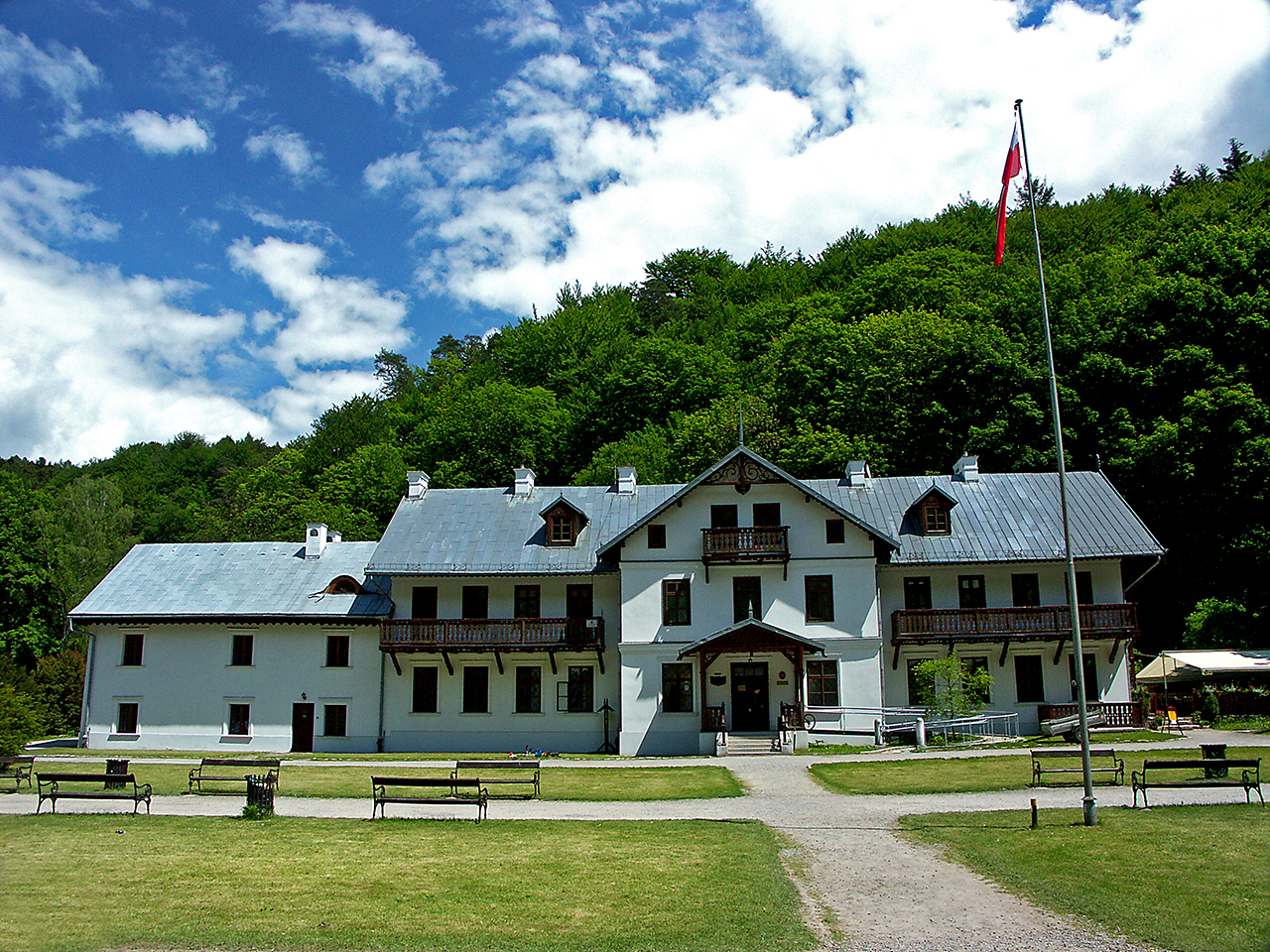
Ojców National Park Museum

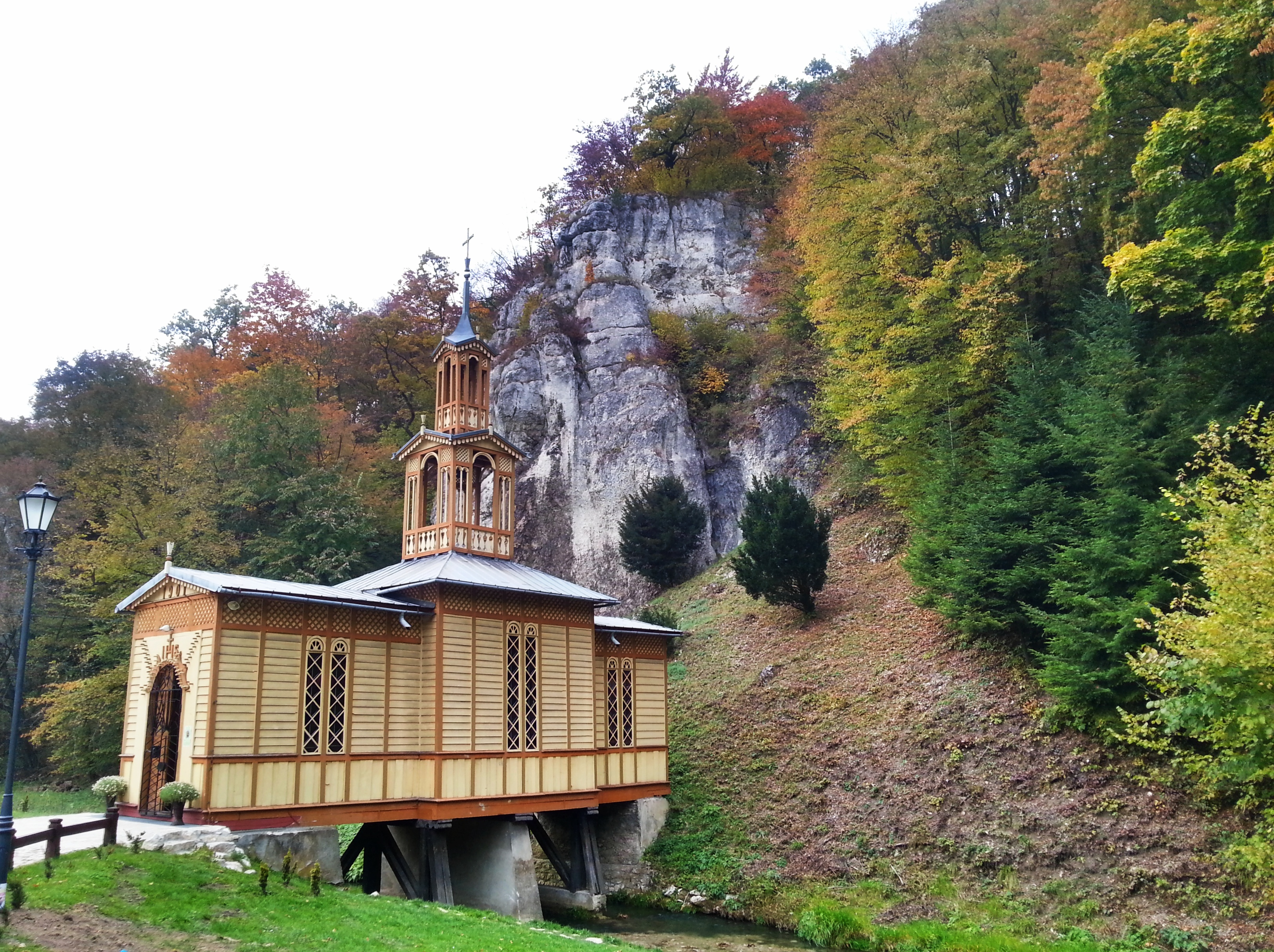
Chapel on the Water

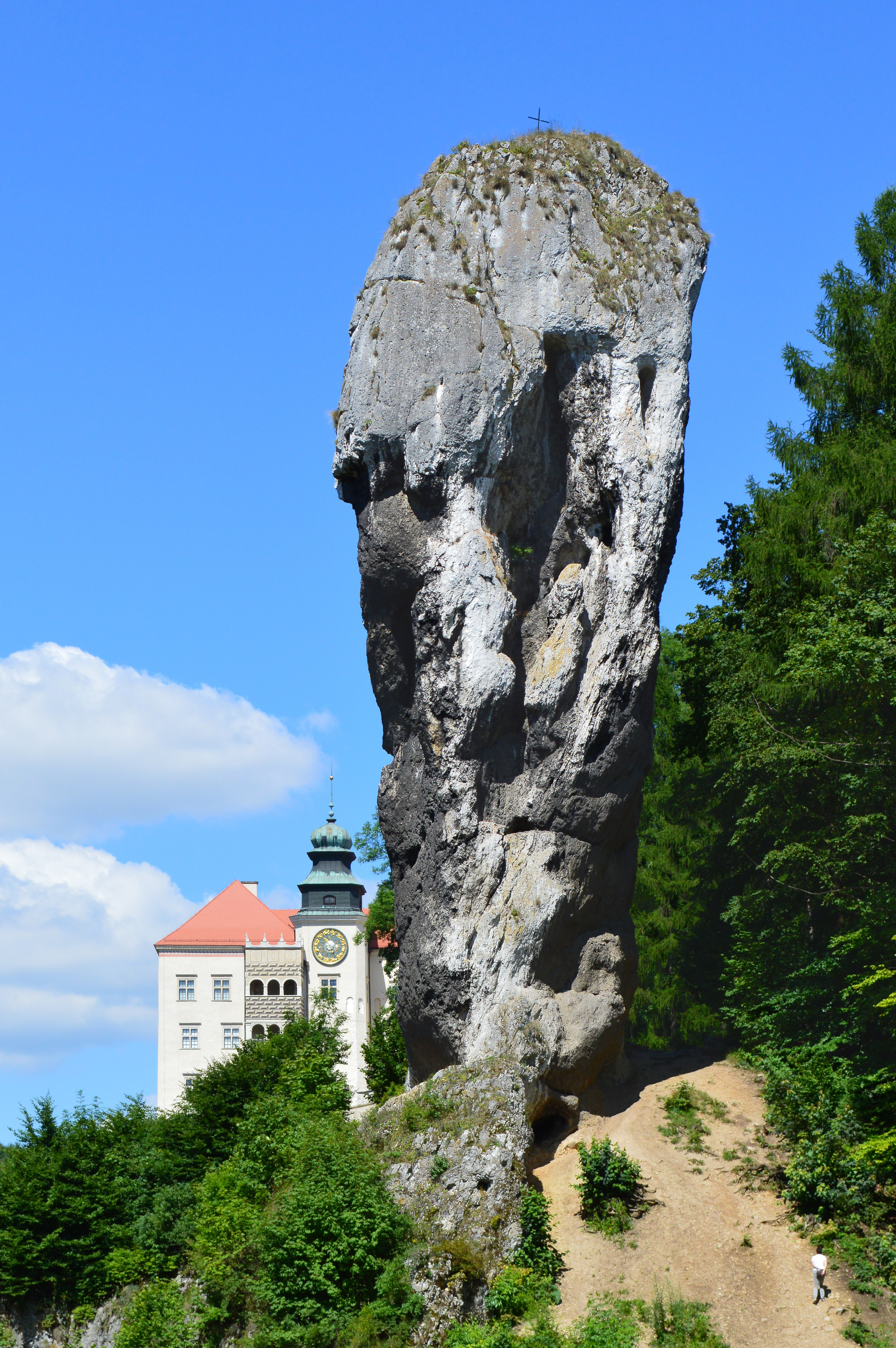
Hercules's Bludgeon

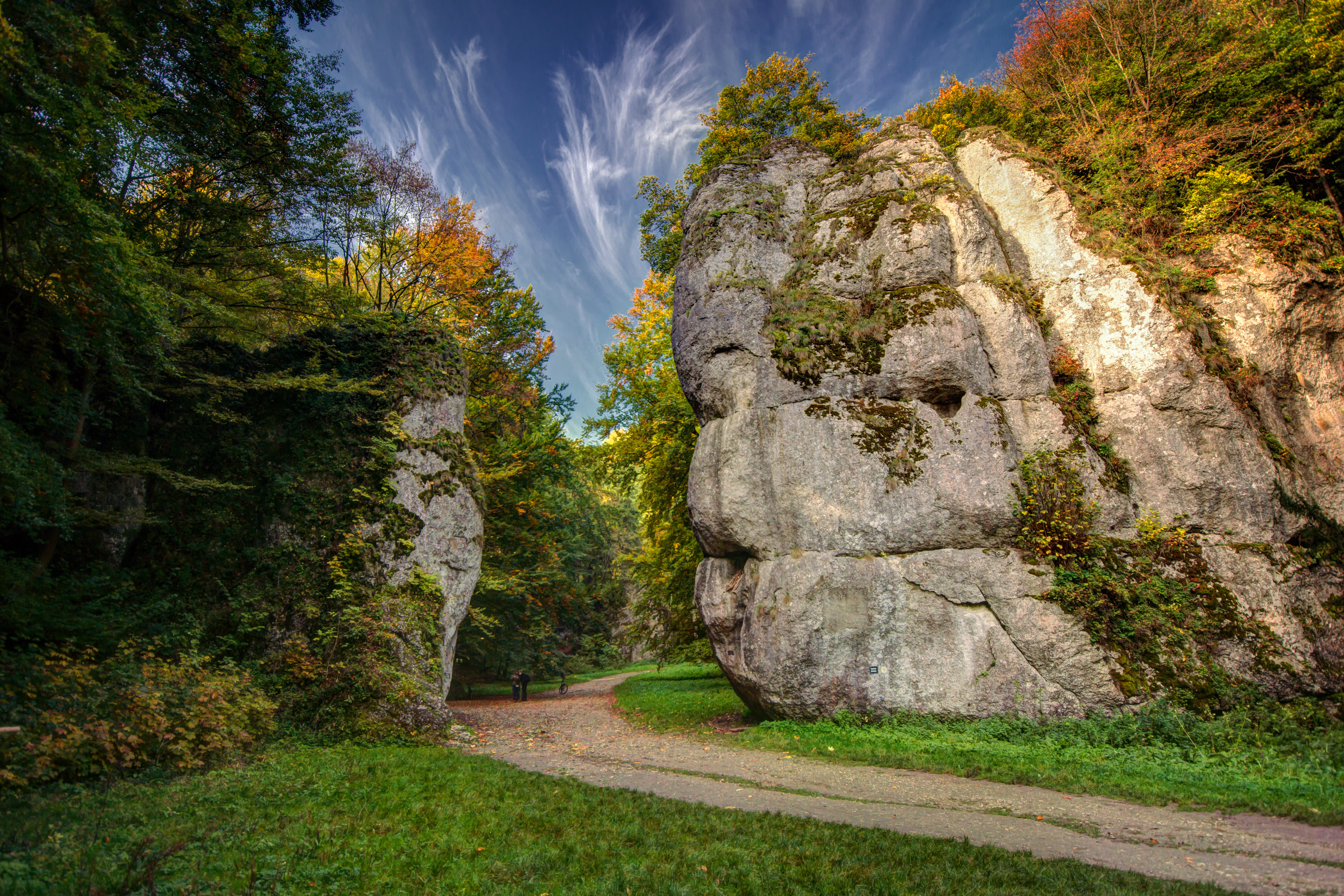
Kraków's Gate

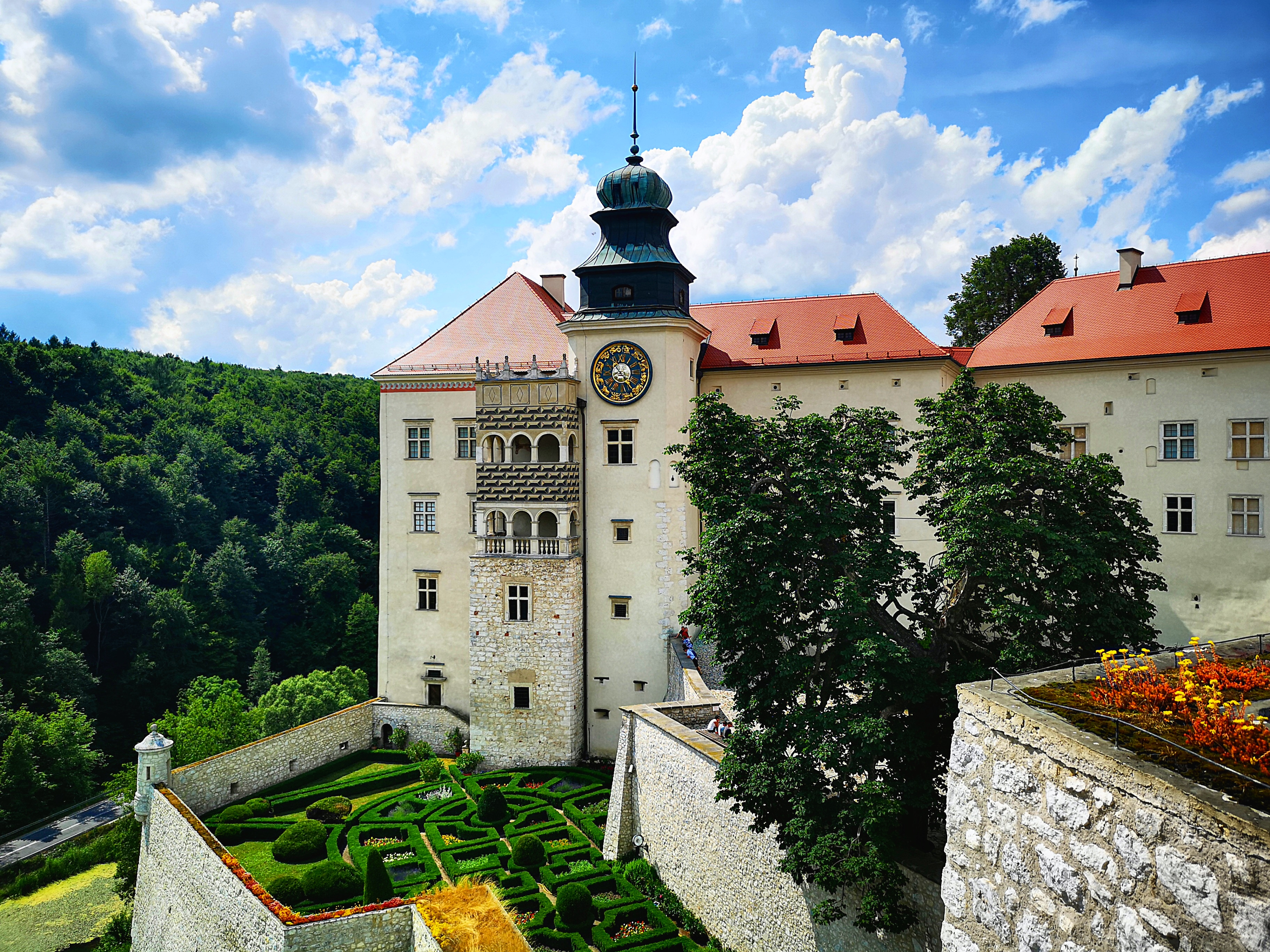
Pieskowa Skała Castle

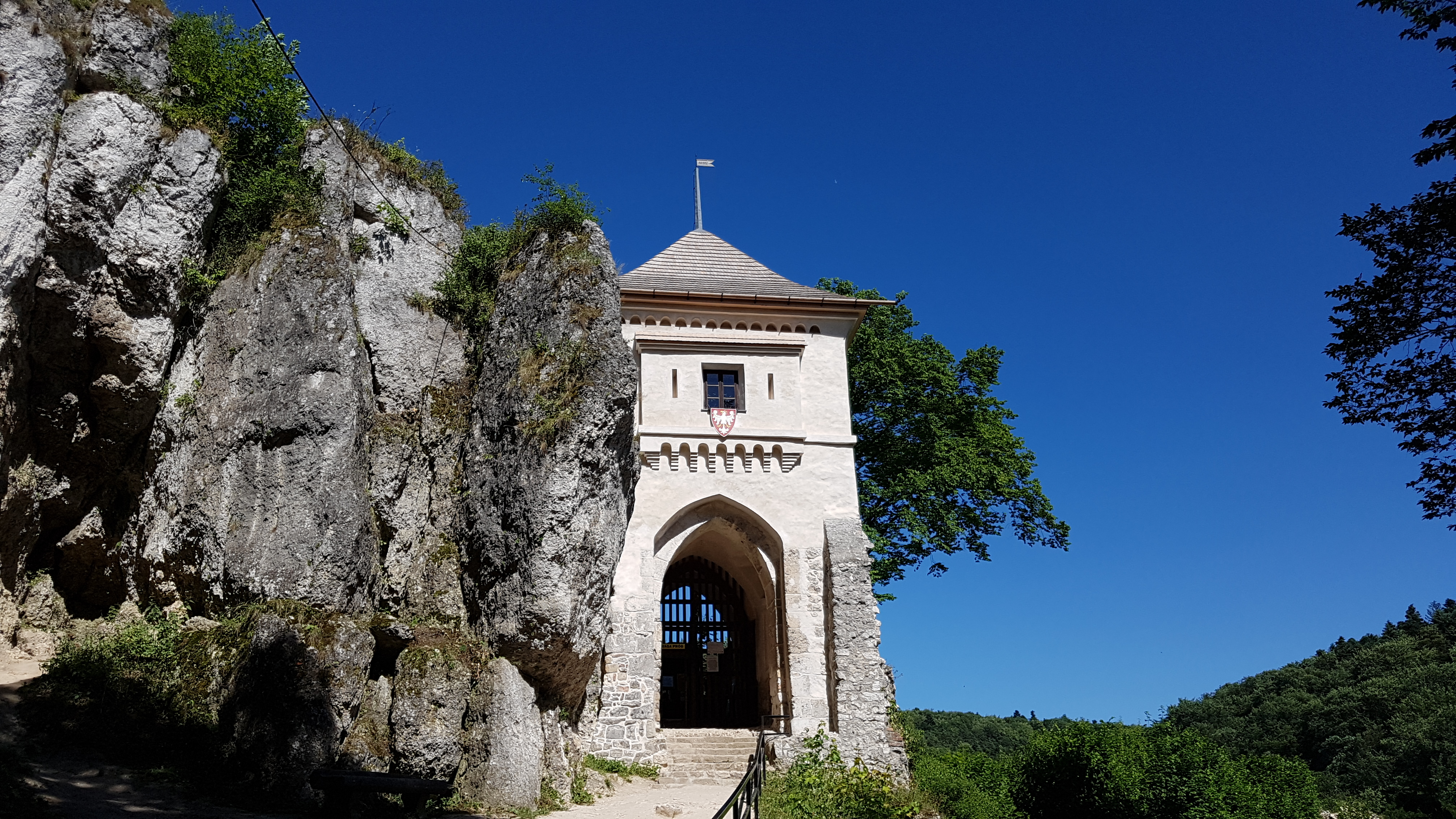
Ojców Castle ruins

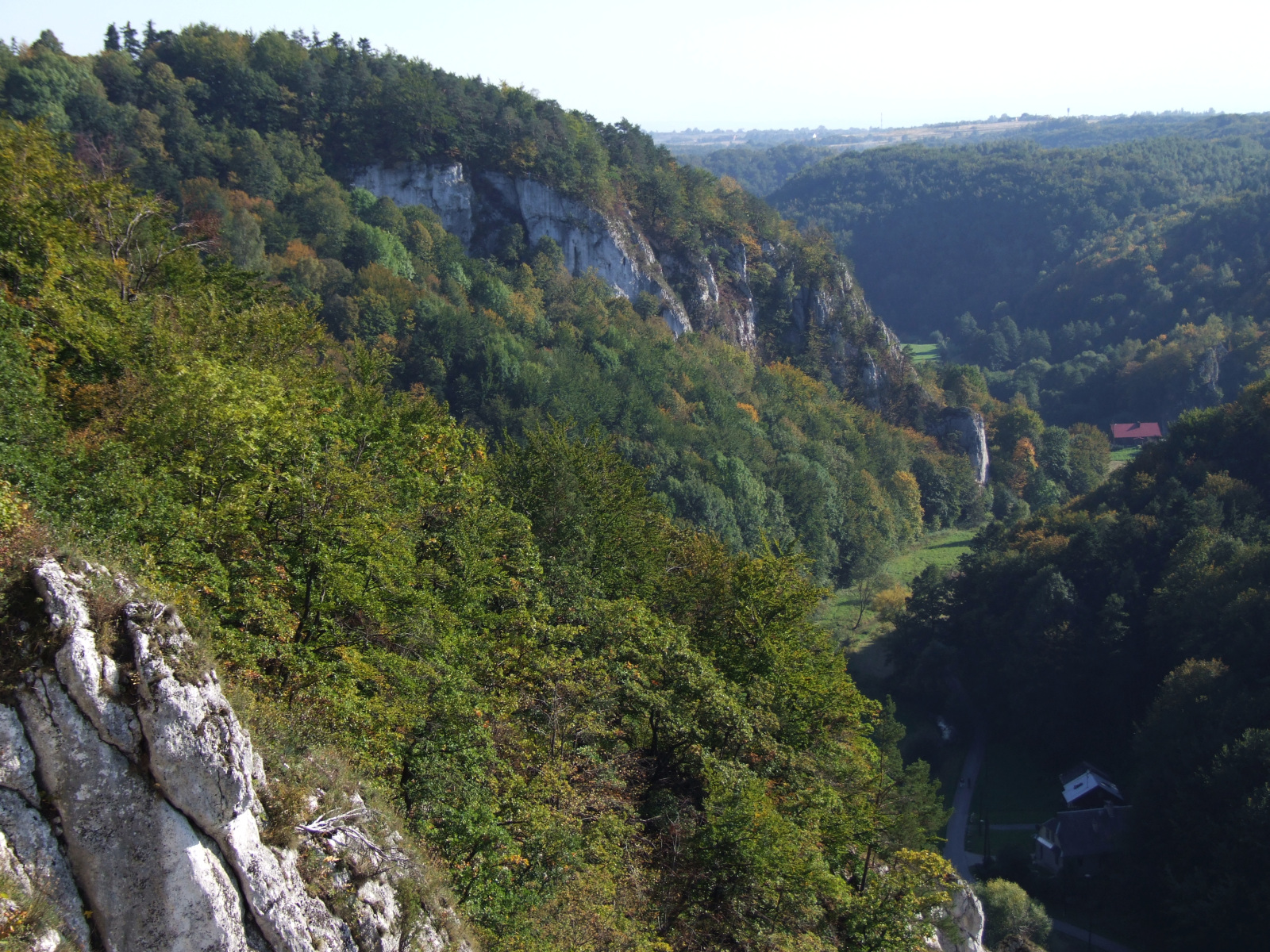
Prądnik Valley

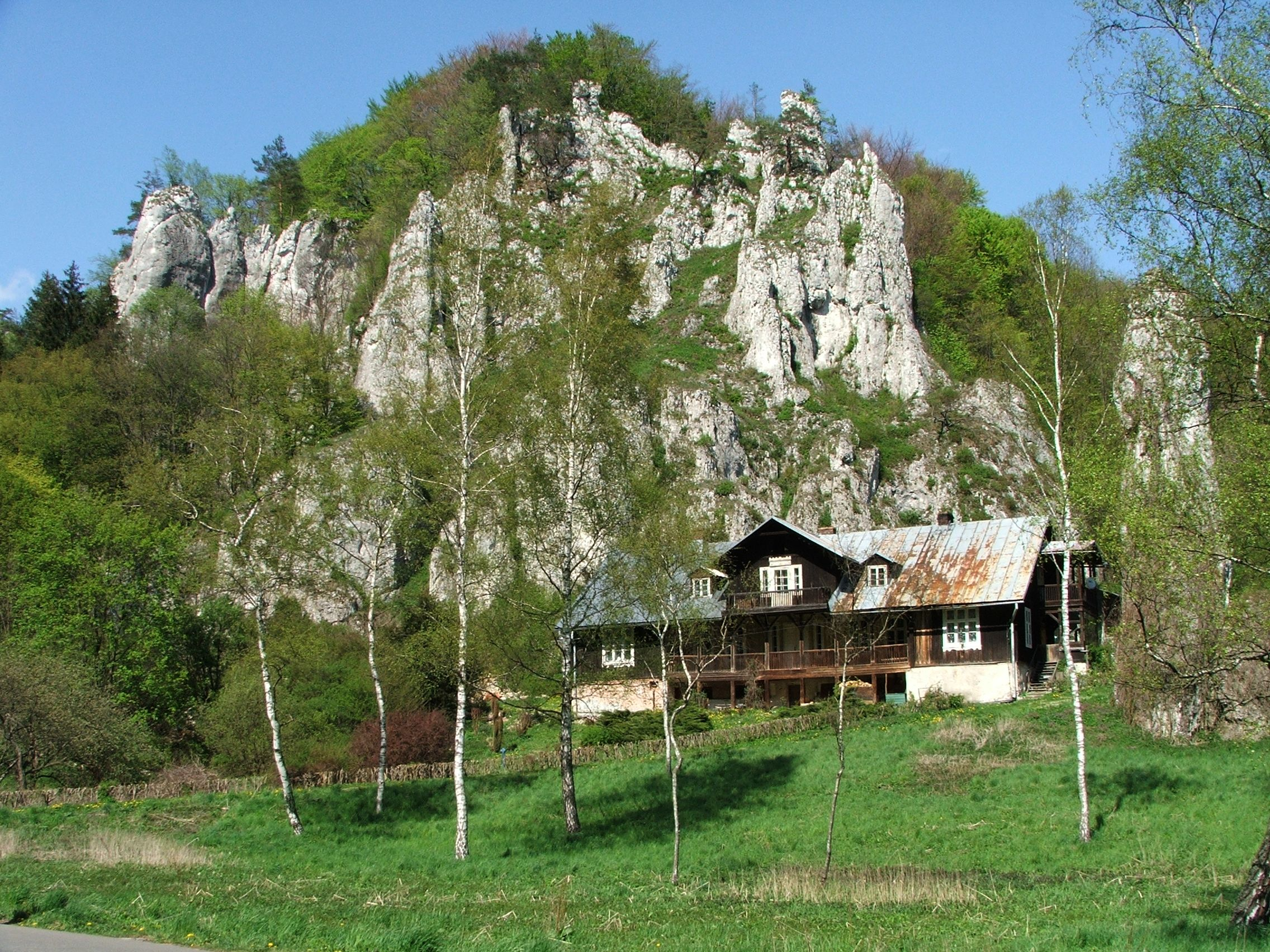
Under the Crown rock formation
