= Stara Chmielówka =

- Village
- Location within Poland
- Coordinates: 54°7′59″N 22°45′45″E
- Country: Poland
- Voivodeship: Podlaskie
- County: Suwałki
- Gmina: Bakałarzewo
- Population: 180

Stara Chmielówka [ˈstara xmjɛˈlufka] is a village in the administrative district of Gmina Bakałarzewo, within Suwałki County, Podlaskie Voivodeship, in north-eastern Poland.
