= Orłowo, Podlaskie Voivodeship =

Orłowo
- Village
- Location within Poland
- Coordinates: 54°5′N 22°46′E
- Country: Poland
- Voivodeship: Podlaskie
- County: Suwałki
- Gmina: Bakałarzewo

Orłowo [ɔrˈwɔvɔ] is a village in the administrative district of Gmina Bakałarzewo, within Suwałki County, Podlaskie Voivodeship, in north-eastern Poland.
