= Konopki, Suwałki County =

Konopki
- Village
- Location within Poland
- Coordinates: 54°3′N 22°39′E
- Country: Poland
- Voivodeship: Podlaskie
- County: Suwałki
- Gmina: Bakałarzewo
- Elevation: 18 m (59 ft)

Konopki [kɔˈnɔpki] is a village in the administrative district of Gmina Bakałarzewo, within Suwałki County, of Podlaskie Voivodeship, in north-eastern Poland.
