= Podrabalina =

- Village
- Location within Poland
- Coordinates: 54°2′57″N 22°43′27″E
- Country: Poland
- Voivodeship: Podlaskie
- County: Suwałki
- Gmina: Bakałarzewo

Podrabalina [pɔdrabaˈlina] is a village in the administrative district of Gmina Bakałarzewo, within Suwałki County, Podlaskie Voivodeship, in north-eastern Poland.
