= Aleksandrowo, Gmina Troszyn =

Aleksandrowo
- Village
- Location within Poland
- Coordinates: 53°3′8″N 21°54′3″E
- Country: Poland
- Voivodeship: Masovian
- County: Ostrołęka
- Gmina: Troszyn
- Time zone: UTC+1 (CET)
  - Summer (DST): UTC+2 (CEST)
- Vehicle registration: WOS

Aleksandrowo [alɛksanˈdrɔvɔ] is a village in the administrative district of Gmina Troszyn, within Ostrołęka County, Masovian Voivodeship, in north-eastern Poland.

As a result of the Soviet invasion of Poland in September 1939, the town was under Soviet occupation. Since June 1941 under German occupation. From 22 July 1941 to 1945, it was administratively included in the Landkreis Lomsch, Bezirk Bialystok III of the Reich.

Five Polish citizens were murdered by Nazi Germany in the village during World War II.
