= Słupie, Gmina Bakałarzewo =

Słupie
- Village
- Location within Poland
- Coordinates: 54°06′47″N 22°44′41″E
- Country: Poland
- Voivodeship: Podlaskie
- County: Suwałki
- Gmina: Bakałarzewo
- Time zone: UTC+1 (CET)
  - Summer (DST): UTC+2 (CEST)

Słupie [ˈswupjɛ] is a village in the administrative district of Gmina Bakałarzewo, within Suwałki County, Podlaskie Voivodeship, in north-eastern Poland.
