= Aleksandrowo, Suwałki County =

Aleksandrowo
- Village
- Location within Poland
- Coordinates: 54°05′25″N 22°46′02″E
- Country: Poland
- Voivodeship: Podlaskie
- County: Suwałki
- Gmina: Bakałarzewo

Aleksandrowo [alɛksanˈdrɔvɔ] is a village in the administrative district of Gmina Bakałarzewo, within Suwałki County, Podlaskie Voivodeship, in north-eastern Poland.
