= Jeziory, Greater Poland Voivodeship =

Jeziory
- Village
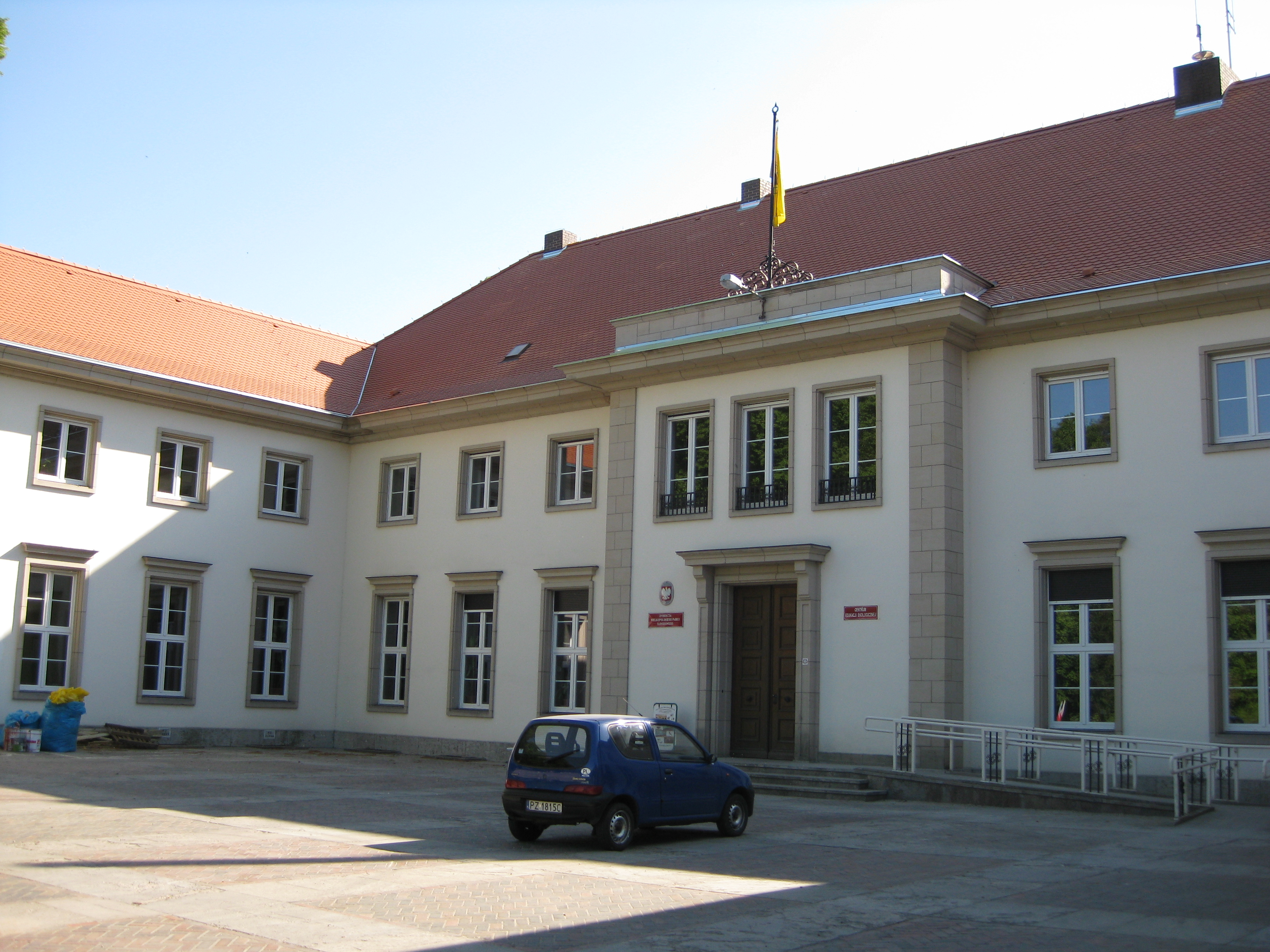
- Administrative office of the Wielkopolski National Park

- Location within Poland
- Coordinates: 52°16′9″N 16°47′56″E
- Country: Poland
- Voivodeship: Greater Poland
- County: Poznań
- Gmina: Mosina

Jeziory [jɛˈʑɔrɨ] is a village in the administrative district of Gmina Mosina, within Poznań County, Greater Poland Voivodeship, in west-central Poland. It lies within Wielkopolska National Park, and is the site of the Park's administrative offices.
