= Krzywe, Podlaskie Voivodeship =

Krzywe
- Village
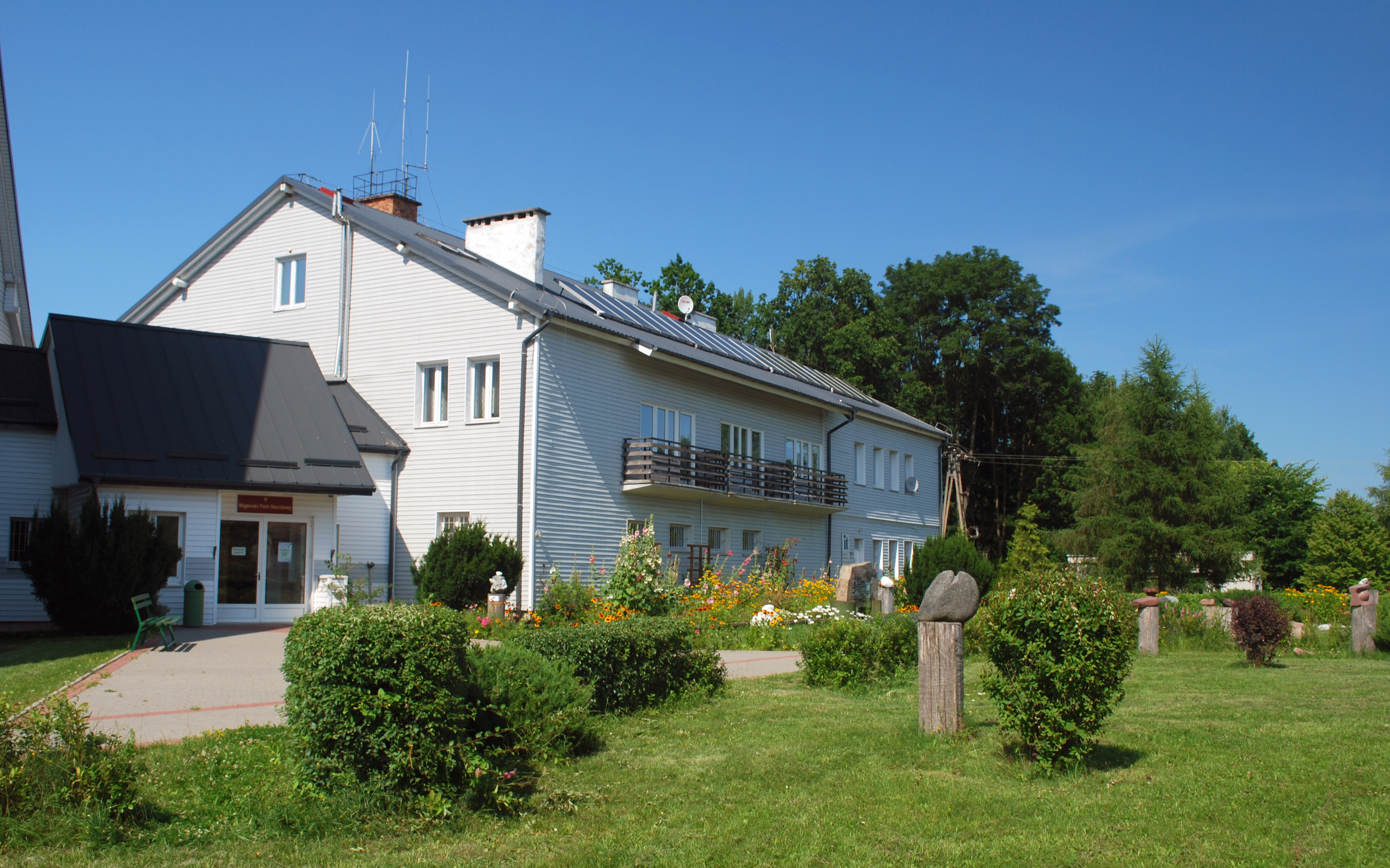
- Seat of the Wigry National Park in Krzywe

- Location within Poland
- Coordinates: 54°5′3″N 23°0′24″E
- Country: Poland
- Voivodeship: Podlaskie
- County: Suwałki
- Gmina: Suwałki
- Time zone: UTC+1 (CET)
  - Summer (DST): UTC+2 (CEST)
- Vehicle registration: BSU

Krzywe [ˈkʂɨvɛ] is a village in the administrative district of Gmina Suwałki, within Suwałki County, Podlaskie Voivodeship, in north-eastern Poland.

The seat of the Wigry National Park is located in Krzywe.

During the German occupation of Poland (World War II), in 1940, the Germans murdered Antoni Romuald Jałbrzykowski, a Polish parish priest from Bakałarzewo, in the forest near the village as part of the Intelligenzaktion. According to some sources, the Germans gouged out his eyes and torn his tongue out before the execution.
