= Uppsala model =

Theory of internationalization of enterprises

The Uppsala internationalization model (also known as the Uppsala model or U-Model) is one of the stage theories of internationalization of enterprises, which assumes that a company undergoes a sequential progression through various stages in the process of its international expansion. This theory, developed in the 1970s, was created by Swedish economists Jan Johanson and Finn Wiedersheim-Paul and was later expanded by Jan Johanson and Jan-Erik Vahlne. The name of the model derives from the Swedish city of Uppsala, as all three authors were affiliated with Uppsala University.

== Place of the Uppsala model in internationalization theories ==
The Uppsala model is a key framework within the stage theories of enterprise internationalization. It is designed to explain how companies expand their operations internationally, progressing through various stages. The model addresses research questions regarding the internationalization process, including how companies internationalize their operations, the decision-making process behind internationalization, and the motivations and factors driving a company's decision to expand. It also explores the strategies and instruments companies select for internationalization, the typical characteristics of companies undertaking international expansion, and how they choose international locations for their ventures.

As a primary stage model, the Uppsala model suggests that companies progressively increase their international involvement over time. Initially, while internationalizing their operations, companies focus on their domestic markets before expanding into foreign markets through sales and production activities.

=== Historical outline ===
Initially, all issues related to internationalization were analyzed within macroeconomic or mesoeconomic frameworks in the context of the subdiscipline of international economic relations. During this time, theories of international trade and foreign direct investment were developed. However, the theory of enterprise internationalization (at the microeconomic level and within management sciences) emerged in the 1950s (e.g., Dunning's eclectic paradigm). According to Marian Gorynia, the Uppsala model became one of the most widely recognized concepts in the field of firm internationalization.

This model was first introduced in 1975 by Jan Johanson and Finn Wiedersheim-Paul. It was later modified in 1977 by Jan Johanson and Jan-Erik Vahlne, and further developed in 1978 by Finn Wiedersheim-Paul, Hans C. Olson, and Lawrence S. Welch.

== Assumptions and variables of the Uppsala model ==
The Uppsala model is grounded in two key economic theories: behavioral theory and resource-based theory. The model relies on the concept of empirical knowledge, which posits that a company's behavior during the internationalization process is largely shaped by the practical knowledge it possesses.

The model is structured around four factors: two fixed and two variable. The fixed factors are market knowledge (V1) and market commitment (V2), while the variable factors are decision-making commitment (V3) and ongoing activities (V4). As a company gains more knowledge about foreign markets (V1), its commitment of resources to those markets (V2) tends to increase. These static factors influence the dynamic factors, as the knowledge acquired informs and triggers decision-making processes regarding further international expansion. In turn, these decisions affect the intensity of internationalization, or the company's ongoing activities. The dynamic factors, in turn, create feedback loops that influence the static factors, giving the model a cyclical and dynamic nature.

=== Mechanisms of the Uppsala model ===
The Uppsala model uses the concept of psychological distance to explain the patterns of a company's involvement in international activities. Psychological distance refers to the perceived differences between the company's home market and foreign markets, including factors such as language, culture, level of education, economic development, political system, and legal system. Initially, companies tend to enter markets that are closer to their home market in terms of psychological distance, as these markets are perceived to be more familiar and less risky.

The model emphasizes the organization’s learning mechanism, rooted in organizational theory and management. As a company gains knowledge through experience, its commitment to international activities increases. The model identifies the lack of knowledge as the primary barrier to internationalization.

== Stages of the Uppsala model ==
Depending on the authorship, stage models distinguish between from 3 to 8 sequential stages. The Uppsala model identifies four stages of a company's internationalization, namely:

- irregular export;
- export through intermediaries;
- establishment of trading subsidiaries;
- initiation of production abroad.

A further development of the concept introduced a zero stage of internationalization, known as domestic internationalization, which consists of three phases:

- lack of willingness to begin exporting;
- slight willingness to begin exporting;
- significant willingness to begin exporting.

== Uppsala model and POM model ==
In the literature, the Uppsala model is often compared to the POM (Product – Operation mode – Market) model due to the significant similarities in explaining the process of enterprise internationalization.

In both models, prior experience in the domestic market is required before expanding into foreign markets, and the expansion occurs gradually according to the criterion of geographical proximity. An increase in the level of empirical knowledge is a necessary determinant for further expansion. However, the Uppsala model states that a company's level of commitment may decrease or even fade if the performance in the foreign venture is not satisfactory.

The Uppsala model suggests that foreign sales should begin with irregular export activities, while the POM model posits that regular export is the first step. The POM model assumes that the first extension of a company's operations into foreign markets is more structured and involves regular export from the outset.

== Conclusions from the Uppsala model ==
The Uppsala model of internationalization of enterprises provides the following conclusions that contribute to a holistic understanding of corporate internationalization:

- Enterprises usually begin their internationalization process with export activities, and it is only after gaining experience in these activities that they pursue actions requiring greater commitment.
- Companies typically expand into markets of neighboring countries first.
- Both cultural distance and physical distance play crucial roles in the internationalization process.
- Market knowledge, experience, and intuition are determinants for expanding into new markets.
- In foreign operations, enterprises utilize both general knowledge (related to internationalization) and specific knowledge (related to a particular market).
- The decision to enter a foreign market is influenced by the stage of development the company has reached.
- Expansion is preceded by success in the domestic market and is a consequence of a series of decisions made within the company.

== Critique of the Uppsala model ==
The Uppsala model, like any stage theory model, faces criticism. It is accused of two inappropriate axiological assumptions. Not every enterprise is initially oriented towards the domestic market. In contemporary business environments, many companies, known as "born globals", operate on international markets from the beginning of their existence.The model also suggests that not every enterprise goes through all stages of the process from the first to the last. While the Uppsala model – unlike other stage theories – allows for the omission of certain stages, it still implies a stepwise process that does not apply universally to all firms. Further, it has faced critique for not being relevant to service firms.

== Bibliography ==
- Daszkiewicz, Nelly (2004). Internacjonalizacja małych i średnich przedsiębiorstw we współczesnej gospodarce [Internationalization of Small and Medium Enterprises in the Modern Economy] (in Polish). Gdańsk: Scientific Publishing Group. ISBN 83-921075-0-0.
