= Malewo, Greater Poland Voivodeship =

Malewo
- Village
- Location within Poland
- Coordinates: 51°55′41″N 16°59′52″E
- Country: Poland
- Voivodeship: Greater Poland
- County: Gostyń
- Gmina: Gostyń
- Population: 50

Malewo [maˈlɛvɔ] is a village in the administrative district of Gmina Gostyń, within Gostyń County, Greater Poland Voivodeship, in west-central Poland.
