= Bogdanki =

Bogdanki may refer to the following places:

- Bogdanki, Greater Poland Voivodeship (west-central Poland)
- Bogdanki, Kuyavian-Pomeranian Voivodeship (north-central Poland)
- Bogdanki, Podlaskie Voivodeship (north-east Poland)
