= Gaj, Gostyń County =

Gaj
- Village
- Location within Poland
- Coordinates: 51°57′21″N 17°1′54″E
- Country: Poland
- Voivodeship: Greater Poland
- County: Gostyń
- Gmina: Gostyń

Gaj [ɡai̯] is a village in the administrative district of Gmina Gostyń, within Gostyń County, Greater Poland Voivodeship, in west-central Poland.
