= Kunowo, Gostyń County =

Kunowo
- Village
- Location within Poland
- Coordinates: 51°56′6″N 17°1′0″E
- Country: Poland
- Voivodeship: Greater Poland
- County: Gostyń
- Gmina: Gostyń
- Population: 550

Kunowo [kuˈnɔvɔ] is a village in the administrative district of Gmina Gostyń, within Gostyń County, Greater Poland Voivodeship, in west-central Poland.
