= Miranowo =

- Settlement
- Location within Poland
- Coordinates: 51°58′29″N 17°0′20″E
- Country: Poland
- Voivodeship: Greater Poland
- County: Gostyń
- Gmina: Gostyń

Miranowo [miraˈnɔvɔ] is a settlement in the administrative district of Gmina Gostyń, within Gostyń County, Greater Poland Voivodeship, in west-central Poland.
