= Gmina Poniec =

Gmina Poniec Poniec Commune
- Gmina
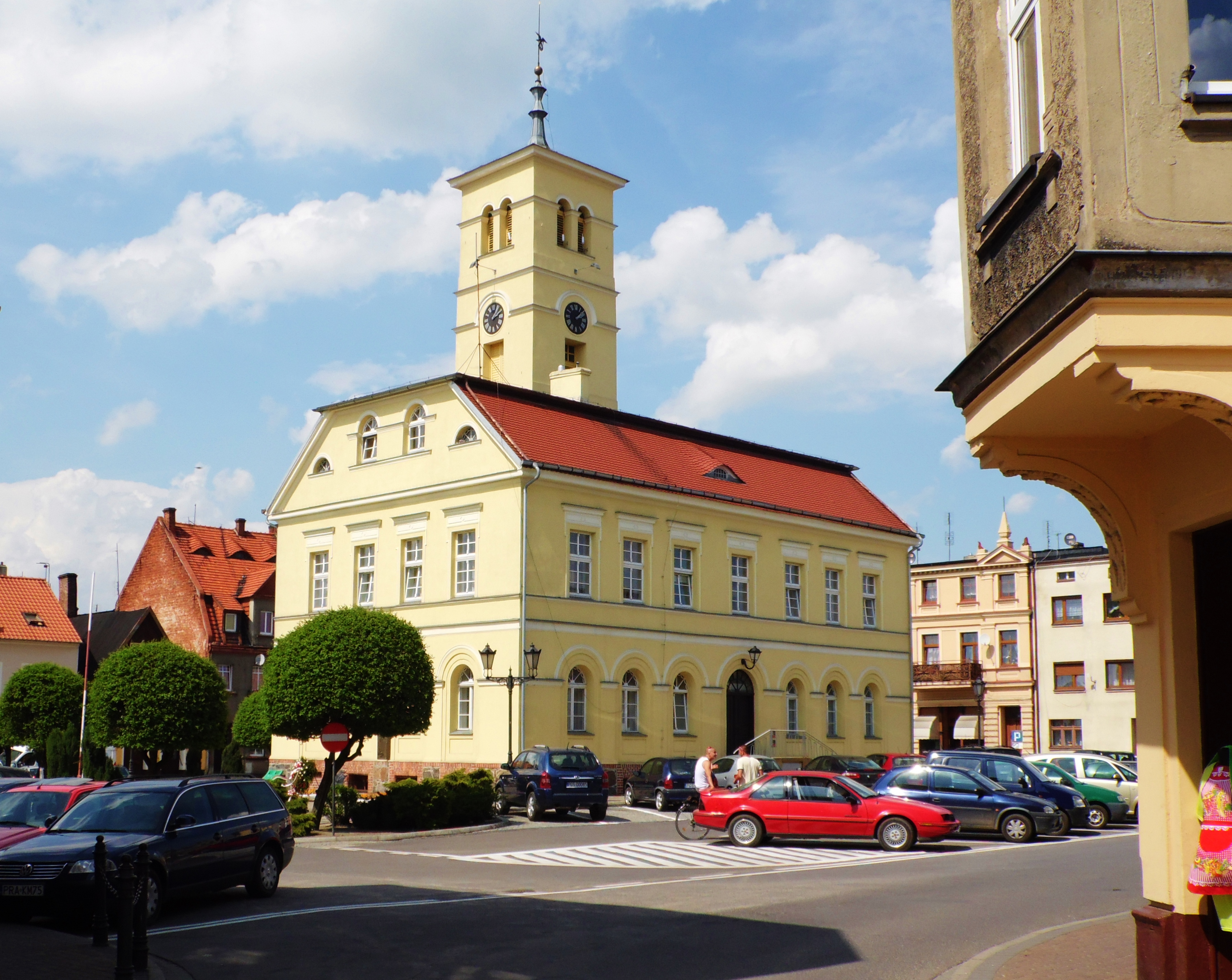
- Town Hall in Poniec, seat of the gmina office

- Coat of arms
- Interactive map of Gmina Poniec
- Coordinates (Poniec): 51°45′30″N 16°49′0″E
- Country: Poland
- Voivodeship: Greater Poland
- County: Gostyń
- Seat: Poniec

Area
  - Total: 132.32 km^{2} (51.09 sq mi)

Population (2006)
  - Total: 7,866
  - Density: 59.45/km^{2} (154.0/sq mi)
  - Urban: 2,875
  - Rural: 4,991
- Time zone: UTC+1 (CET)
  - Summer (DST): UTC+2 (CEST)
- Vehicle registration: PGS
- Website: http://www.poniec.pl/

Gmina Poniec is an urban-rural gmina (administrative district) in Gostyń County, Greater Poland Voivodeship, in west-central Poland. Its seat is the town of Poniec, which lies approximately 20 kilometres (12 mi) south-west of Gostyń and 72 km (45 mi) south of the regional capital Poznań.

The gmina covers an area of 132.32 square kilometres (51.1 sq mi), and as of 2006 its total population is 7,866 (out of which the population of Poniec amounts to 2,875, and the population of the rural part of the gmina is 4,991).

== Villages ==
Apart from the town of Poniec, Gmina Poniec contains the villages and settlements of Bączylas, Bogdanki, Czarkowo, Drzewce, Dzięczyna, Dzięczynka, Franciszkowo, Grodzisko, Janiszewo, Kopanie, Łęka Mała, Maciejewo, Miechcin, Rokosowo, Sarbinowo, Śmiłowo, Szurkowo, Teodozewo, Waszkowo, Włostki, Wydawy, Zawada and Żytowiecko.

== Neighbouring gminas ==
Gmina Poniec is bordered by the gminas of Bojanowo, Gostyń, Krobia, Krzemieniewo, Miejska Górka and Rydzyna.
