= Gębice, Gostyń County =

Gębice
- Village
- Location within Poland
- Coordinates: 51°45′N 17°5′E
- Country: Poland
- Voivodeship: Greater Poland
- County: Gostyń
- Gmina: Pępowo

Gębice [ɡɛmˈbit͡sɛ] is a village in the administrative district of Gmina Pępowo, within Gostyń County, Greater Poland Voivodeship, in west-central Poland.
