= Wilkonice, Greater Poland Voivodeship =

Wilkonice
- Village
- Location within Poland
- Coordinates: 51°43′N 17°6′E
- Country: Poland
- Voivodeship: Greater Poland
- County: Gostyń
- Gmina: Pępowo

Wilkonice [vilkɔˈnit͡sɛ] is a village in the administrative district of Gmina Pępowo, within Gostyń County, Greater Poland Voivodeship, in west-central Poland.
