= Ostrowo, Gostyń County =

Ostrowo
- Village
- Location within Poland
- Coordinates: 51°55′6″N 17°2′7″E
- Country: Poland
- Voivodeship: Greater Poland
- County: Gostyń
- Gmina: Gostyń
- Population: 220

Ostrowo [ɔsˈtrɔvɔ] is a village in the administrative district of Gmina Gostyń, within Gostyń County, Greater Poland Voivodeship, in west-central Poland.
