= Stankowo, Greater Poland Voivodeship =

Stankowo
- Village
- Location within Poland
- Coordinates: 51°55′6″N 16°55′1″E
- Country: Poland
- Voivodeship: Greater Poland
- County: Gostyń
- Gmina: Gostyń
- Population: 280

Stankowo [stanˈkɔvɔ] is a village in the administrative district of Gmina Gostyń, within Gostyń County, Greater Poland Voivodeship, in west-central Poland.
