= Brzezie, Gostyń County =

Brzezie
- Village
- Location within Poland
- Coordinates: 51°52′21″N 16°59′12″E
- Country: Poland
- Voivodeship: Greater Poland
- County: Gostyń
- Gmina: Gostyń
- Population: 610

Brzezie [ˈbʐɛʑɛ] is a village in the administrative district of Gmina Gostyń, within Gostyń County, Greater Poland Voivodeship, in west-central Poland.
