= Otówko =

- Settlement
- Location within Poland
- Coordinates: 51°52′44″N 16°57′44″E
- Country: Poland
- Voivodeship: Greater Poland
- County: Gostyń
- Gmina: Gostyń

Otówko [ɔˈtufkɔ] is a settlement in the administrative district of Gmina Gostyń, within Gostyń County, Greater Poland Voivodeship, in west-central Poland.
