= Siedlec, Gostyń County =

Siedlec
- Village
- Location within Poland
- Coordinates: 51°47′43″N 17°07′25″E
- Country: Poland
- Voivodeship: Greater Poland
- County: Gostyń
- Gmina: Pępowo
- Population: 580

Siedlec [ˈɕɛdlɛt͡s] is a village in the administrative district of Gmina Pępowo, within Gostyń County, Greater Poland Voivodeship, in west-central Poland.
