= Krajewice =

- Village
- Location within Poland
- Coordinates: 51°50′12″N 17°1′49″E
- Country: Poland
- Voivodeship: Greater Poland
- County: Gostyń
- Gmina: Gostyń
- Population: 400

Krajewice [krajɛˈvit͡sɛ] is a village in the administrative district of Gmina Gostyń, within Gostyń County, Greater Poland Voivodeship, in west-central Poland.

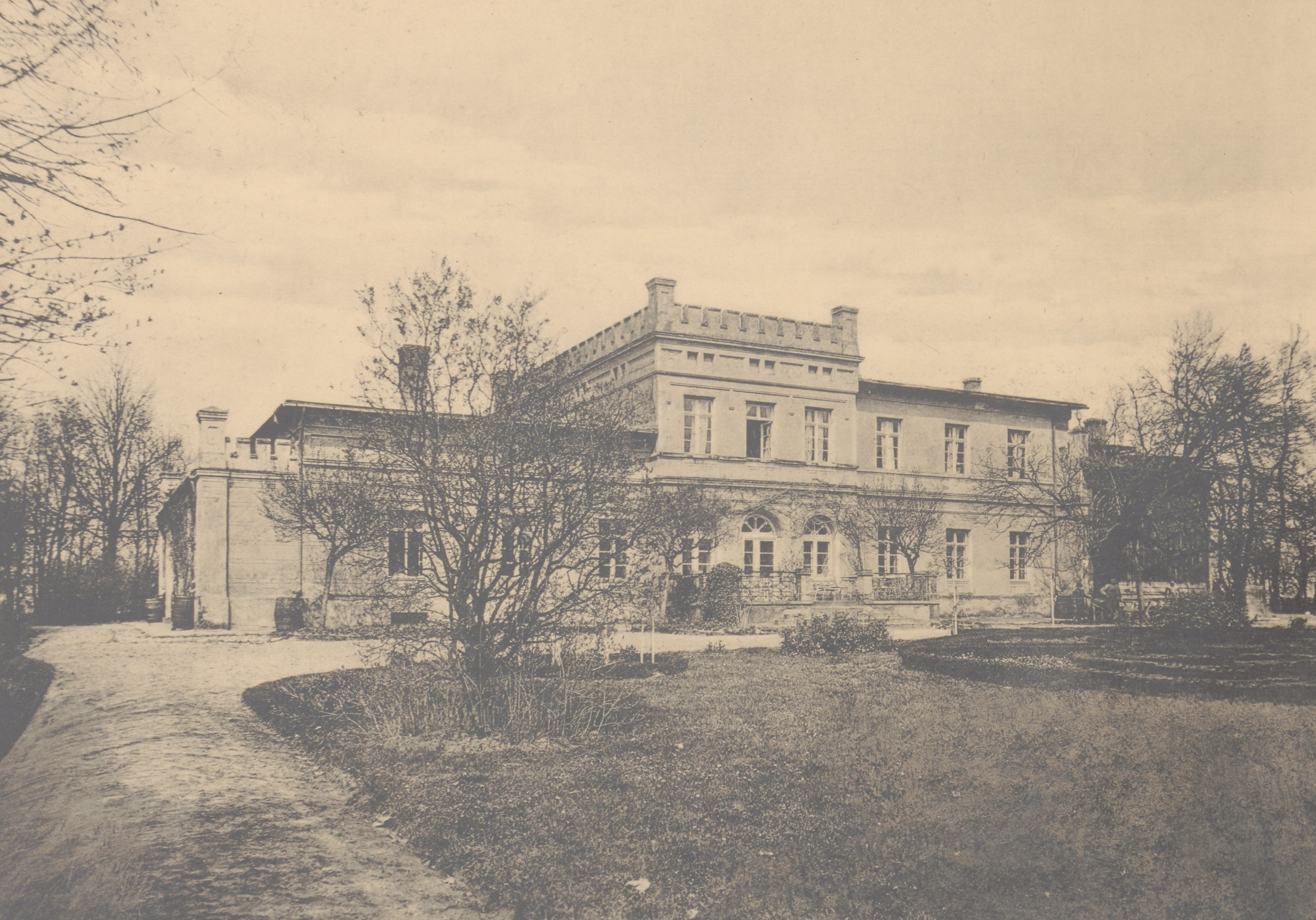
Manor house in Krajewice, 1912
