= Gmina Pępowo =

Gmina Pępowo Pępowo Commune
- Gmina
- Flag Coat of arms

- Location within Poland Location within Greater Poland Voivodeship
- Coordinates (Pępowo): 51°45′43″N 17°7′9″E
- Country: Poland
- Voivodeship: Greater Poland
- County: Gostyń
- Seat: Pępowo

Area
  - Total: 86.71 km^{2} (33.48 sq mi)

Population (2006)
  - Total: 5,991
  - Density: 69.09/km^{2} (178.9/sq mi)
- Website: http://www.pepowo.pl/

Gmina Pępowo is a rural gmina (administrative district) in Gostyń County, Greater Poland Voivodeship, in west-central Poland. Its seat is the village of Pępowo, which lies approximately 15 kilometres (9 mi) south-east of Gostyń and 73 km (45 mi) south of the regional capital Poznań.

The gmina covers an area of 86.71 square kilometres (33.5 sq mi), and as of 2006 its total population is 5,991.

== Villages ==
Gmina Pępowo contains the villages and settlements of Babkowice, Czeluścin, Czeluścinek, Gębice, Kościuszkowo, Krzekotowice, Krzyżanki, Ludwinowo, Magdalenki, Pasierby, Pępowo, Siedlec, Skoraszewice and Wilkonice.

== Neighbouring gminas ==
Gmina Pępowo is bordered by the gminas of Jutrosin, Kobylin, Krobia, Miejska Górka, Piaski and Pogorzela.
