= Jan Nepomucen Umiński =

Polish military officer

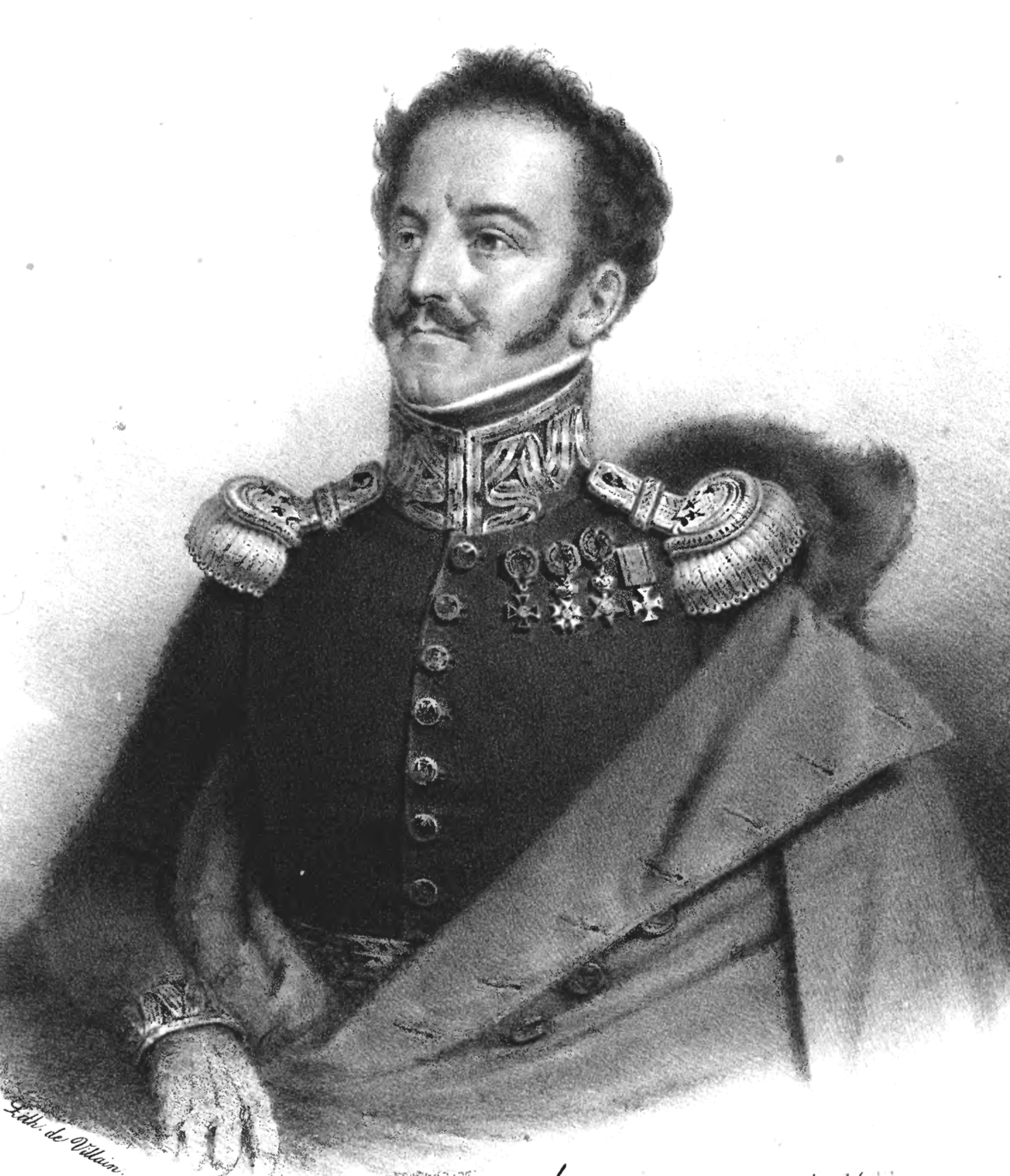
- Born: 22 January 1778; Czeluścin, Poland
- Died: 15 June 1851; Wiesbaden, Germany
- Occupation: Military officer

Jan Nepomucen Umiński of Cholewa (1778–1851) was a Polish military officer and a brigadier general of the Army of the Duchy of Warsaw. A veteran of the Kościuszko Uprising, Napoleonic Wars and the November Uprising, he died in exile in Wiesbaden.

== Biography ==
=== Napoleonic period ===
Jan Nepomucen Umiński was born to a Polish gentry family in Czeluścin in Greater Poland on 22 January 1778. He joined the Army of the Republic of Poland early in his life and took part in the failed Kościuszko Uprising of 1794 as an adjutant to General Antoni Madaliński. Following the Polish defeat, he escaped Russian-held Poland and briefly settled in Dresden, where he served as an emissary of the Society of Polish Republicans and General Jan Henryk Dąbrowski.

When Napoleonic Wars started he joined the French and took part in the fights of the War of the Fourth Coalition, notably the 1807 siege of Danzig and the battle of Tczew. Taken captive by the Prussians, he was set free after the armistice and joined the French cavalry, where he quickly rose to the rank of Major. He was soon transferred to the Army of the Duchy of Warsaw, where he served in Poznań as the commanding officer of a cavalry honour guard squadron. He took part in the brief Polish–Austrian War; as part of the forces under General Jan Henryk Dąbrowski, Umiński took part in, among other battles, the taking of the town of Sandomierz.

In 1812 Umiński took part in French invasion of Russia, where he fought at Smolensk and the Battle of Borodino. His unit of hussars was the first to enter the city of Moscow. Following Borodino, in the Battle of Mozhaysk, he was promoted to the post of a brigade commanding officer. After the French retreat and the subsequent Russian capture of Poland, Umiński remained loyal to Napoleon and remained in Prince Józef Poniatowski's corps, with which he took part in the disastrous Battle of Nations. Wounded, he was taken prisoner of war but was released by the coalition forces in 1815.

=== Imprisonment, escape and the November Uprising ===
He returned to the newly established Kingdom of Poland and joined its armed forces. On 20 January 1815 he became the commanding officer of the 1st Mounted Rifles Regiment. However, already in December of that year he retired, and settled in his family estate of Smolice and Czeluścin in Prussian-held Greater Poland. A founder of a secret patriotic Scythemen Association, soon he joined Walerian Łukasiński's Patriotic Society. Under close observation by Prussian secret police, Umiński was considered an "incorrigible traitor of the state" and "zealous and criminal chauvinist due to his earlier involvements in Polish patriotic uprisings. However, his activities remained unknown to the Prussians for some time.

His situation became much more complicated after the Russians had arrested Walerian Łukasiński and his closest associates. Denounced to Prussian authorities by Łukasiński and Ignacy Prądzyński, he was finally arrested in 1826, together with Count Maciej Mielżyński. Despite protests by the youth of Poznań and other towns of the Grand Duchy of Posen, Umiński was charged with high treason and conspiracy, and sentenced to 6 years in a prison in Glogau. His village of Czeluścin was confiscated by Prussian authorities and sold to a new owner.

When the November Uprising broke out, Umiński's situation became more complicated. Already in mail contact with various factions throughout Europe, he was put under closer surveillance by the Prussian authorities. In front of his cell two guards were posted at all times, and an officer was stationed in his cell. However, as the discipline within the fortress was lacking, on 17 February 1831 Umiński organised in his cell a party for numerous officers stationed in the fortress. When at 20:00 the gates of the fortress were closed, it turned out that Umiński had escaped, leaving a group of drunk German officers behind. Eduard Heinrich von Flottwell ordered a complete blockade of all major roads leading towards Poland and dispatched hundreds of patrols in search of the fugitive, but the pursuit proved fruitless. Umiński had a relay of horses and assistants organised for him. Through Siedlnica, Książęcy Las (where Prince Antoni Sułkowski provided him with money), Rawicz, Chwałkowo, Konary, Grąbkowo and Rusko reached the Polish border. In the afternoon of 18 February Umiński arrived to Kalisz. Despite a lengthy investigation, the Prussian authorities never learned of the true extent of the conspiracy that made Umiński's escape possible.

On 21 February 1831 Umiński rejoined the Polish Army. Initially in the rank of an ordinary soldier, Umiński took part in the First Battle of Wawer and the bloody Battle of Olszynka Grochowska. Soon he was discovered by his former colleague, General Henryk Dembiński, who promoted him to a Colonel, then a Division General, and gave him command over the I Cavalry Corps. His Corps took part in the battles of Jędrzejów and the Battle of Ostrołęka, one of the bloodiest battles of the uprising, plagued by indecisiveness and bad command decisions on the side of the Polish Commander-in-Chief General Jan Zygmunt Skrzynecki. Critical of his superiors, Umiński nevertheless remained in the army until the very end of the uprising, taking part in the lengthy battle of Warsaw. Following the Polish defeat, he led the remaining Polish forces to Modlin and Płock, where on 23 September 1831 he was nominated to the post of the Polish Commander-in-Chief. Opposed by many generals, he held it for only a single day and ceded his duties to General Maciej Rybiński.

After the fall of uprising, Umiński went into exile in Paris. A close associate to Prince Adam Jerzy Czartoryski, he was one of the founders of the Literary Society of Paris, one of the most important Polish cultural and scientific associations of the 19th century. He then moved to Wiesbaden in Germany, where he died on 15 June 1851. He is a patron of streets and schools in numerous towns, as well as the 5th Reconnaissance Battalion of the Polish Army.
