= Klony =

Klony may refer to the following places:

- Klony, Gostyń County in Greater Poland Voivodeship (west-central Poland)
- Klony, Poznań County in Greater Poland Voivodeship (west-central Poland)
- Klony, Warmian-Masurian Voivodeship (north Poland)
