= Czeluścinek =

- Village
- Location within Poland
- Coordinates: 51°44′18″N 17°08′50″E
- Country: Poland
- Voivodeship: Greater Poland
- County: Gostyń
- Gmina: Pępowo

Czeluścinek [t͡ʂɛluɕˈt͡ɕinɛk] is a village in the administrative district of Gmina Pępowo, within Gostyń County, Greater Poland Voivodeship, in west-central Poland.
