= Poraj, Greater Poland Voivodeship =

Poraj
- Settlement
- Location within Poland
- Coordinates: 51°50′52″N 17°1′8″E
- Country: Poland
- Voivodeship: Greater Poland
- County: Gostyń
- Gmina: Gostyń

Poraj [ˈpɔrai̯] is a settlement in the administrative district of Gmina Gostyń, within Gostyń County, Greater Poland Voivodeship, in west-central Poland.
