= Krzekotowice =

- Village
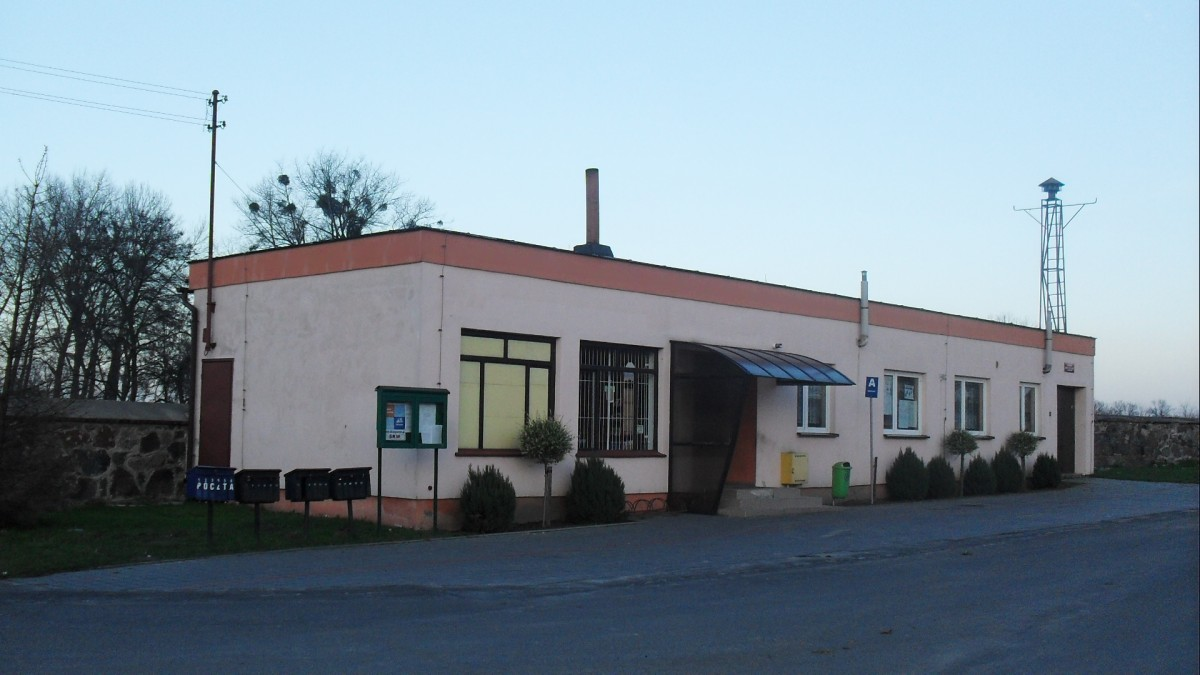

- Location within Poland
- Coordinates: 51°44′36″N 17°06′28″E
- Country: Poland
- Voivodeship: Greater Poland
- County: Gostyń
- Gmina: Pępowo

Krzekotowice [kʂɛkɔtɔˈvit͡sɛ] is a village in the administrative district of Gmina Pępowo, within Gostyń County, Greater Poland Voivodeship, in west-central Poland.
