= Dzięczynka =

- Village
- Location within Poland
- Coordinates: 51°45′10″N 16°52′28″E
- Country: Poland
- Voivodeship: Greater Poland
- County: Gostyń
- Gmina: Poniec
- Population: 35

Dzięczynka [d͡ʑɛnˈt͡ʂɨnka] is a village in the administrative district of Gmina Poniec, within Gostyń County, Greater Poland Voivodeship, in west-central Poland.
