= Babkowice =

- Village
- Location within Poland
- Coordinates: 51°47′N 17°9′E
- Country: Poland
- Voivodeship: Greater Poland
- County: Gostyń
- Gmina: Pępowo
- Population: 300

Babkowice [bapkɔˈvit͡sɛ] is a village in the administrative district of Gmina Pępowo, within Gostyń County, Greater Poland Voivodeship, in west-central Poland.
