= Śmiłowo =

Śmiłowo may refer to the following places:

- Śmiłowo, Gostyń County in Greater Poland Voivodeship (west-central Poland)
- Śmiłowo, Kuyavian-Pomeranian Voivodeship (north-central Poland)
- Śmiłowo, Masovian Voivodeship (east-central Poland)
- Śmiłowo, Piła County in Greater Poland Voivodeship (west-central Poland)
- Śmiłowo, Szamotuły County in Greater Poland Voivodeship (west-central Poland)
