= Grodzisko, Gostyń County =

Grodzisko
- Village
- Location within Poland
- Coordinates: 51°50′N 16°56′E
- Country: Poland
- Voivodeship: Greater Poland
- County: Gostyń
- Gmina: Poniec
- Population: 179

Grodzisko [ɡrɔˈd͡ʑiskɔ] is a village in the administrative district of Gmina Poniec, within Gostyń County, Greater Poland Voivodeship, in west-central Poland.
