= Kopanie =

Kopanie may refer to:

- Kopanie, Greater Poland Voivodeship, a settlement in Greater Poland Voivodeship, Poland
- Kopanie, Opole Voivodeship, a village in Opole Voivodeship, Poland
