= Wydawy, Gostyń County =

Wydawy
- Village
- Location within Poland
- Coordinates: 51°33′44″N 16°56′43″E
- Country: Poland
- Voivodeship: Greater Poland
- County: Gostyń
- Gmina: Poniec

Wydawy [vɨˈdavɨ] is a village in the administrative district of Gmina Poniec, within Gostyń County, Greater Poland Voivodeship, in west-central Poland.
