= Kościuszkowo =

- Village
- Location within Poland
- Coordinates: 51°46′58″N 17°06′19″E
- Country: Poland
- Voivodeship: Greater Poland
- County: Gostyń
- Gmina: Pępowo

Kościuszkowo [kɔɕt͡ɕuʂˈkɔvɔ] is a village in the administrative district of Gmina Pępowo, within Gostyń County, Greater Poland Voivodeship, in west-central Poland.
