= Markowo, Greater Poland Voivodeship =

Markowo
- Settlement
- Location within Poland
- Coordinates: 51°55′40″N 16°57′35″E
- Country: Poland
- Voivodeship: Greater Poland
- County: Gostyń
- Gmina: Gostyń

Markowo [marˈkɔvɔ] is a settlement in the administrative district of Gmina Gostyń, within Gostyń County, Greater Poland Voivodeship, in west-central Poland.
