= Skowronki =

Skowronki may refer to the following places:

- Skowronki, Greater Poland Voivodeship (west-central Poland)
- Skowronki, Masovian Voivodeship (east-central Poland)
- Skowronki, Pomeranian Voivodeship (north Poland)
- Skowronki, Warmian-Masurian Voivodeship (north Poland)
