= Maciejewo =

Maciejewo may refer to places in Poland:

- Maciejewo, Gostyń County in Greater Poland Voivodeship (west-central)
- Maciejewo, Koło County in Greater Poland Voivodeship (central)
- Maciejewo, Kuyavian-Pomeranian Voivodeship (north-central)
- Maciejewo, Leszno County in Greater Poland Voivodeship (west-central)
- Maciejewo, Warmian-Masurian Voivodeship (north)
- Maciejewo, West Pomeranian Voivodeship (north-west)
