= Kosowo, Gostyń County =

Kosowo
- Village
- Location within Poland
- Coordinates: 51°53′45″N 16°54′25″E
- Country: Poland
- Voivodeship: Greater Poland
- County: Gostyń
- Gmina: Gostyń
- Population: 490

Kosowo [kɔˈsɔvɔ] is a village in the administrative district of Gmina Gostyń, within Gostyń County, Greater Poland Voivodeship, in west-central Poland.
