= Magdalenki, Greater Poland Voivodeship =

Magdalenki
- Village
- Location within Poland
- Coordinates: 51°44′N 17°9′E
- Country: Poland
- Voivodeship: Greater Poland
- County: Gostyń
- Gmina: Pępowo

Magdalenki [maɡdaˈlɛnki] is a village in the administrative district of Gmina Pępowo, within Gostyń County, Greater Poland Voivodeship, in west-central Poland.
