= Tworzymirki =

Tworzymirki may refer to the following places in Poland:

- Tworzymirki, Lower Silesian Voivodeship (south-west Poland)
- Tworzymirki, Greater Poland Voivodeship (west-central Poland)
