= Teodozewo =

- Village
- Location within Poland
- Coordinates: 51°48′N 16°55′E
- Country: Poland
- Voivodeship: Greater Poland
- County: Gostyń
- Gmina: Poniec

Teodozewo [tɛɔdɔˈzɛvɔ] is a village in the administrative district of Gmina Poniec, within Gostyń County, Greater Poland Voivodeship, in west-central Poland.
