= Bogusławki, Gostyń County =

Bogusławki
- Settlement
- Location within Poland
- Coordinates: 51°53′51″N 17°1′42″E
- Country: Poland
- Voivodeship: Greater Poland
- County: Gostyń
- Gmina: Gostyń

Bogusławki [bɔɡuˈswafki] is a settlement in the administrative district of Gmina Gostyń, within Gostyń County, Greater Poland Voivodeship, in west-central Poland.
