= Marian Spychała =

Polish speedway rider

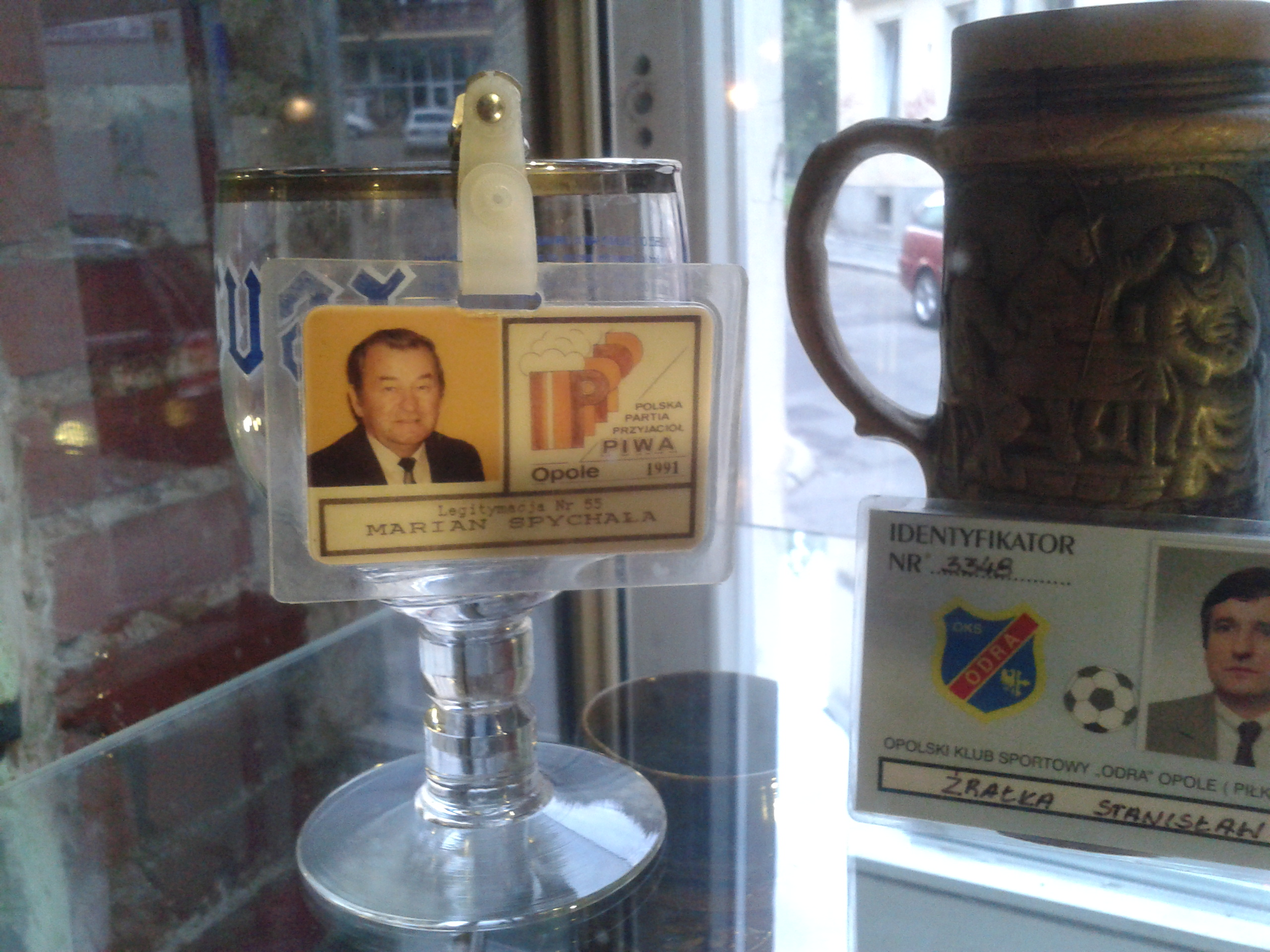
- Marian Spychała's PPPP membership card on display
- Born: 3 April 1932; Pasierby, Poland
- Died: 26 February 2015 (aged 82); Opole, Poland
- Nationality: Polish

Career history

Poland
- 1949–1956, 1959: Rawicz
- 1958: Wrocław
- 1960: Tarnów
- 1961–1970: Rzeszów

Team honours
- 1961: Polish league champion

Marian Spychała (3 April 1932 – 26 February 2015) was a motorcycle speedway rider and manager from Poland. He managed the Poland national speedway team.

== Career ==
Spychała started his speedway career with Kolejarz Rawicz during the 1949 Polish speedway season. He remained with the club for eight years, in which time he won a silver (1955) and bronze medal (1954) with the team in the Team Speedway Polish Championship.

After spells with Sparta Wrocław and Unia Tarnów, Spychała joined Stal Rzeszów for the 1961 Polish speedway season. He rode with the team for ten years until 1970 and won several team medals, including the gold medal for the league championship in 1961.

In 1970, Spychała was denied the chance to appear in the 1970 Speedway World Pairs Championship final because Poland did not send the team to the event despite qualifying for the final.

Spychała retired after the 1970 season and later began coaching. He gained significant recognition as the manager of the Polish national team manager in the late 1970s and the manager of the Kolejarz Opole team from 1994 to 2008.

Spychała fell into bad health following the murder of his daughter, who was shot by an unknown perpetrator at work. He died in 2015 after a rapid decline in his health.

On 2 July 2015, the Opole Speedway Stadium was renamed in Spychała's memory and took the name the Marian Spychała Speedway Stadium.
