= Szczodrochowo, Gostyń County =

Szczodrochowo
- Village
- Location within Poland
- Coordinates: 51°56′12″N 16°59′31″E
- Country: Poland
- Voivodeship: Greater Poland
- County: Gostyń
- Gmina: Gostyń
- Population: 90

Szczodrochowo [ʂt͡ʂɔdrɔˈxɔvɔ] is a village located in the administrative district of Gmina Gostyń, within Gostyń County, in the Greater Poland Voivodeship of west-central Poland.
