= Franciszkowo, Gostyń County =

Franciszkowo
- Village
- Location within Poland
- Coordinates: 51°48′32″N 16°52′50″E
- Country: Poland
- Voivodeship: Greater Poland
- County: Gostyń
- Gmina: Poniec
- Population: 36

Franciszkowo [frant͡ɕiʂˈkɔvɔ] is a village in the administrative district of Gmina Poniec, within Gostyń County, Greater Poland Voivodeship, in west-central Poland.
