= Krzyżanki, Gostyń County =

Village in Greater Poland Voivodeship, Poland

Krzyżanki
- Village
- Location within Poland
- Coordinates: 51°45′10″N 17°03′34″E
- Country: Poland
- Voivodeship: Greater Poland
- County: Gostyń
- Gmina: Pępowo

Krzyżanki [kʂɨˈʐanki] is a village in the administrative district of Gmina Pępowo, within Gostyń County, Greater Poland Voivodeship, in west-central Poland.
