= Stężyca =

Stężyca may refer to the following places:

- Stężyca, Greater Poland Voivodeship (west-central Poland)
- Stężyca, Lublin Voivodeship (east Poland)
- Stężyca, Pomeranian Voivodeship (north Poland)
