= Dalabuszki =

- Village
- Location within Poland
- Coordinates: 51°57′4″N 16°59′4″E
- Country: Poland
- Voivodeship: Greater Poland
- County: Gostyń
- Gmina: Gostyń
- Population: 200

Dalabuszki [dalaˈbuʂki] is a village in the administrative district of Gmina Gostyń, within Gostyń County, Greater Poland Voivodeship, in west-central Poland.
