= Brzezie-Huby =

- Village
- Location within Poland
- Coordinates: 51°51′54″N 16°59′19″E
- Country: Poland
- Voivodeship: Greater Poland
- County: Gostyń
- Gmina: Gostyń

Brzezie-Huby [ˈbʐɛʑɛ ˈxubɨ] is a village in the administrative district of Gmina Gostyń, within Gostyń County, Greater Poland Voivodeship, in west-central Poland.
