= Siemowo =

- Village
- Location within Poland
- Coordinates: 51°54′N 16°53′E
- Country: Poland
- Voivodeship: Greater Poland
- County: Gostyń
- Gmina: Gostyń
- Population: 450

Siemowo [ɕɛˈmɔvɔ] is a village in the administrative district of Gmina Gostyń, within Gostyń County, Greater Poland Voivodeship, in west-central Poland.
