= Żytowiecko =

- Village
- Location within Poland
- Coordinates: 51°49′N 16°56′E
- Country: Poland
- Voivodeship: Greater Poland
- County: Gostyń
- Gmina: Poniec

Żytowiecko [ʐɨtɔˈvjɛt͡skɔ] is a village in the administrative district of Gmina Poniec, within Gostyń County, Greater Poland Voivodeship, in west-central Poland.
