= Osowo, Gostyń County =

Osowo
- Village
- Location within Poland
- Coordinates: 51°55′54″N 16°56′0″E
- Country: Poland
- Voivodeship: Greater Poland
- County: Gostyń
- Gmina: Gostyń

Osowo ([ɔˈsɔvɔ]; German: Ossowo, 1939–45 Ossen) is a village in the administrative district of Gmina Gostyń, within Gostyń County, Greater Poland Voivodeship, in west-central Poland.
