= Włostki =

- Settlement
- Location within Poland
- Coordinates: 51°44′17″N 16°53′44″E
- Country: Poland
- Voivodeship: Greater Poland
- County: Gostyń
- Gmina: Poniec
- Population: 16

Włostki [ˈvwɔstki] is a settlement in the administrative district of Gmina Poniec, within Gostyń County, Greater Poland Voivodeship, in west-central Poland.
