= Stanisław Michał Ubysz =

Stanisław Michał Ubysz (also Michał Stanisław Ubysz) (died after 1676) - chorąży (ensign) of Gostyń, member of parliament (sejm walny) of Polish–Lithuanian Commonwealth.

He was elected as a member of parliament in 1666 and also in 1672. As a supporter of king Michał Korybut Wiśniowiecki on 20 June 1672 broke Sejm. In 1676 he was an elector of Jan III Sobieski.
