= Waszkowo =

- Village
- Location within Poland
- Coordinates: 51°45′N 16°46′E
- Country: Poland
- Voivodeship: Greater Poland
- County: Gostyń
- Gmina: Poniec
- Population: 160

Waszkowo [vaʂˈkɔvɔ] is a village in the administrative district of Gmina Poniec, within Gostyń County, Greater Poland Voivodeship, in west-central Poland. It was in Leszno Voivodeship from 1975 to 1998.

The village is locally known for its early Renaissance church. The church was founded as an Evangelic temple but later became Roman Catholic.
