= Ziółkowo, Greater Poland Voivodeship =

Ziółkowo
- Village
- Location within Poland
- Coordinates: 51°49′49″N 17°3′58″E
- Country: Poland
- Voivodeship: Greater Poland
- County: Gostyń
- Gmina: Gostyń
- Population: 310

Ziółkowo [ʑuu̯ˈkɔvɔ] is a village in the administrative district of Gmina Gostyń, within Gostyń County, Greater Poland Voivodeship, in west-central Poland.
