= Sikorzyn =

Sikorzyn may refer to the following places:

- Sikorzyn, Gostyń County in Greater Poland Voivodeship (west-central Poland)
- Sikorzyn, Kościan County in Greater Poland Voivodeship (west-central Poland)
- Sikorzyn, Rawicz County in Greater Poland Voivodeship (west-central Poland)
