= Sebastian Fechner =

Polish footballer

Personal information
- Full name: Sebastian Fechner
- Date of birth: 15 November 1983 (age 42)
- Place of birth: Gostyń, Poland
- Height: 1.80 m (5 ft 11 in)
- Position: Defender

Senior career*
Years	Team	Apps	(Gls)
2002–2003	Kania Gostyń		
2003–2004	Wisła Kraków II		
2004	Wisła Kraków	1	(0)
2005–2008	Lechia Gdańsk	66	(5)
2008–2010	Flota Świnoujście	60	(0)
2010–2012	Sandecja Nowy Sącz	34	(0)
2012–2014	Calisia Kalisz	56	(0)
2014–2021	Kania Gostyń		
- * Club domestic league appearances and goals

Sebastian Fechner (born 15 November 1983) is a Polish former professional footballer who played as a defender.

== Career ==
In the summer 2010, he joined Sandecja Nowy Sącz on a two-year contract.

== Honours ==
Lechia Gdańsk

- II liga: 2007–08
- III liga, group II: 2004–05

Kania Gostyń

- Regional league Leszno: 2015–16

== Notes ==
- Sebastian Fechner at 90minut.pl (in Polish)
