= Stężyca, Greater Poland Voivodeship =

Stężyca
- Village
- Location within Poland
- Coordinates: 51°56′27″N 16°57′37″E
- Country: Poland
- Voivodeship: Greater Poland
- County: Gostyń
- Gmina: Gostyń
- Population: 110

Stężyca [stɛ̃ˈʐɨt͡sa] is a village in the administrative district of Gmina Gostyń, within Gostyń County, Greater Poland Voivodeship, in west-central Poland.
