= Dusina, Poland =

Dusina
- Village
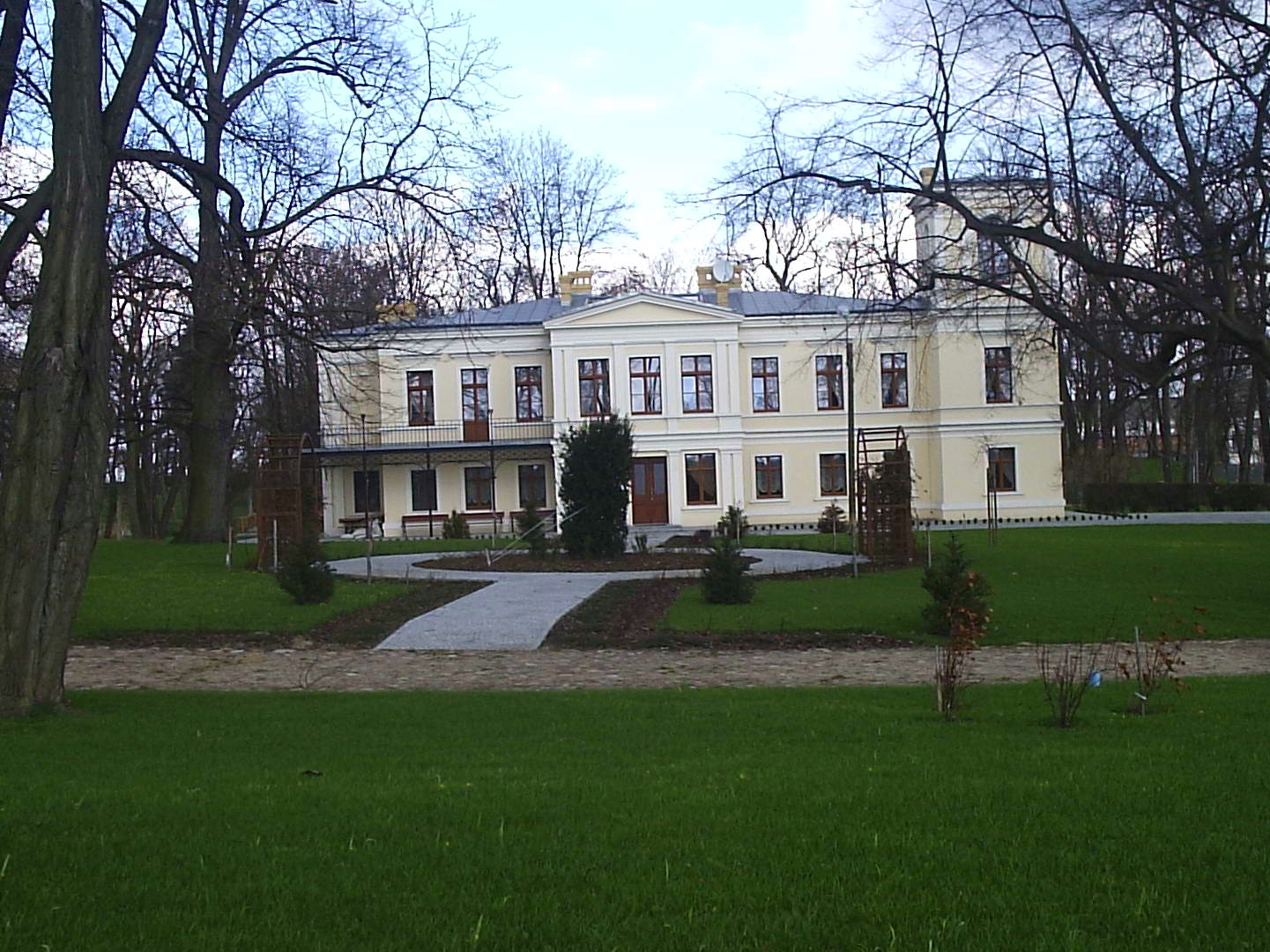
- Dusina Palace

- Location within Poland
- Coordinates: 51°54′29″N 16°59′51″E
- Country: Poland
- Voivodeship: Greater Poland
- County: Gostyń
- Gmina: Gostyń

Population
  - Total: 310
- Time zone: UTC+1 (CET)
  - Summer (DST): UTC+2 (CEST)
- Vehicle registration: PGS

Dusina [duˈɕina] is a village in the administrative district of Gmina Gostyń, within Gostyń County, Greater Poland Voivodeship, in west-central Poland.
