= Czeluścin, Gostyń County =

Czeluścin
- Village
- Location within Poland
- Coordinates: 51°44′N 17°10′E
- Country: Poland
- Voivodeship: Greater Poland
- County: Gostyń
- Gmina: Pępowo
- Population (approx.): 256

Czeluścin [t͡ʂɛˈluɕt͡ɕin] is a village in the administrative district of Gmina Pępowo, within Gostyń County, Greater Poland Voivodeship, in west-central Poland.

The village has an approximate population of 256.
