= Tworzymirki, Greater Poland Voivodeship =

Tworzymirki
- Village
- Location within Poland
- Coordinates: 51°56′59″N 17°1′14″E
- Country: Poland
- Voivodeship: Greater Poland
- County: Gostyń
- Gmina: Gostyń

Tworzymirki [tfɔʐɨˈmirki] is a village in the administrative district of Gmina Gostyń, within Gostyń County, Greater Poland Voivodeship, in west-central Poland.
