= Skowronki, Greater Poland Voivodeship =

Skowronki
- Village
- Location within Poland
- Coordinates: 51°56′5″N 17°2′26″E
- Country: Poland
- Voivodeship: Greater Poland
- County: Gostyń
- Gmina: Gostyń

Skowronki [skɔˈvrɔnki] is a village in Gmina Gostyń, Gostyń County, Greater Poland Voivodeship, Poland.
