= Pępowo, Greater Poland Voivodeship =

Pępowo
- Village
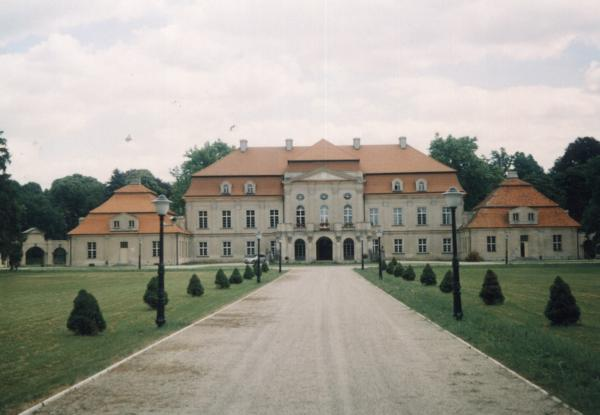
- Pępowo Palace

- Location within Poland
- Coordinates: 51°45′43″N 17°7′9″E
- Country: Poland
- Voivodeship: Greater Poland
- County: Gostyń
- Gmina: Pępowo

Population
  - Total: 1,780

Pępowo [pɛmˈpɔvɔ] is a village in Gostyń County, Greater Poland Voivodeship, in west-central Poland. It is the seat of the gmina (administrative district) called Gmina Pępowo.
