= Stary Gostyń =

- Village
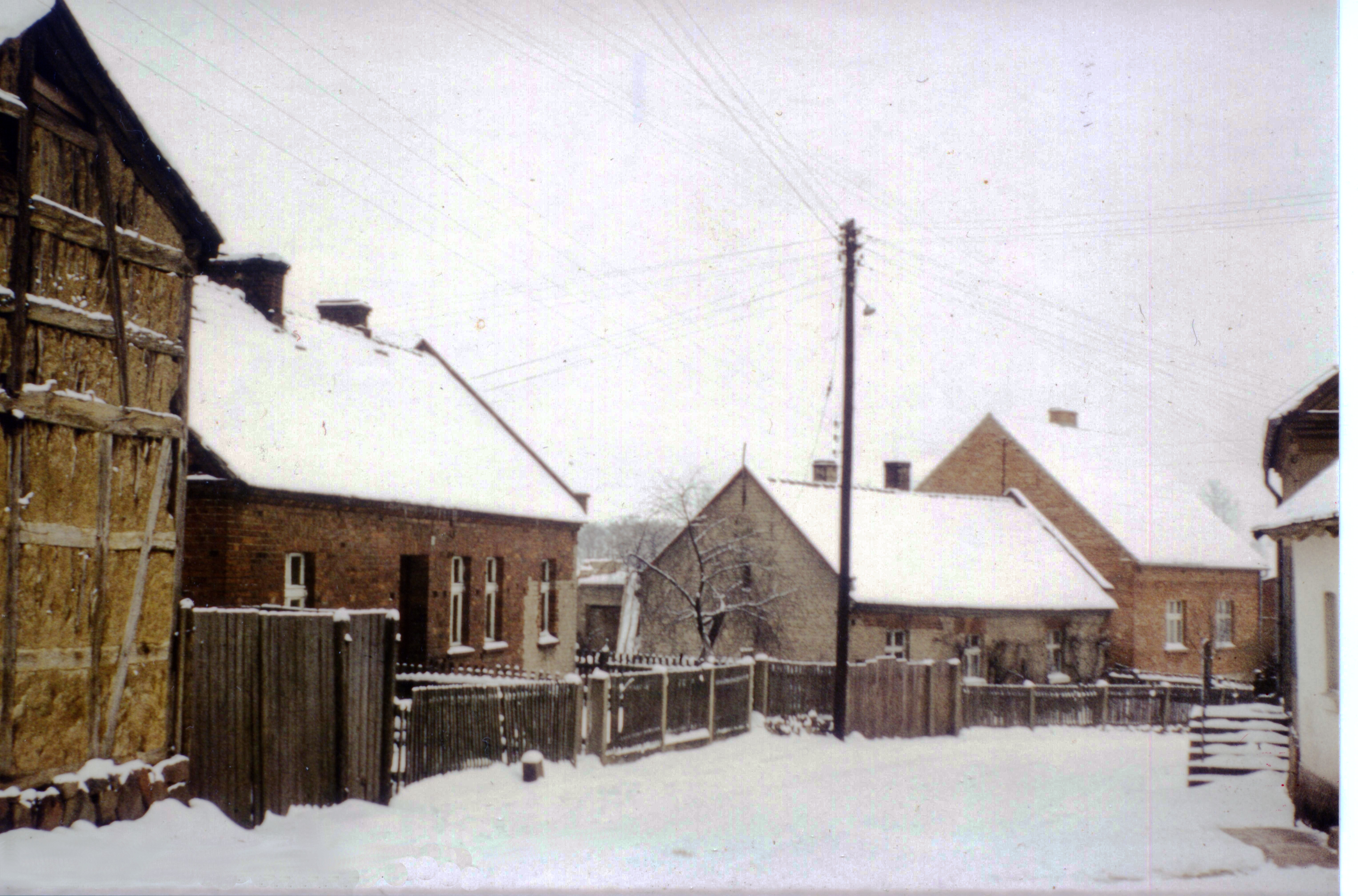

- Location within Poland
- Coordinates: 51°54′8″N 16°57′30″E
- Country: Poland
- Voivodeship: Greater Poland
- County: Gostyń
- Gmina: Gostyń
- Population: 440

Stary Gostyń [ˈstarɨ ˈɡɔstɨɲ] is a village in the administrative district of Gmina Gostyń, within Gostyń County, Greater Poland Voivodeship, in west-central Poland.

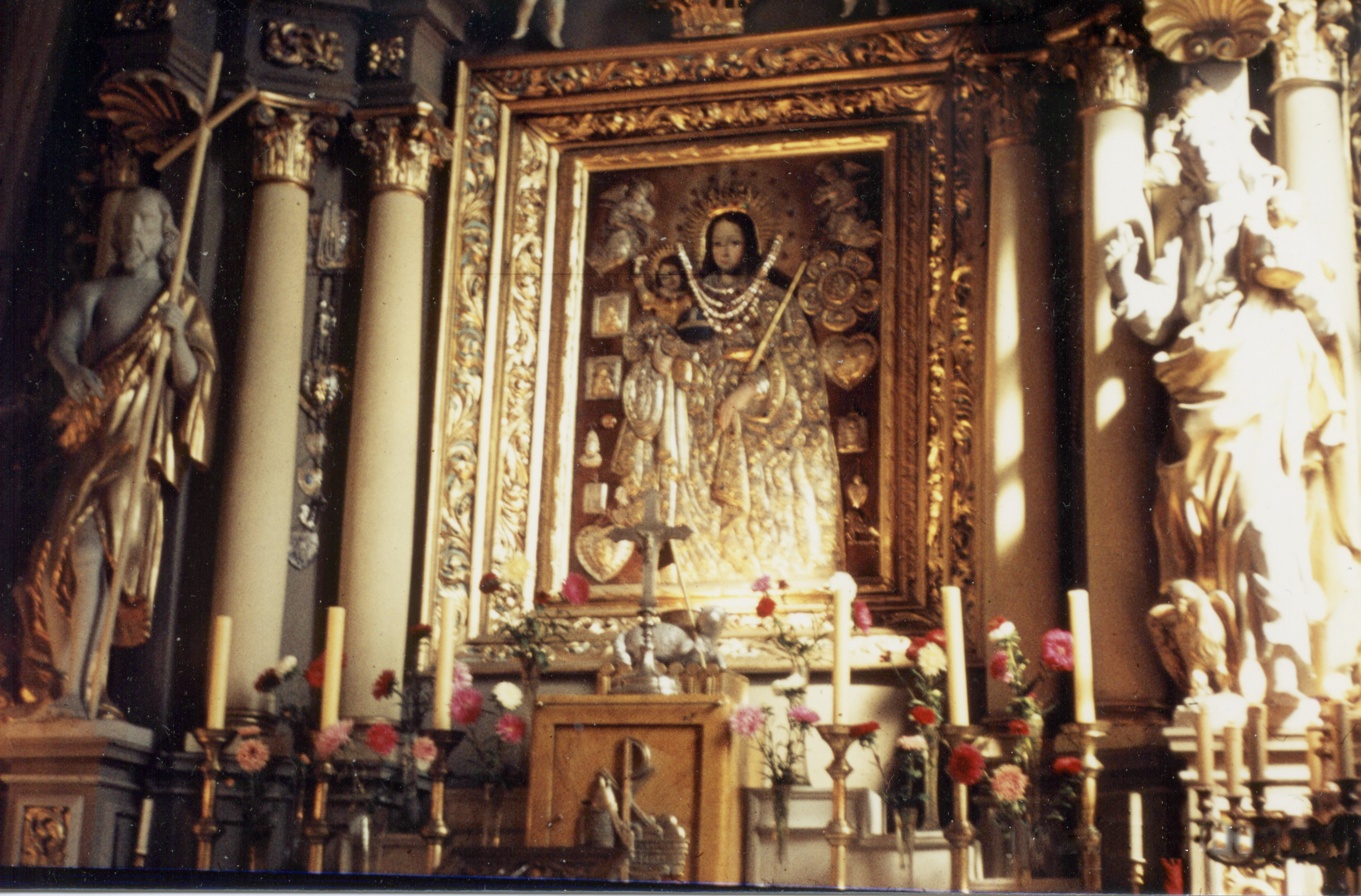
Our Lady of Stary Gostyń (1645).
