= Marian Gorynia =

Polish economist, professor and rector

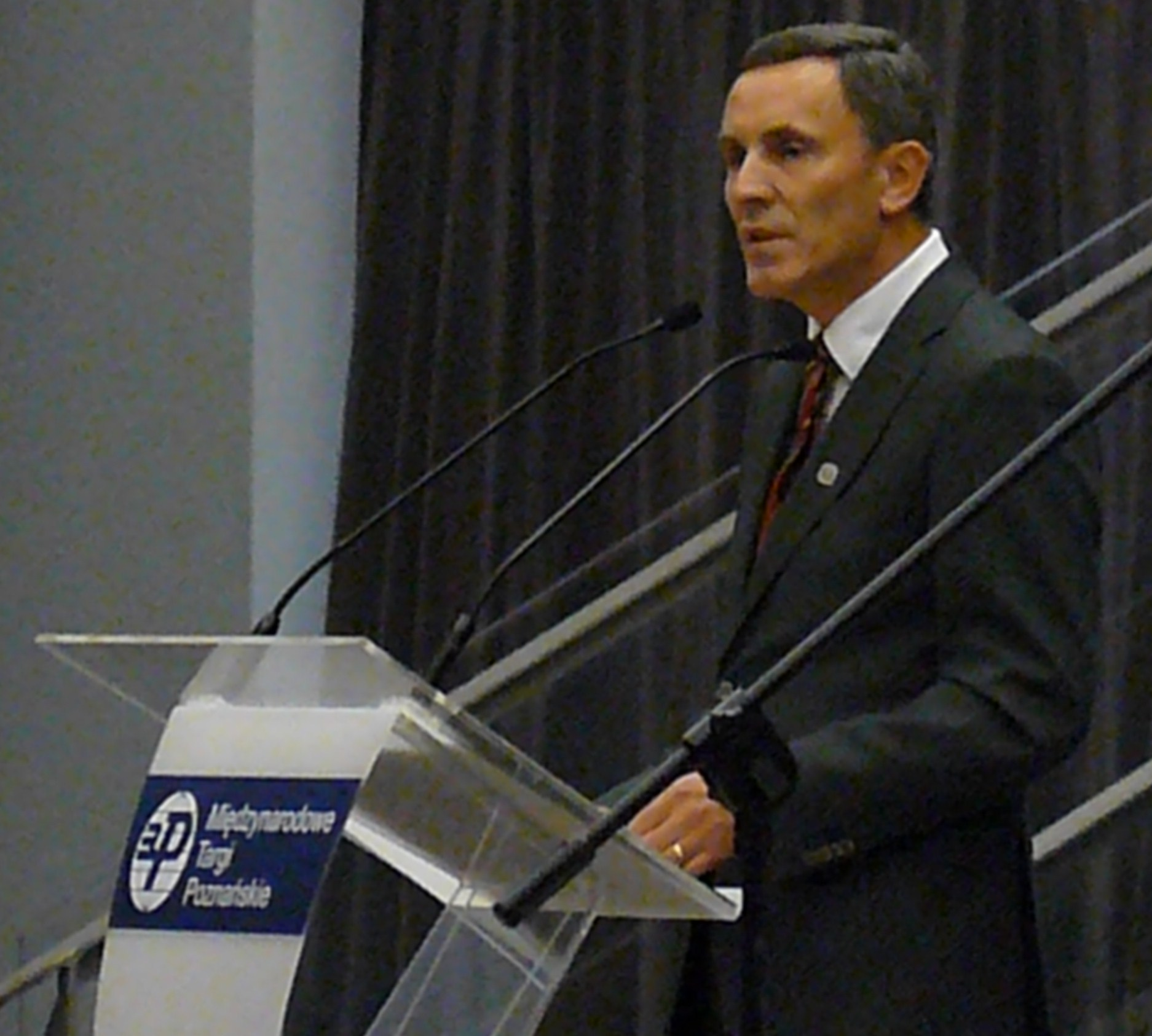
Gorynia in 2010

Marian Gorynia (born 7 October 1956) is a Polish economist and professor. Between 2008 and 2016, he was the rector of the Poznań University of Economics.

== Biography ==
Gorynia was born 7 October 1956 in Dusina, He earned a bachelor of Arts degree in 1980 at the University of Economics in Poznań. He was the rector of the University of Economics in Poznań between 2008 and 2016.

In 2000 he received the title of professor of economics.

== Awards ==
=== Individual ===
- 1996: 'Teoria i polityka regulacji mezosystemów gospodarczych a transformacja post-socjalistycznej gospodarki polskiej', presented by the Minister of National Education.
- 1999: Book 'Zachowania przedsiębiorstw w okresie transformacji. Mikroekonomia przejścia', presented by the Minister of National Education and the Polish Academy of Sciences.
- 2008: First grade prized book 'Strategie zagranicznej ekspansji przedsiębiorstw', presented by the Minister of Science and Higher Education.
- 2009: Prize from the Polish Economic Society for the book 'Strategie zagranicznej ekspansji przedsiębiorstw'.
- 2009, 2012: Second Grade Individual Prizes from the Minister of Science and Higher Education for organizational achievements.
- 2010, 2011: First Grade Individual Prizes from the Minister of Science and Higher Education for organizational achievements.
- 2013: Prize from the Deputy Prime Minister and Minister of the Economy for outstanding achievements in promoting exports.
- 2013: Second-Grade Individual Prize from the Minister of Science and Higher Education for organizational achievements.

=== Team ===
- 2001: Book 'Strategie przedsiębiorstw w biznesie międzynarodowym', worked with K. Fonfara, E. Najlepszy and J. Schroeder. Gorynia was the scientific editor.
- 2003: Book 'Luka konkurencyjna na poziomie przedsiębiorstwa a przystąpienie Polski do Unii Europejskiej'.
- 2004: Prize from the Committee on Science Organization and Management of the Polish Academy of Sciences for the teamwork 'Luka konkurencyjna na poziomie przedsiębiorstwa a przystąpienie Polski do Unii Europejskiej'.
- 2006: Book 'Strategie firm polskich wobec ekspansji inwestorów zagranicznych', worked with M. Bartosik-Purgat, B. Jankowska, R. Owczarzak. Presented by the Minister of Science and Higher Education.
- 2012: Book 'Wejście Polski do strefy euro a międzynarodowa konkurencyjność i internacjonalizacja polskich przedsiębiorstw', worked with M. Dzikowska, M. Pietrzykoski and P. Tarka. Gorynia and B. Jankowska were scientific editors.

=== Decorations, medals, badges, etc. ===
- 1980: Summa cum laude
- 1980: PRIMUS INTER PARES Nicolas Copernicus Golden Badge
- 1989: Honorary Badge of the City of Poznań
- 2002: Silver Cross of Merit
- 2007: Silver Medal "Labor Omnia Vincit"
- 2009: Medal of the 30th Anniversary of the Restitution of the Order of St Stanislaus, Bishop and Martyr for charity work.
- 2011: Honorary Hippolytus Statuette and the title of Organic Work Leader.
- 2012: Commemorative Medal "Ad Perpetuam Rei Memoriam" from the Governor of Wielkopolska Province.
