= Sikorzyn, Gostyń County =

Sikorzyn
- Village
- Location within Poland
- Coordinates: 51°50′N 16°58′E
- Country: Poland
- Voivodeship: Greater Poland
- County: Gostyń
- Gmina: Gostyń
- Population: 290

Sikorzyn [ɕiˈkɔʐɨn] is a village in the administrative district of Gmina Gostyń, within Gostyń County, Greater Poland Voivodeship, in west-central Poland.
