= Maciejewo, Gostyń County =

Maciejewo
- Settlement
- Location within Poland
- Coordinates: 51°49′32″N 16°54′26″E
- Country: Poland
- Voivodeship: Greater Poland
- County: Gostyń
- Gmina: Poniec
- Population: 11

Maciejewo [mat͡ɕɛˈjɛvɔ] is a settlement in the administrative district of Gmina Poniec, within Gostyń County, Greater Poland Voivodeship, in west-central Poland.
