= Klony, Gostyń County =

Klony
- Settlement
- Location within Poland
- Coordinates: 51°53′42″N 16°56′19″E
- Country: Poland
- Voivodeship: Greater Poland
- County: Gostyń
- Gmina: Gostyń
- Population: 5

Klony [ˈklɔnɨ] is a settlement in the administrative district of Gmina Gostyń, within Gostyń County, Greater Poland Voivodeship, in west-central Poland.
