= Kopanie, Greater Poland Voivodeship =

Kopanie
- Settlement
- Location within Poland
- Coordinates: 51°50′21″N 16°51′45″E
- Country: Poland
- Voivodeship: Greater Poland
- County: Gostyń
- Gmina: Poniec
- Population: 58

Kopanie [kɔˈpaɲɛ] is a settlement in the administrative district of Gmina Poniec, within Gostyń County, Greater Poland Voivodeship, in west-central Poland.
