= Pasierby =

- Village
- Location within Poland
- Coordinates: 51°43′N 17°6′E
- Country: Poland
- Voivodeship: Greater Poland
- County: Gostyń
- Gmina: Pępowo

Pasierby [paˈɕɛrbɨ] (German: Pasierby; 1939-1945: Waisenort) is a village in the administrative district of Gmina Pępowo, within Gostyń County, Greater Poland Voivodeship, in west-central Poland.
