= Gmina Gostyń =

Gmina Gostyń Gostyń Commune
- Gmina
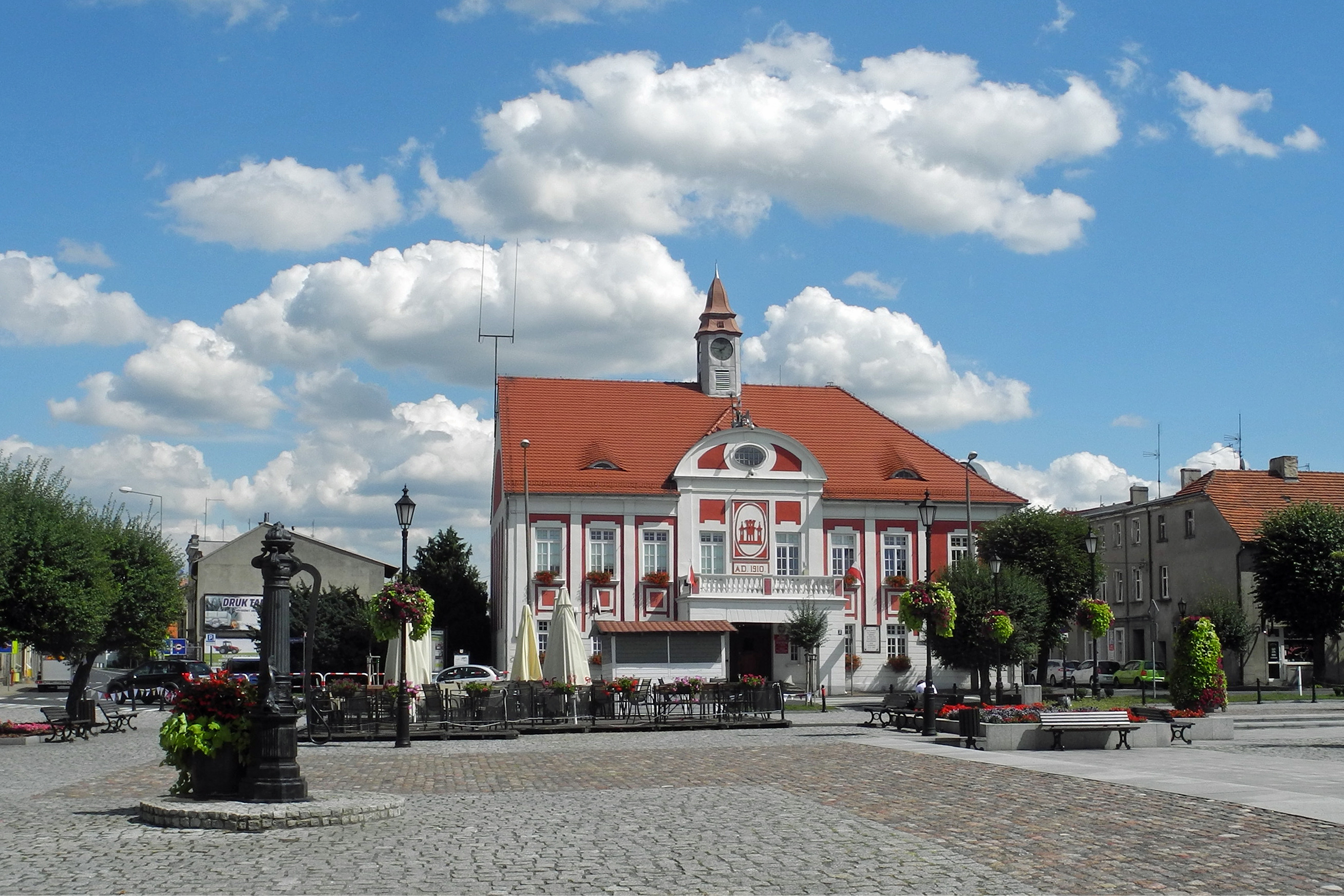
- Town Hall in Gostyń, seat of the gmina office

- Coat of arms

- Coordinates (Gostyń): 51°52′45″N 17°0′45″E
- Country: Poland
- Voivodeship: Greater Poland
- County: Gostyń
- Seat: Gostyń

Area
  - Total: 136.91 km^{2} (52.86 sq mi)

Population (2006)
  - Total: 27,860
  - Density: 203.5/km^{2} (527.0/sq mi)
  - Urban: 20,588
  - Rural: 7,272
- Time zone: UTC+1 (CET)
  - Summer (DST): UTC+2 (CEST)
- Vehicle registration: PGS
- Website: http://www.gostyn.pl/

Gmina Gostyń is an urban-rural gmina (administrative district) in Gostyń County, Greater Poland Voivodeship, in west-central Poland. Its seat is the town of Gostyń, which lies approximately 59 kilometres (37 mi) south of the regional capital Poznań.

The gmina covers an area of 136.91 square kilometres (52.9 sq mi), and as of 2006 its total population is 27,860 (out of which the population of Gostyń amounts to 20,588, and the population of the rural part of the gmina is 7,272).

== Villages ==
Apart from the town of Gostyń, Gmina Gostyń contains the villages and settlements of Aleksandrowo, Bogusławki, Bronisławki, Brzezie, Brzezie-Huby, Czachorowo, Czajkowo, Dalabuszki, Daleszyn, Dusina, Gaj, Gola, Klony, Kosowo, Krajewice, Kunowo, Malewo, Markowo, Miranowo, Osowo, Ostrowo, Otówko, Pijanowskie Huby, Płaczkowo, Poraj, Siemowo, Sikorzyn, Skowronki, Stankowo, Stary Gostyń, Stężyca, Szczodrochowo, Tworzymirki, Witoldowo and Ziółkowo.

== Neighbouring gminas ==
Gmina Gostyń is bordered by the gminas of Dolsk, Krobia, Krzemieniewo, Krzywiń, Piaski and Poniec.
