= Gostyń =

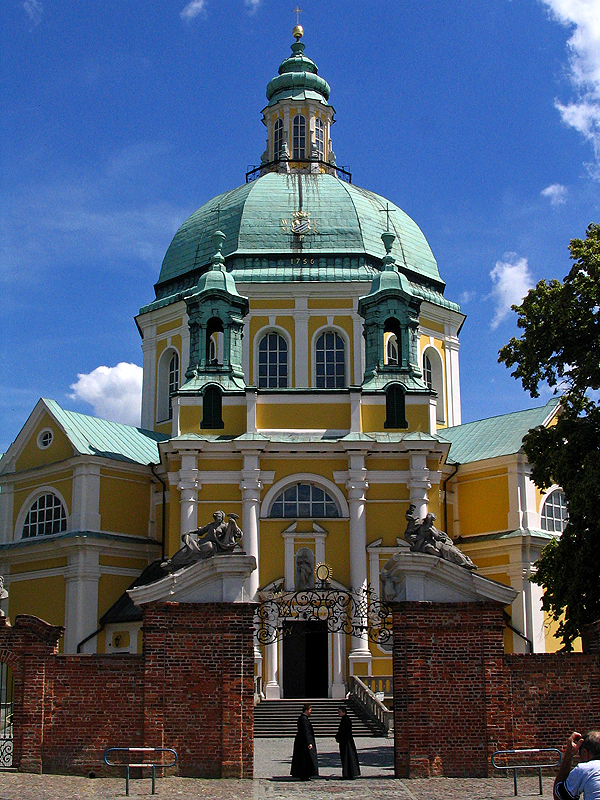
- Basilica on the Holy Mountain, Głogówko

- Coat of arms

- Location within Poland
- Coordinates: 51°52′45″N 17°0′45″E
- Country: Poland
- Voivodeship: Greater Poland
- County: Gostyń
- Gmina: Gostyń
- Founded: 1270s
- Town rights: 1278

Area
  - Total: 10.79 km^{2} (4.17 sq mi)
- Elevation: 90 m (300 ft)

Population (2023)
  - Total: 27,846
  - Density: 2,581/km^{2} (6,684/sq mi)
- Time zone: UTC+1 (CET)
  - Summer (DST): UTC+2 (CEST)
- Postal code: 63–800
- Vehicle registration: PGS
- Website: http://www.gostyn.pl/

Gostyń ([ˈɡɔstɨɲ]) is a town in western Poland, seat of the Gostyń County and Gmina Gostyń in the Greater Poland Voivodeship (from 1975 to 1998 in Leszno Voivodship). According to 31 December 2023 data its population was 27,846.

The main landmark of Gostyń is Basilica of Święta Góra (Holy Hill), the main Marian sanctuary of the archdiocese of Poznań and a masterpiece of Pompeo Ferrari, with the monastery of the Oratory of Saint Philip Neri.

== Geography ==
The total area of Gostyń is 10.79 square kilometres (4.17 sq mi). The town comprises 1% of the area of the county and 8% of the commune, according to Główny Urząd Statystyczny.

== Transport ==
National Road 12 used to pass through Gostyń. On Friday 12 December 2025 a new bypass opened which diverted the road to the north of the town. National Road 12 connects Łęknica on the German border to Dorohusk-Berdyszcze on the Ukrainian border. National Road 12 intersects with major motorways and expressways, including the A18 near Żary and the A1 near Piotrków Trybunalski.

There is no railway connection to Gostyń, however local buses link it to nearby Leszno and Jarocin.

== History ==
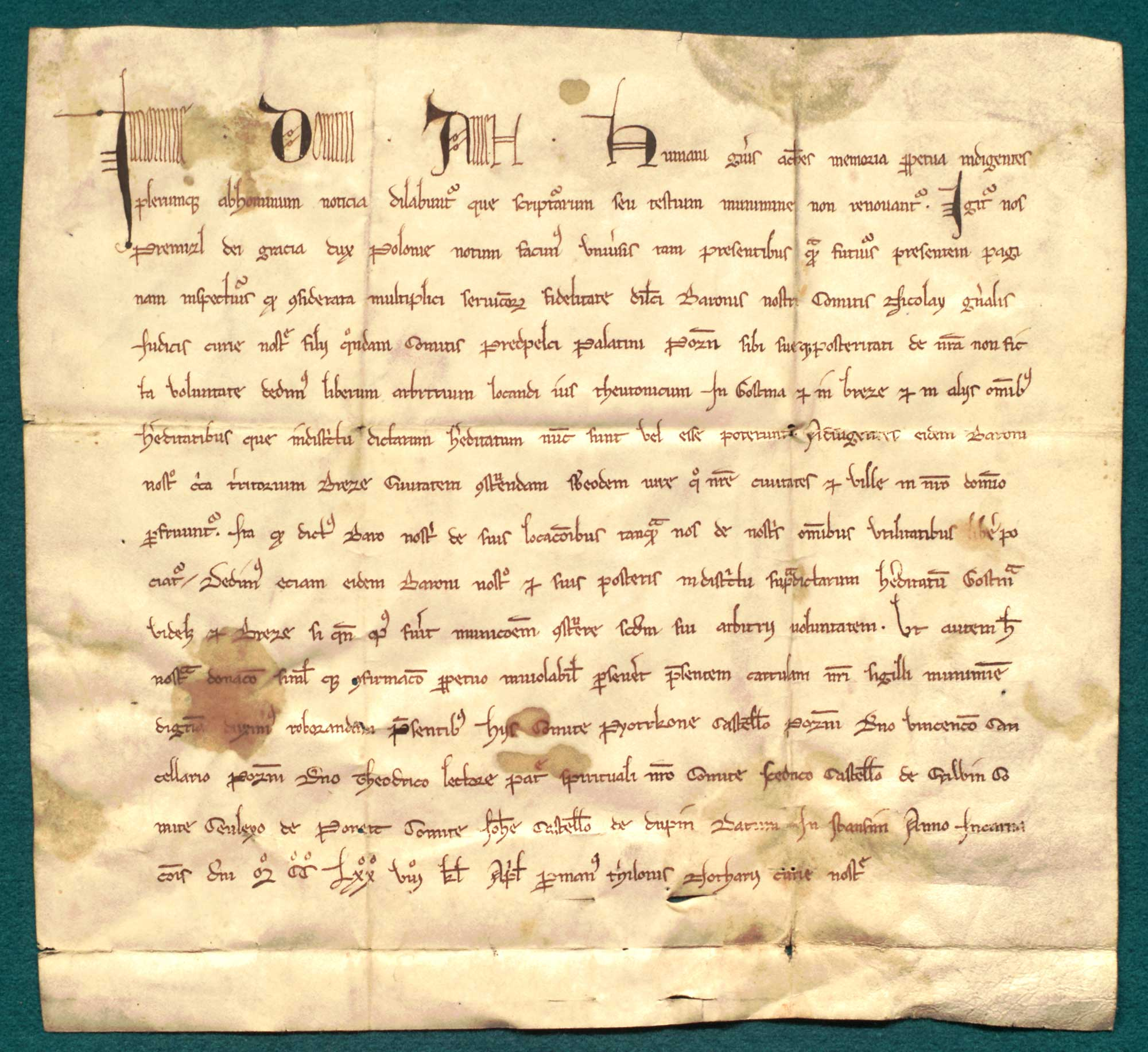
A 1278 document establishing Gostyń and granting town rights, issued by Przemysł II

Gostyń dates back to the 13th century. The town was founded by local nobleman Mikołaj Przedpełkowic and granted town rights in 1278 by Przemysł II. It was named after the nearby village of Gostyń, which since took the name of Stary Gostyń ("Old Gostyń"). Gostyń was a private town, administratively located in the Kościan County in the Poznań Voivodeship in the Greater Poland Province. It developed as a local centre of trade and crafts. In the 16th century Gostyń was an important regional Reformation center, and in 1565 a synod of various Protestants of Greater Poland was held there. The town suffered during the 17th-century Swedish invasions and an epidemic in the 18th century. In the 18th century one of two main routes connecting Warsaw and Dresden ran through the town and Kings Augustus II the Strong and Augustus III of Poland often traveled that route.

In 1793 Gostyń was annexed by Prussia during the Second Partition of Poland and it was known as Gostyn in German. After the successful Greater Poland uprising of 1806, it was regained by the Poles and included within short-lived Duchy of Warsaw, and in 1815 it was re-annexed by Prussia. Gostyń was a center of Polish resistance to Germanisation policies. In 1835 Kasyno Gostyńskie was founded, a significant local Polish organization, which under the disguise of social activity conducted economic, educational and library activities. The Prussians abolished the organization in 1846 and its library's collection was moved to Poznań. Gostyń was the site of preparations for the Greater Poland uprising (1848), and during the uprising, it was captured by the Prussians in April 1848. Many inhabitants took part in the next Greater Poland uprising (1918–19), after which Gostyń joined the re-established Polish state.

=== World War II ===
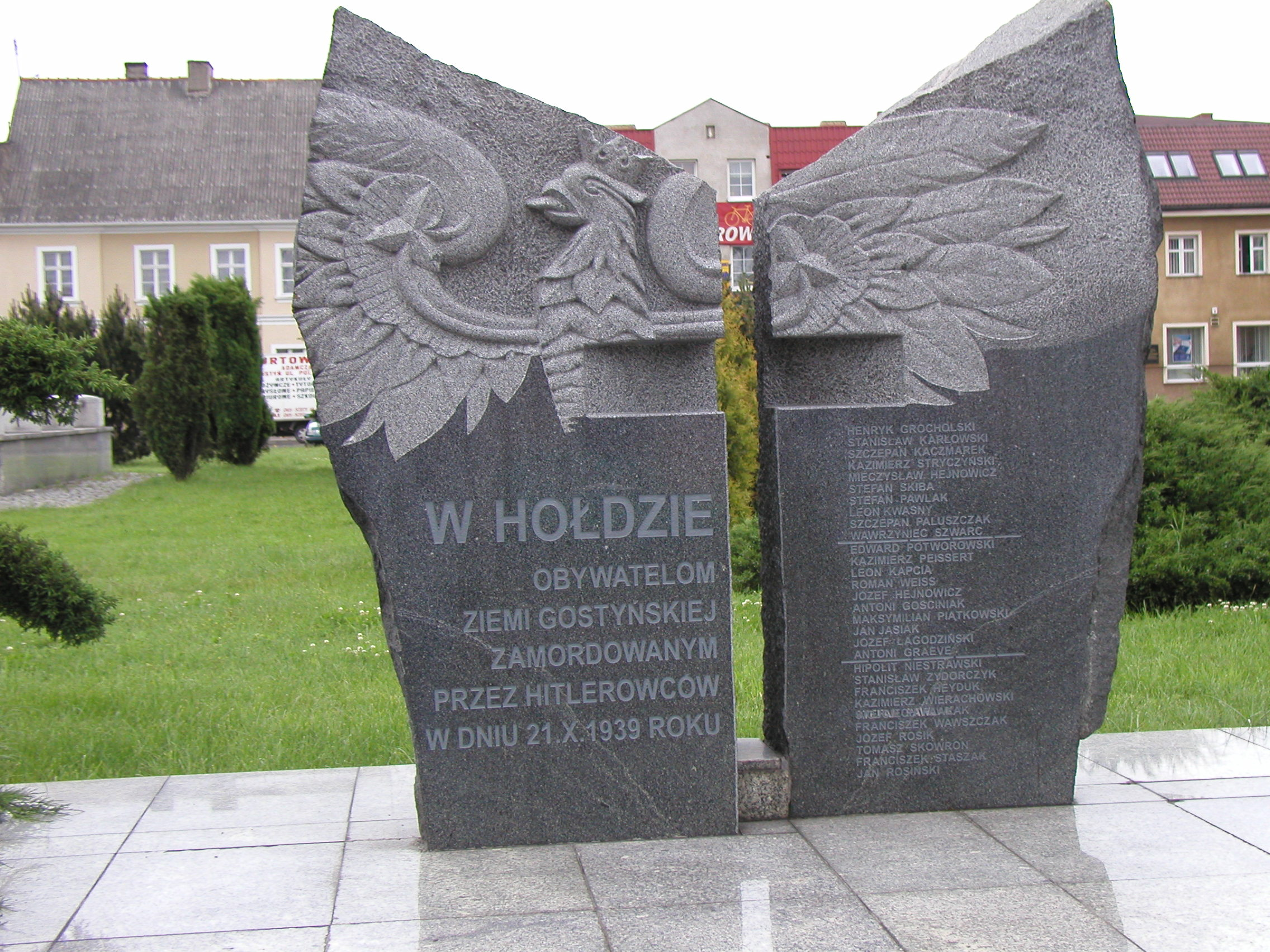
Monument to the victims of the 21 October 1939 execution at the Market Square

During the German invasion of Poland, which started World War II, Gostyń was captured by the Wehrmacht on 6 September 1939. During the Nazi German occupation of Poland, Gostyń became the site of public executions, arrests and expulsions of Poles. First mass arrests and executions were carried out in September 1939. On 21 October 1939 some 30 citizens of the town whose names were listed in the Sonderfahndungsbuch Polen (Special Prosecution Book-Poland) prepared by local German minority, were executed by an Einsatzkommando. Among the murdered were Gostyń's mayor Hipolit Niestrawski, Polish activists, officials, craftsmen and former Greater Poland insurgents. It was one of many massacres of Poles committed by Germany on 20–23 October 1939 across the region in attempt to pacify and terrorize the Polish population. Mass expulsions began on 4 December 1939, with up to 2,000 Poles deported to General Government on the orders of SS-Standartenführer Ernst Damzog stationing in Poznań. Between spring of 1940 and 15 March 1941 additional 3,222 were deported. Władysław Nawrocki, Polish officer and pre-war chairman of the local football club Kania Gostyń, was murdered by the Soviets in the Katyn massacre in 1940.

Despite such circumstances, local Poles organized an underground resistance movement, which included structures of the Polish Underground State, the secret youth organization Tajny Hufiec, and the Czarny Legion organization, which was founded in 1940. Czarny Legion was crushed by the Germans in 1941. Several dozens of its members were arrested and then brutally tortured in a prison in Rawicz. After a Nazi show trial in Zwickau in 1942, 12 members were executed in Dresden, and several dozen were imprisoned in Nazi concentration camps, where 37 of them died. German occupation ended in 1945.

== Demographics ==
Data for 31 December 2003:

	Total	%	Female	%	Male	%
Population	20,929	100	10 886	52	10 043	48
employed	6 630	32	3 103	15	3 527	17
population density (persons/km^{2})	1939		990		913	

Data for 30 June 2004:

	Total		%	Female	%	Male	%
population	20,746	↓	100	10 798	52	9 948	48
population density (persons/km^{2})	1922						

== Culture ==
There is a local historical museum in Gostyń (Muzeum w Gostyniu) and a private car museum (Auto-Muzeum w Gostyniu).

== Sports ==
The local football club is Kania Gostyń. It competes in the lower leagues.

== Gallery ==
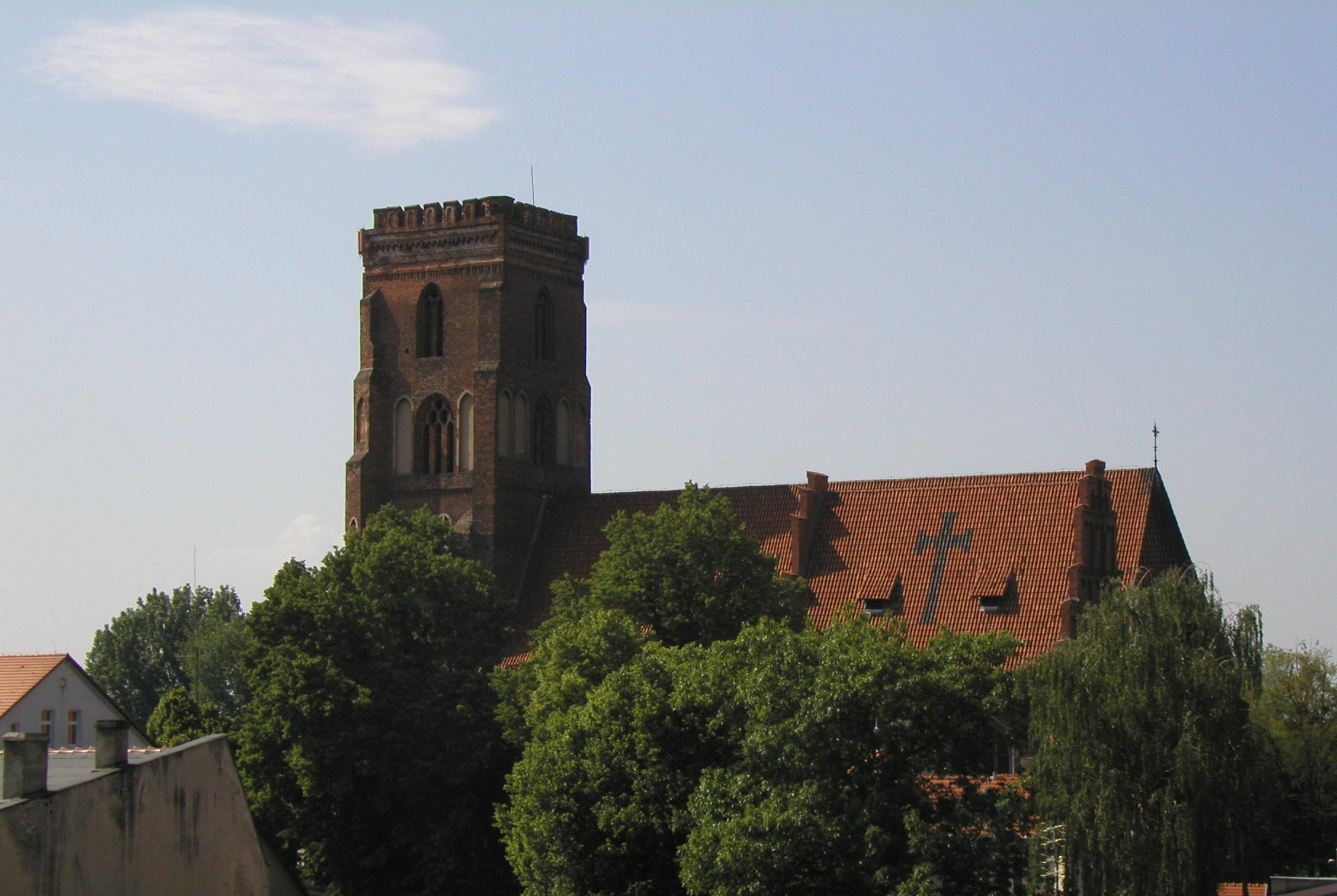
Gothic St. Margaret's Church

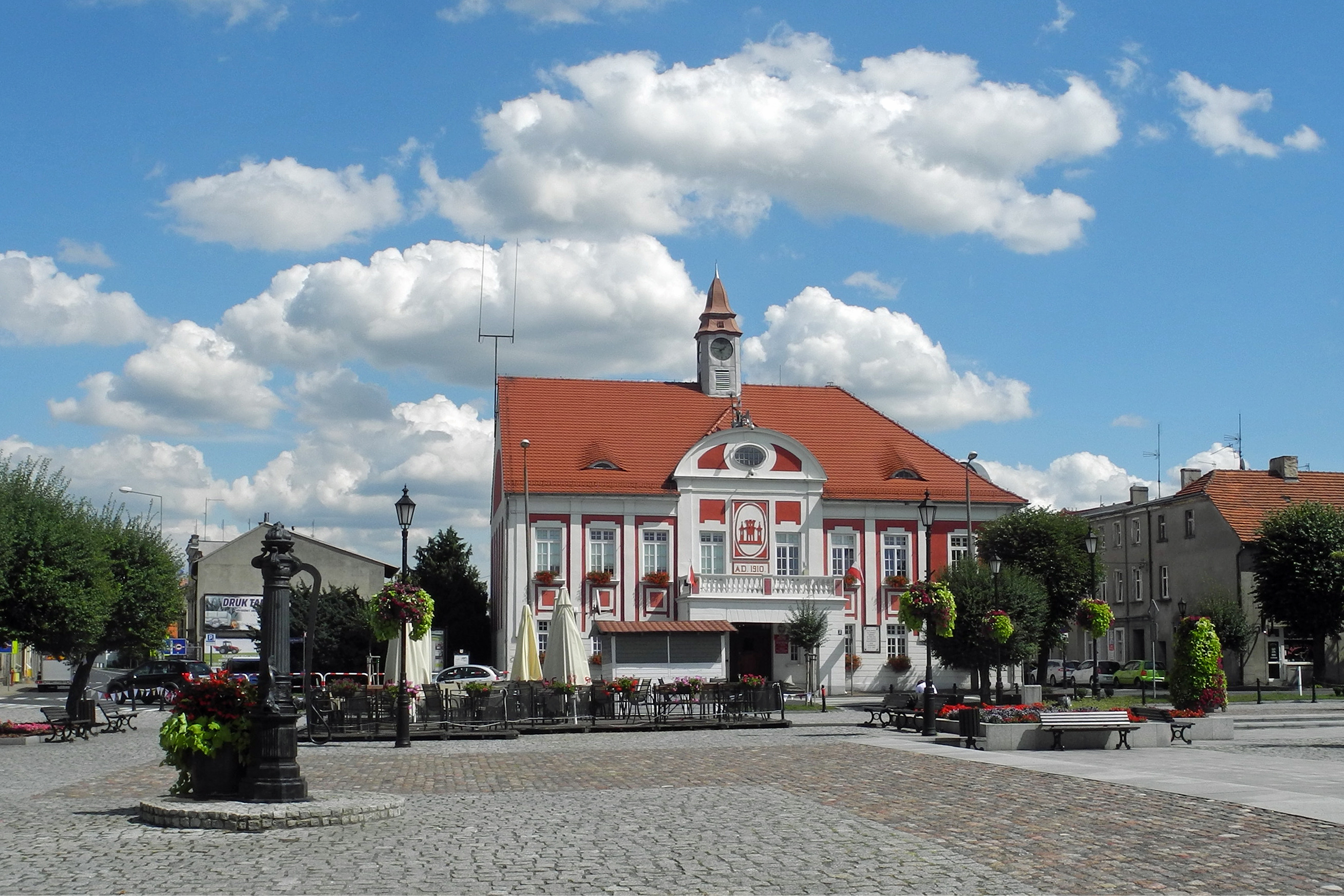
Town Hall at the Market Square (Rynek)

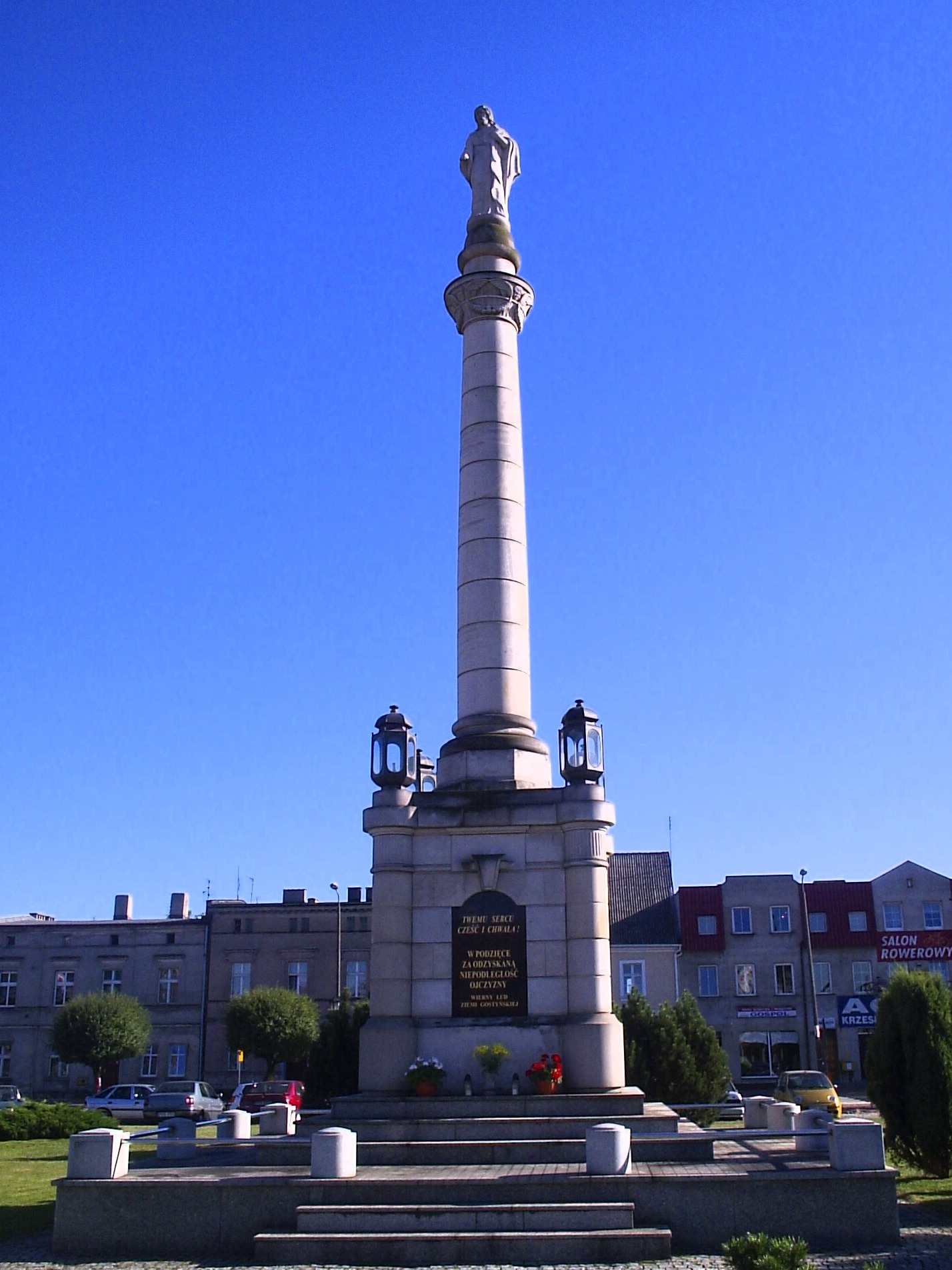
Independence monument at the Market Square

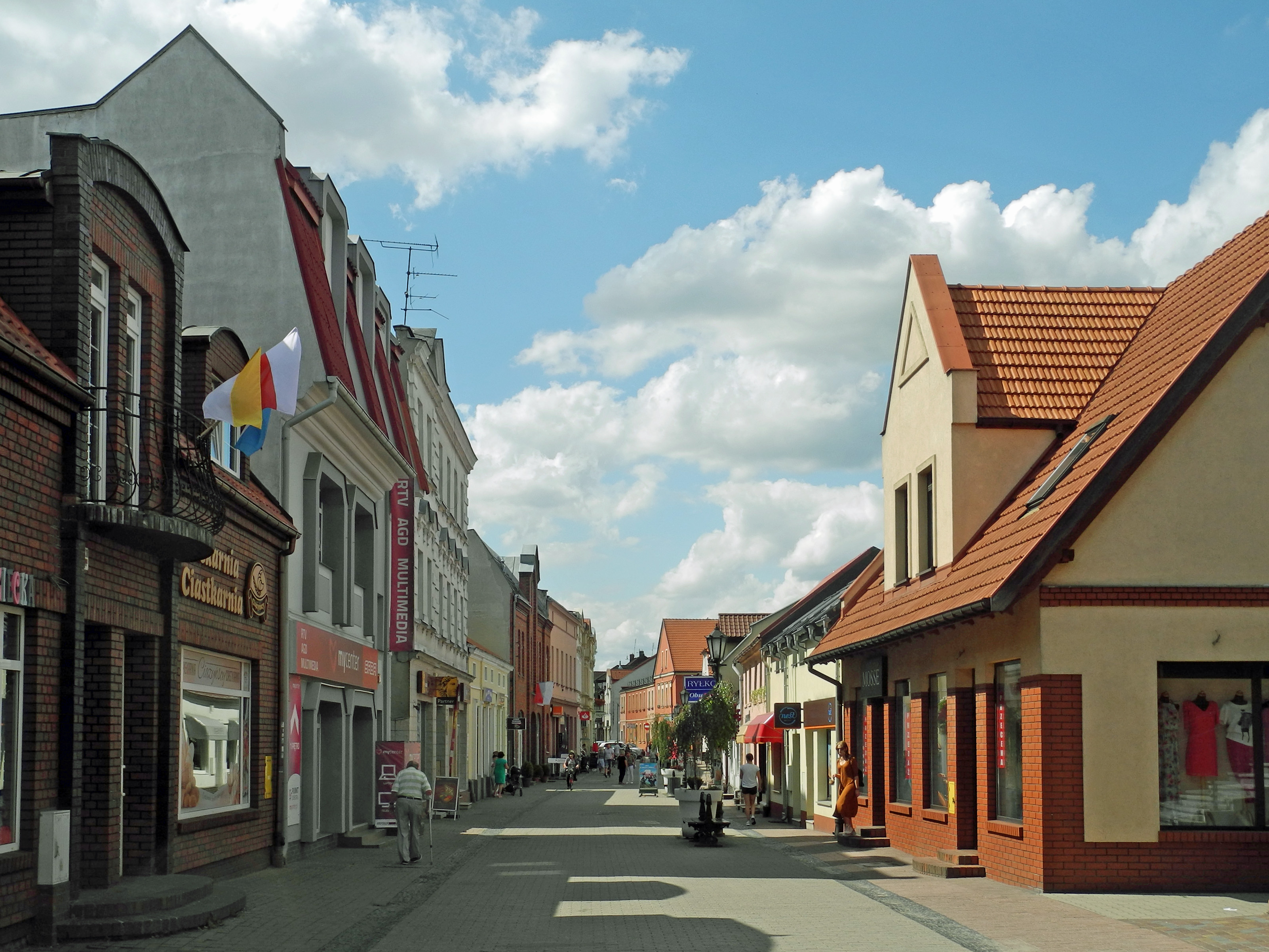
Town centre

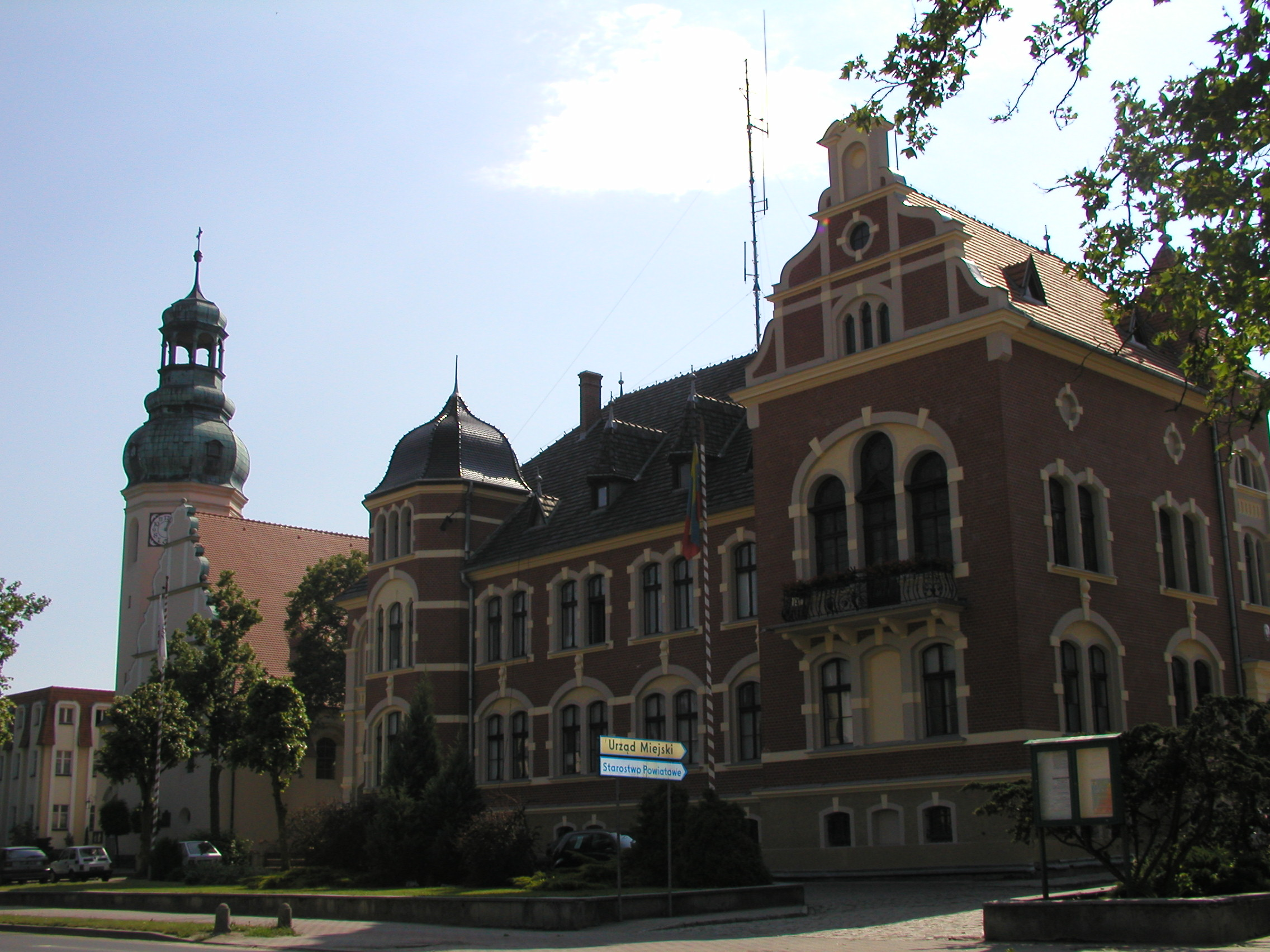
Holy Spirit Church and Gostyń County office

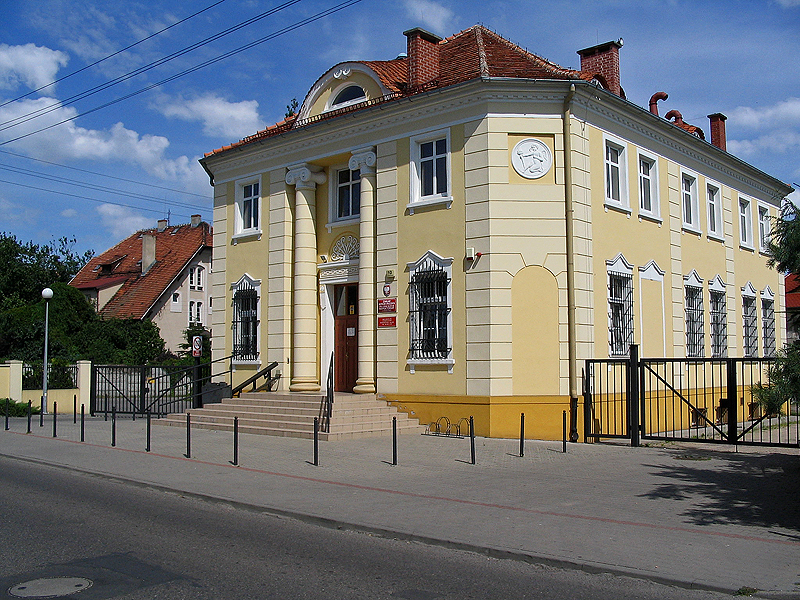
ZUS office

== Notable people ==
- Wojciech Długoraj (c. 1557-c. 1619), Polish Renaissance composer
- Kuba Giermaziak (born 1990), Polish racing driver
- Andrzej Juskowiak (born 1970), former Polish footballer, with 39 games played for the Poland national football team
- Wojciech Kaczmarek (born 1983), Polish footballer
- Sebastian Fechner (born 1983), Polish footballer
- Henry J. Messing (1847–1913), German-American rabbi
- Paweł Piotrowski (born 1985), Polish Paralympian athlete
- Bartosz Rymaniak (born 1989), Polish footballer
- Agata Sobczyk (born 1988), Polish economist and politician
