= Gostyń County =

Gostyń County Powiat gostyński
- County
- Flag Coat of arms

- Location within the voivodeship
- Coordinates (Gostyń): 51°52′45″N 17°0′45″E
- Country: Poland
- Voivodeship: Greater Poland
- Seat: Gostyń
- Gminas: Total 7: Gmina Borek Wielkopolski; Gmina Gostyń; Gmina Krobia; Gmina Pępowo; Gmina Piaski; Gmina Pogorzela; Gmina Poniec

Area
  - Total: 810.34 km^{2} (312.87 sq mi)

Population (2006)
  - Total: 75,683
  - Density: 93.397/km^{2} (241.90/sq mi)
  - Urban: 31,945
  - Rural: 43,738
- Car plates: PGS
- Website: www.powiat.gostyn.pl

Gostyń County (Polish: powiat gostyński) is a unit of territorial administration and local government (powiat) in Greater Poland Voivodeship, west-central Poland. It came into being on January 1, 1999, as a result of the Polish local government reforms passed in 1998. Its administrative seat and largest town is Gostyń, which lies 59 kilometres (37 mi) south of the regional capital Poznań. The county contains four other towns: Krobia, 11 km (7 mi) south of Gostyń, Poniec, 20 km (12 mi) south-west of Gostyń, Borek Wielkopolski, 17 km (11 mi) east of Gostyń, and Pogorzela, 17 km (11 mi) south-east of Gostyń.

The county covers an area of 810.34 square kilometres (312.9 sq mi). As of 2006 its total population is 75,683, out of which the population of Gostyń is 20,588, that of Krobia is 4,022, that of Poniec is 2,875, that of Borek Wielkopolski is 2,486, that of Pogorzela is 1,974, and the rural population is 43,738.

== Neighbouring counties ==
Gostyń County is bordered by Śrem County to the north, Jarocin County to the east, Krotoszyn County to the south-east, Rawicz County to the south, Leszno County to the west and Kościan County to the north-west.

== Administrative divisions ==
The county is subdivided into seven gminas (five urban-rural and two rural). These are listed in the following table, in descending order of population.

| Gmina | Type | Area (km^{2}) | Population (2006) | Seat |
|---|---|---|---|---|
| Gmina Gostyń | urban-rural | 136.9 | 27,860 | Gostyń |
| Gmina Krobia | urban-rural | 129.6 | 12,792 | Krobia |
| Gmina Piaski | rural | 100.7 | 8,293 | Piaski |
| Gmina Poniec | urban-rural | 132.3 | 7,866 | Poniec |
| Gmina Borek Wielkopolski | urban-rural | 127.6 | 7,724 | Borek Wielkopolski |
| Gmina Pępowo | rural | 86.7 | 5,991 | Pępowo |
| Gmina Pogorzela | urban-rural | 96.5 | 5,157 | Pogorzela |
