= Kuczyna, Greater Poland Voivodeship =

Kuczyna
- Village
- Location within Poland
- Coordinates: 51°45′N 16°58′E
- Country: Poland
- Voivodeship: Greater Poland
- County: Gostyń
- Gmina: Krobia
- Population: 314
- Time zone: UTC+1 (CET)
  - Summer (DST): UTC+2 (CEST)
- Vehicle registration: PGS

Kuczyna [kuˈt͡ʂɨna] is a village in the administrative district of Gmina Krobia, within Gostyń County, Greater Poland Voivodeship, in west-central Poland.

== History ==
The area formed part of Poland since the establishment of the state in the 10th century. Kuczyna was a private village of Polish nobility, administratively located in the Kościan County in the Poznań Voivodeship in the Greater Poland Province of the Kingdom of Poland. It was annexed by Prussia in the Second Partition of Poland in 1793. It was regained by Poles in 1807 and included within the short-lived Duchy of Warsaw, and after the duchy's dissolution in 1815, the village was reannexed by Prussia, and was also part of Germany from 1871. Following World War I, Poland regained independence and control of the village.

Following the joint German-Soviet invasion of Poland, which started World War II in September 1939, the village was occupied by Germany until 1945 and local Poles were subjected to various crimes. Local landowner Mariusz Sumiński was among Poles murdered in a public execution perpetrated by the German Einsatzgruppe VI in the nearby town of Krobia on October 21, 1939, as part of the Intelligenzaktion. In 1941, the occupiers carried out expulsions of Poles, who were either deported to forced labour in Germany or enslaved as forced labour of new German colonists in the county. Houses and farms of expelled Poles were handed over to new German colonists as part of the Lebensraum policy.
