= Przyborowo, Gostyń County =

Przyborowo
- Village
- Location within Poland
- Coordinates: 51°43′N 16°55′E
- Country: Poland
- Voivodeship: Greater Poland
- County: Gostyń
- Gmina: Krobia
- Population: 137
- Time zone: UTC+1 (CET)
  - Summer (DST): UTC+2 (CEST)
- Vehicle registration: PGS

Przyborowo [pʂɨbɔˈrɔvɔ] is a village in the administrative district of Gmina Krobia, within Gostyń County, Greater Poland Voivodeship, in west-central Poland.

== History ==
The area formed part of Poland since the establishment of the state in the 10th century. Przyborowo was a private village of Polish nobility, administratively located in the Kościan County in the Poznań Voivodeship in the Greater Poland Province of the Kingdom of Poland. It was annexed by Prussia in the Second Partition of Poland in 1793. It was regained by Poles in 1807 and included within the short-lived Duchy of Warsaw, and after the duchy's dissolution in 1815, the village was reannexed by Prussia, and was also part of Germany from 1871. Following World War I, Poland regained independence and control of the village.

During the German occupation of Poland (World War II), in 1941, the occupiers carried out expulsions of Poles, who were either deported to forced labour in Germany or enslaved as forced labour of German colonists in the county. Houses and farms of expelled Poles were handed over to new German colonists as part of the Lebensraum policy.
