= Pudliszki =

- Village
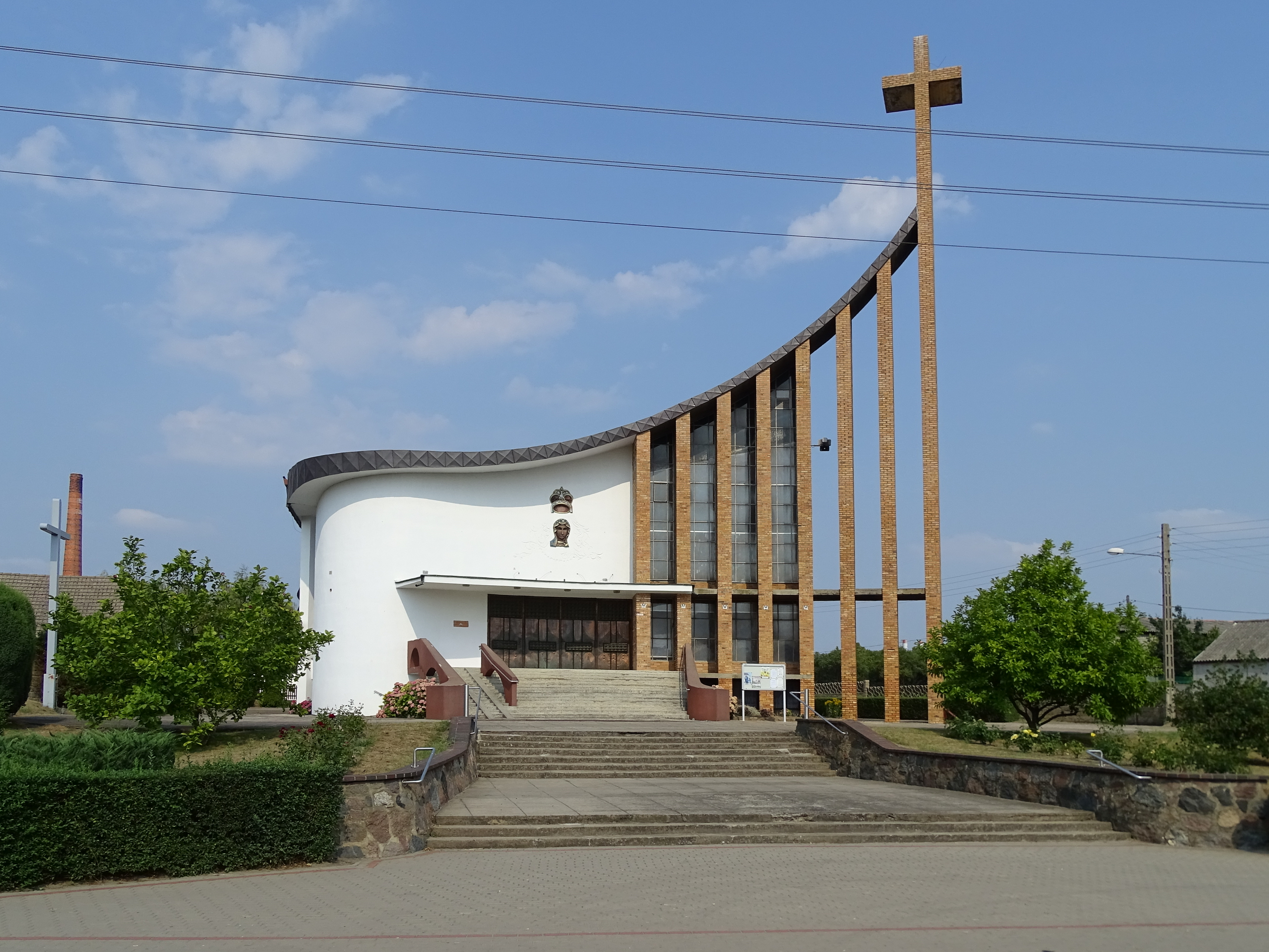
- Church of Our Lady of Częstochowa

- Location within Poland
- Coordinates: 51°46′N 16°56′E
- Country: Poland
- Voivodeship: Greater Poland
- County: Gostyń
- Gmina: Krobia
- Named for: Marcin Pudliszko

Population
  - Total: 2,360
- Time zone: UTC+1 (CET)
  - Summer (DST): UTC+2 (CEST)
- Vehicle registration: PGS

Pudliszki [puˈdliʂki] is a village in the administrative district of Gmina Krobia, within Gostyń County, Greater Poland Voivodeship, in west-central Poland.

The Pudliszki food company is based in the village.

== History ==
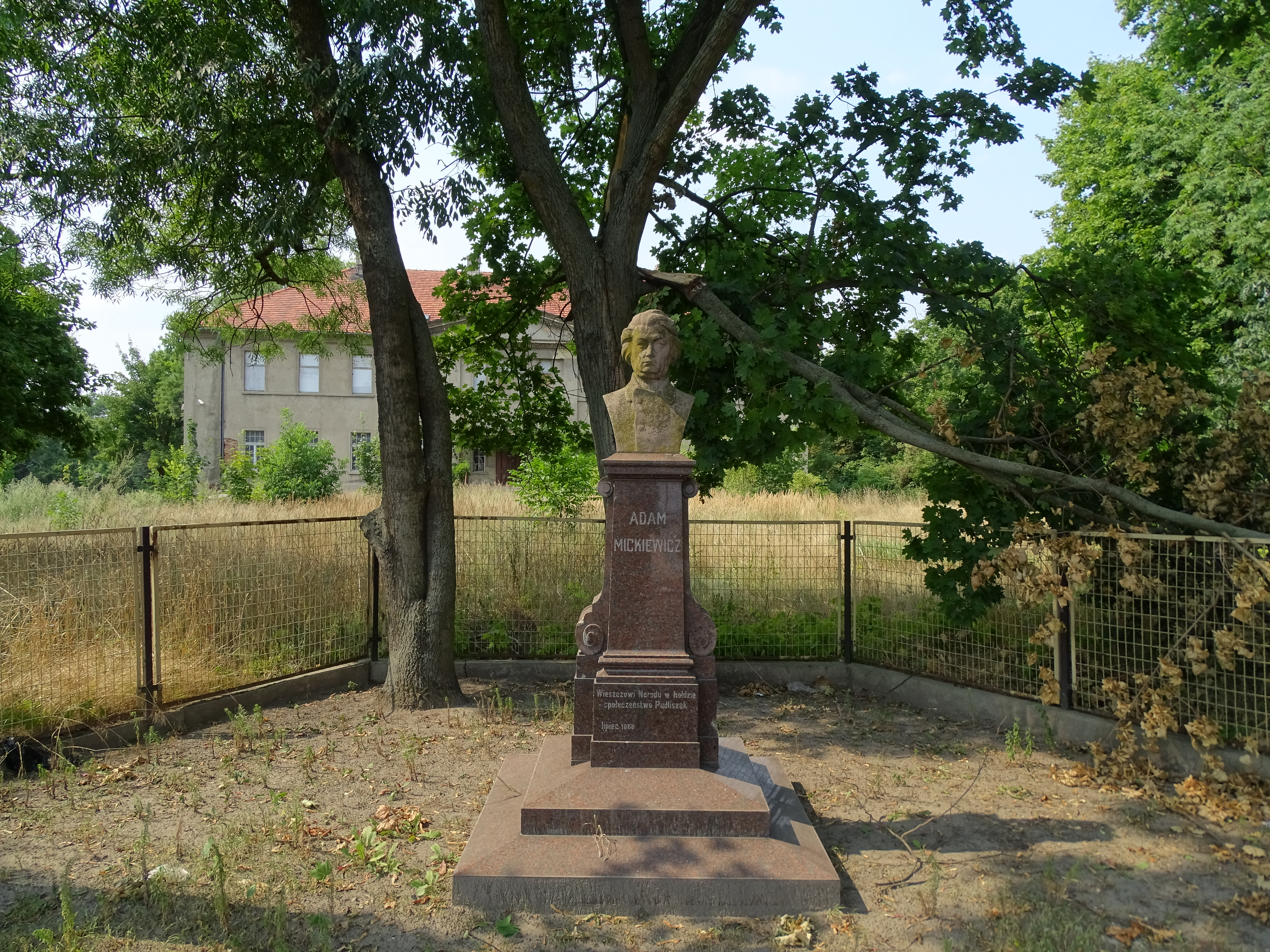
Monument to poet Adam Mickiewicz, who visited the village in 1831

Near the village, there is a prehistoric burial ground where tools from about 2400–2700 years ago were found. The area formed part of Poland since the establishment of the state in the 10th century. In the 10th century a defensive stronghold was located nearby. In the 14th century, as a reward for his war services, Polish King Władysław II Jagiełło granted knight Marcin Pudliszko the Abdank coat of arms for the territory on which the village was founded. It was named Pudliszki after its founder. Pudliszki was a private village of Polish nobility, including the Pudliszko, Gostyński, Gorzeński, Wilczyński and Morawski families, administratively located in the Kościan County in the Poznań Voivodeship in the Greater Poland Province of the Kingdom of Poland.

The village was annexed by Prussia in the Second Partition of Poland in 1793. It was regained by Poles in 1807 and included within the short-lived Duchy of Warsaw, and after the duchy's dissolution in 1815, the village was reannexed by Prussia. In 1823, Polish writer and economic activist Count Józef Łubieński, son of politician and captain Feliks Łubieński, married the heiress of Pudliszki and the village passed the Łubieński family. In Pudliszki, Józef Łubieński organized a meeting of generals Dezydery Chłapowski, Franciszek Morawski and Jan Nepomucen Umiński and poet Adam Mickiewicz to organize weapons for the Polish November Uprising in the Russian Partition of Poland. In 1842 and 1846 the Łubieński family hosted poet Cyprian Kamil Norwid in Pudliszki. Józef Łubieński began the local tradition of industrial food processing by founding a sugar refinery in 1847.

Following World War I, Poland regained independence and control of the village. In the 1920s, Stanisław Fenrych founded the Pudliszki food company in the village, which soon became the first ketchup factory in Poland. Fenrych also developed dairy production in Pudliszki and produced traditional Polish candies krówki that were exported to Czechoslovakia, France and Germany. During a visit to Fenrych's farm and enterprise, President of Poland Ignacy Mościcki called it exemplary. In the interwar period Pudliszki was also visited by cardinal and Primate of Poland August Hlond, painter Jerzy Kossak and parliamentarian and future Prime Minister of Poland in exile Stanisław Mikołajczyk. In the late 1920s, Fenrych built a narrow-gauge railroad to nearby Karzec.

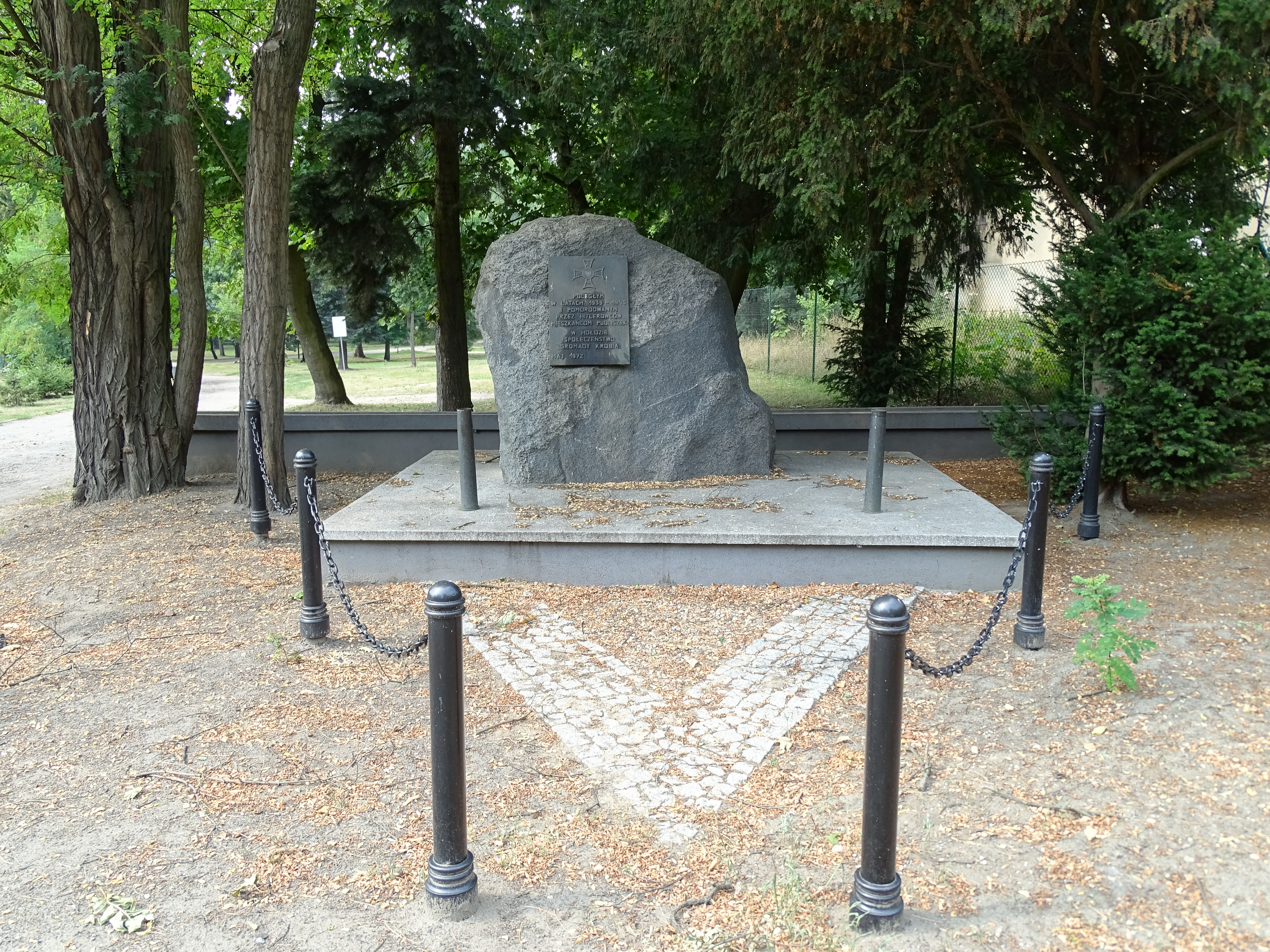
Monument to local Poles, who were murdered by the Germans during World War II

At the beginning of the German invasion of Poland, which started World War II in September 1939, Stanisław Fenrych distributed food from the factory warehouses to his employees to support them in the face of the war and to prevent it from being seized by the Germans. The factory itself was seized by the Wehrmacht. The Germans offered Fenrych to continue running the factory on condition that he would sign the Deutsche Volksliste, which he refused. In December 1939, the occupiers expelled him with his wife and brother to Tarnów in the General Government in the more eastern part of German-occupied Poland. Under German occupation, the village was renamed to Großgarten to erase traces of Polish origin. Further expulsions of Poles were carried out in 1941. Expelled Poles were either deported to forced labour in Germany or enslaved as forced labour of new German colonists in the county. Houses and farms of expelled Poles were handed over to new German colonists as part of the Lebensraum policy. After the end of German occupation in 1945, the village was restored to Poland, although with a Soviet-installed communist regime, which stayed in power until the Fall of Communism in the 1980s. Its historic name was restored. Stanisław Fenrych returned to Pudliszki and tried to regain his factory, but the communists did not allow it, and even forbade him from residing in the county, so he settled in Leszno in the neighboring county.

== Education ==
The Stanisław Fenrych Primary School is located in Pudliszki.

== Notable people ==
- Franciszek Morawski (1783–1861), Polish general, poet, translator, and playwright
