= Domachowo =

Domachowo may refer to the following places:

- Domachowo, Greater Poland Voivodeship (west-central Poland)
- Domachowo, Pomeranian Voivodeship (north Poland)
- Domachowo, West Pomeranian Voivodeship (north-west Poland)
