= Rogowo, Greater Poland Voivodeship =

Rogowo
- Village
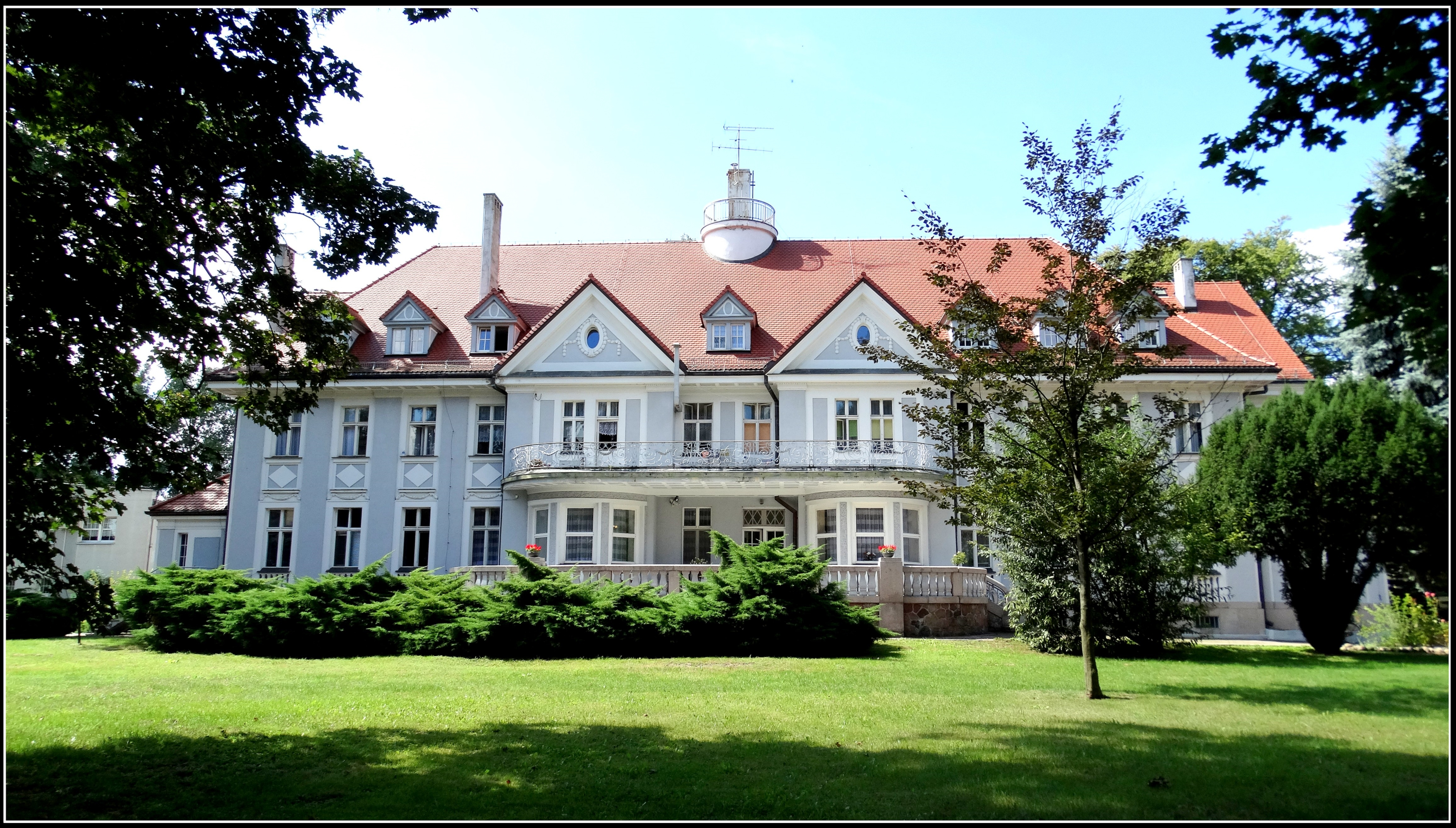
- Palace in Rogowo

- Location within Poland
- Coordinates: 51°44′N 17°0′E
- Country: Poland
- Voivodeship: Greater Poland
- County: Gostyń
- Gmina: Krobia
- First mentioned: 1407
- Population: 240
- Time zone: UTC+1 (CET)
  - Summer (DST): UTC+2 (CEST)
- Vehicle registration: PGS

Rogowo [rɔˈɡɔvɔ] is a village in the administrative district of Gmina Krobia, within Gostyń County, Greater Poland Voivodeship, in west-central Poland.

== History ==
The area formed part of Poland since the establishment of the state in the 10th century. The oldest known mention of the village comes from 1407. Rogowo was a private village of Polish nobility, administratively located in the Kościan County in the Poznań Voivodeship in the Greater Poland Province of the Kingdom of Poland. It was annexed by Prussia in the Second Partition of Poland in 1793. It was regained by Poles in 1807 and included within the short-lived Duchy of Warsaw, and after the duchy's dissolution in 1815, the village was reannexed by Prussia, and was also part of Germany from 1871. Following World War I, Poland regained independence and control of the village.

During the German occupation of Poland (World War II), in 1942, the German gendarmerie carried out expulsions of Poles, who then were either deported to the General Government in the more eastern part of German-occupied Poland or enslaved as forced labour in the county. Houses and farms of expelled Poles were handed over to new German colonists as part of the Lebensraum policy.
