= Bukownica =

Bukownica may refer to the following places:

- Bukownica, Gostyń County in Greater Poland Voivodeship (west-central Poland)
- Bukownica, Ostrzeszów County in Greater Poland Voivodeship (west-central Poland)
- Bukownica, Lublin Voivodeship (east Poland)
- Bukownica, Kuyavian Pomeranian Voivodeship
