= Pijanowice =

- Village
- Location within Poland
- Coordinates: 51°49′15″N 16°57′36″E
- Country: Poland
- Voivodeship: Greater Poland
- County: Gostyń
- Gmina: Krobia
- Population: 168

Pijanowice [pijanɔˈvit͡sɛ] is a village in the administrative district of Gmina Krobia, within Gostyń County, Greater Poland Voivodeship, in west-central Poland.
