= Dębina, Gostyń County =

Dębina
- Village
- Location within Poland
- Coordinates: 51°43′03″N 16°57′50″E
- Country: Poland
- Voivodeship: Greater Poland
- County: Gostyń
- Gmina: Krobia

Dębina [dɛmˈbina] is a village in the administrative district of Gmina Krobia, within Gostyń County, Greater Poland Voivodeship, in west-central Poland.
