= Franciszek Morawski =

Polish poet (1783–1861)

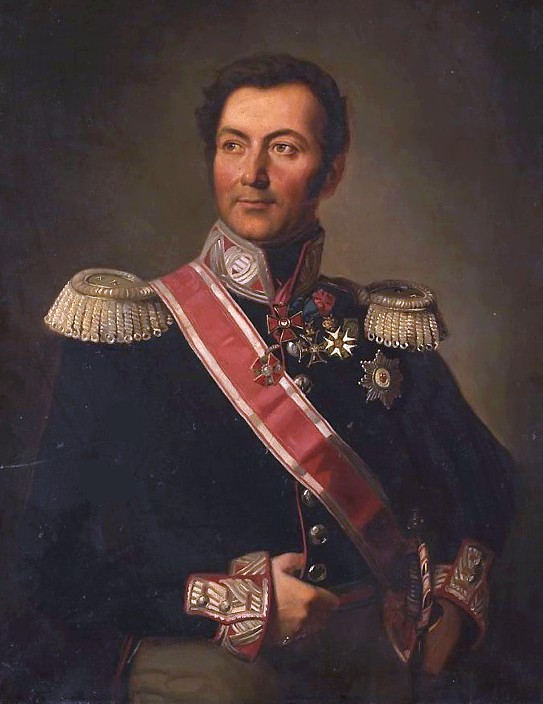
- Born: 2 April 1783; Pudliszki, Poland
- Died: 12 December 1861 (aged 78); Lubonia, Poland
- Military career
- Service years: 1806–31
- Rank: Divisional general
- Conflicts: November Uprising; Napoleonic Wars
- Awards: Gold Cross of the Virtuti Militari; Cross of the Knight of the Legion of honor; Cross of the Knight of Virtuti Militari; Cross of the officer of the Legion of honor; Order of Saint Stanislaus; Order of Saint Vladimir; Order of Saint Anna

Franciszek Dzierżykraj Morawski (2 April 1783 – 12 December 1861) was a divisional general in the Polish army, a minister of war during the November Uprising, poet, literary critic, translator, and playwright.

== Life ==
Franciszek Morawski was the son of Wojciech Morawski and Zofia Szczaniecka. He began his education in the family home, before continuing his studies in nearby Leszno and later still in Frankfurt, where he studied law. He worked for a time in the court in Frankfurt, and later became an assessor in Kalisz.

In 1820 Morawski married Aniela Wierzchowska. The couple had two children: Tadeusz (1821–1888) et Anna Maria (1822–1891).

Franciszek Morawski died 12 December 1861.

== Military career ==
In November 1806, Morawski enlisted in Napoleon's honor guard in Poznań. He served as second lieutenant in 1st infantry regiment. The following year he fought at the Battle of Tczew, during which he was promoted to lieutenant. He fought in the Siege of Danzig and became captain. That same year, after the Siege of Kolberg in 1807, Morawski was decorated with the Knights' cross of the Virtuti Militari.

During the War of the Fifth Coalition he was aide de camp to general Stanisław Fiszer. Morawski commanded the 16th infantry division during the French Invasion of Russia. On 8 October 1812 he was promoted to colonel. Following Napoleon's eventual defeat, Morawski was dispatched to Denmark to find Polish prisoners of war.

From 5 February 1815 he served in the army of Congress Poland. Between 1820 and 1826, he commanded the 3rd brigade of the 2nd infantry division at Zamość. He was decorated with the Order of Saint Stanislaus by Nicholas I of Russia

At the outbreak of the November Uprising, Morawski found himself in Lublin. On 30 January 1831, he was named intendant general of the insurrectional army, and later became minister of war. He decommissioned on 11 September 1831 in protest against the negotiations being undertaken with Russia.

== Literary activity ==
In 1833, Morawski retired to Lubonia and devoted himself to literary pursuits. He belonged to the Towarzystwo Iksów (1815–1819) and both the Warsaw and Poznań Societies of Friends of Learning. He took part in literary evenings organized by Wincenty Krasiński, and often visited Izabela and Adam Kazimierz Czartoryski at their palace in Puławy.

Morawski wrote poetry and plays, as well as fables. He was a prolific literary and theater critic, and feuilletonist. He translated various works, including those of Racine, Shakespeare, Byron.

== Selected works ==
- Oda na powrót wojska. 1812.
- Sen poety. Scena liryczna. Warsaw, 1818.
- Wisła i zima. Warsaw, before 1834.
- Życie Kajetana Koźmiana. Poznań, 1856.

== Bibliography ==
- Bibliografia Literatury Polskiej – Nowy Korbut, vol. 5: Oświecenie, 339–45. Warsaw: Państwowy Instytut Wydawniczy, 1967.
- Bielecki, R. Słownik biograficzny oficerów powstania listopadowego, vol. 2. Warsaw, 1995.
- Filipow, K. "Ordery gen. Franciszka Dzierżykraj-Morawskiego w zbiorach Muzeum Narodowego w Szczecinie." In Najnowsze badania nad numizmatyką i sfragistyką Pomorza Zachodniego. Materiały z konferencji naukowej 50 lat Działu Numizmatycznego Muzeum Narodowego w Szczecinie 19-20 września 2002 roku, edited by Horoszko, 247–253. Szczecin: Biblioteka Naukowa Muzeum Narodowego w Szczecinie. Historia i Kultura Materialna, 2004.
- Horoszko, G. "Pięćdziesięciolecie Działu Numizmatycznego w Muzeum Narodowym w Szczecinie." In Najnowsze badania nad numizmatyką i sfragistyką Pomorza Zachodniego, 15–23.
- Kosk, H.P. Generalicja Polska, vol. 2: M-Z. Pruszków, 2001.
