= Gmina Krobia =

Gmina Krobia Krobia Commune
- Gmina
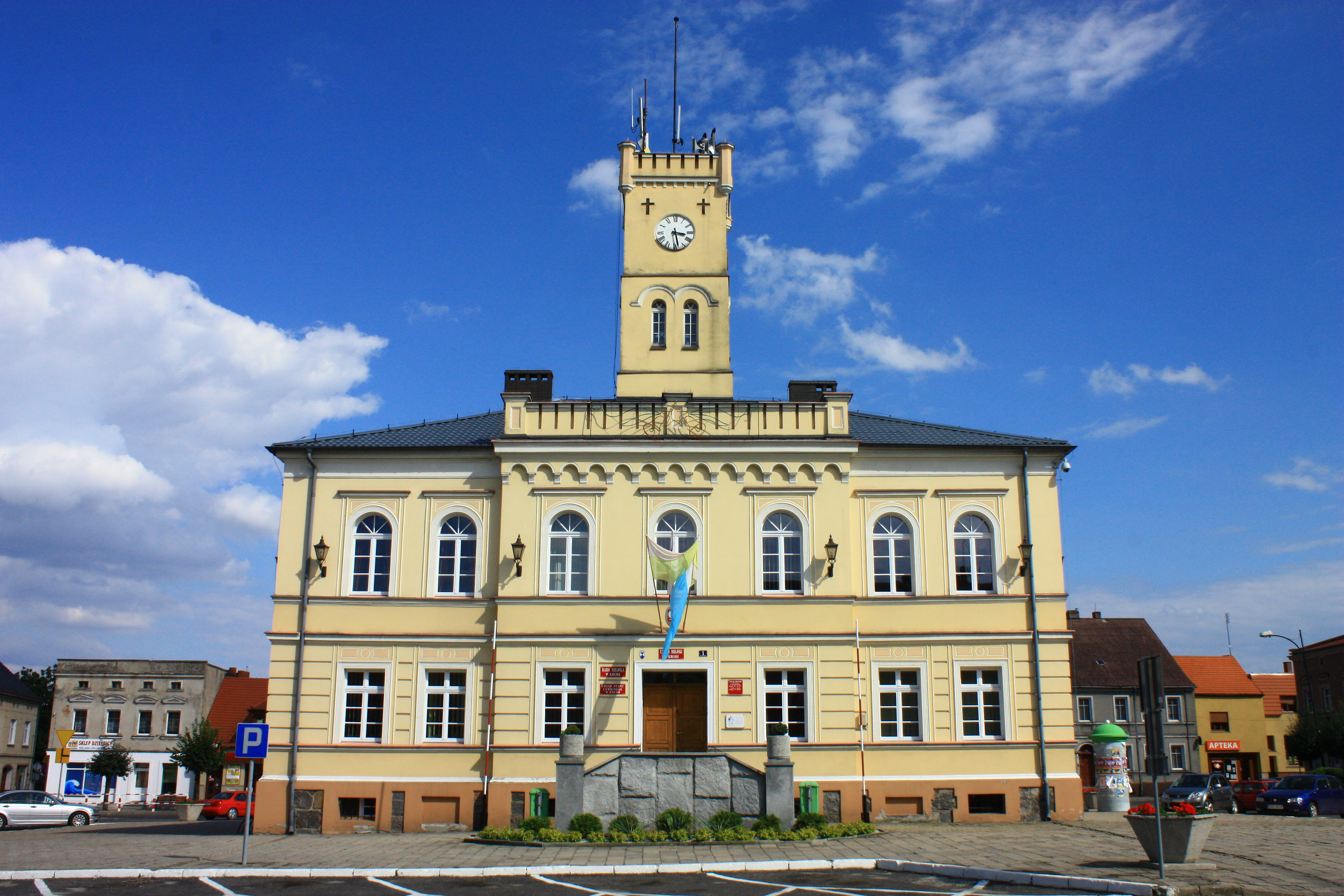
- Town Hall in Krobia, seat of the gmina office

- Coat of arms
- Interactive map of Gmina Krobia
- Coordinates (Krobia): 51°47′N 16°59′E
- Country: Poland
- Voivodeship: Greater Poland
- County: Gostyń
- Seat: Krobia

Area
  - Total: 129.59 km^{2} (50.03 sq mi)

Population (2006)
  - Total: 12,792
  - Density: 98.711/km^{2} (255.66/sq mi)
  - Urban: 4,022
  - Rural: 8,770
- Time zone: UTC+1 (CET)
  - Summer (DST): UTC+2 (CEST)
- Website: http://www.krobia.com.pl/

Gmina Krobia is an urban-rural gmina (administrative district) in Gostyń County, Greater Poland Voivodeship, in west-central Poland. Its seat is the town of Krobia, which lies approximately 11 kilometres (7 mi) south of Gostyń and 69 km (43 mi) south of the regional capital Poznań.

The gmina covers an area of 129.59 square kilometres (50.0 sq mi), and as of 2006 its total population is 12,792 (out of which the population of Krobia amounts to 4,022, and the population of the rural part of the gmina is 8,770).

== Villages ==
Apart from the town of Krobia, Gmina Krobia contains the villages and settlements of Bukownica, Chumiętki, Chwałkowo, Ciołkowo, Dębina, Domachowo, Florynki, Gogolewo, Grabianowo, Karzec, Kuczyna, Kuczynka, Niepart, Pijanowice, Posadowo, Potarzyca, Przyborowo, Pudliszki, Rogowo, Stara Krobia, Sułkowice, Wymysłowo, Ziemlin and Żychlewo.

== Neighbouring gminas ==
Gmina Krobia is bordered by the gminas of Gostyń, Miejska Górka, Pępowo, Piaski and Poniec.
