= Domachowo, Greater Poland Voivodeship =

Domachowo
- Village
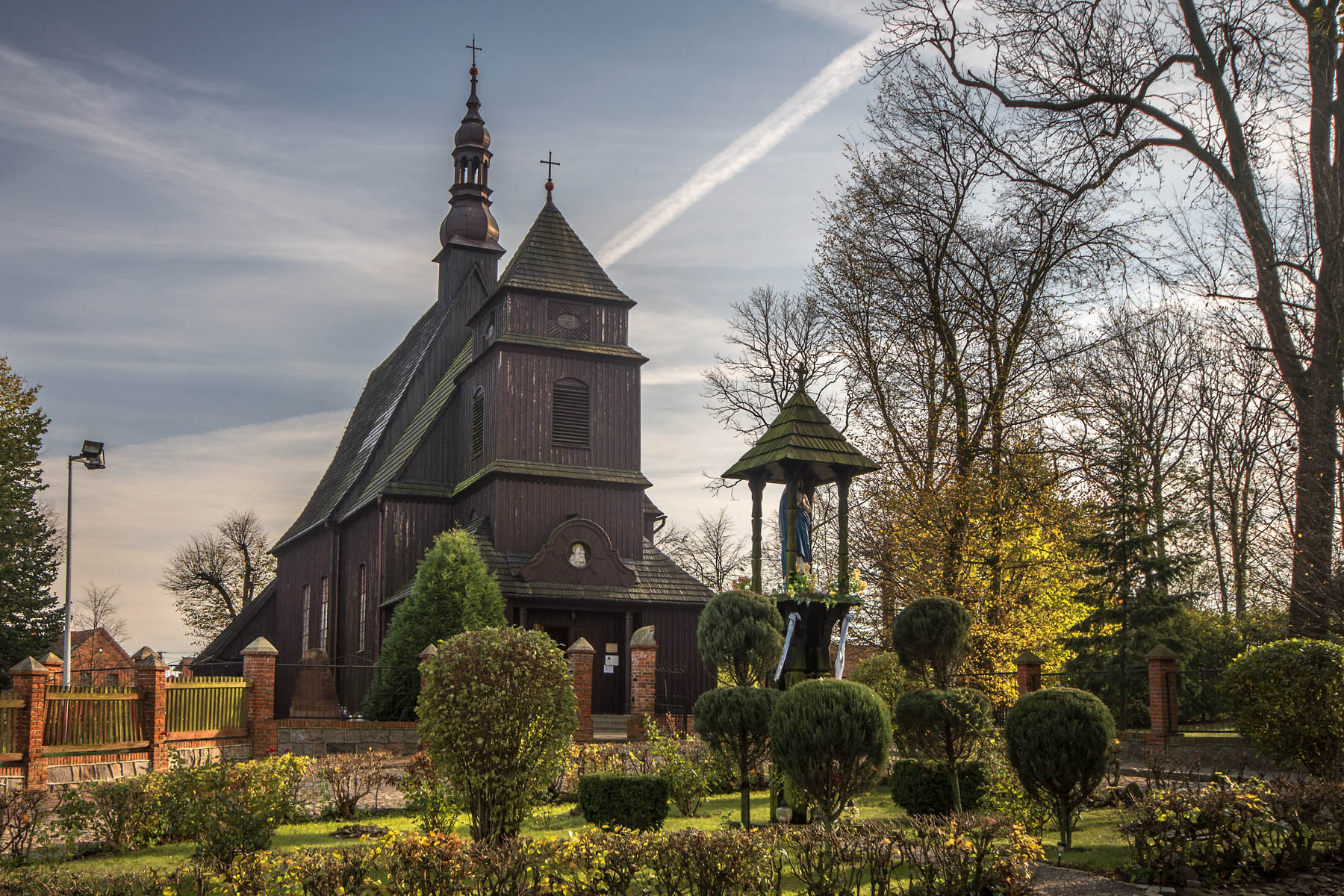
- Saint Michael Archangel church in Domachowo

- Location within Poland
- Coordinates: 51°48′53″N 17°3′6″E
- Country: Poland
- Voivodeship: Greater Poland
- County: Gostyń
- Gmina: Krobia
- Population: 472
- Time zone: UTC+1 (CET)
  - Summer (DST): UTC+2 (CEST)
- Vehicle registration: PGS

Domachowo [dɔmaˈxɔvɔ] is a village in the administrative district of Gmina Krobia, within Gostyń County, Greater Poland Voivodeship, in west-central Poland.

== History ==
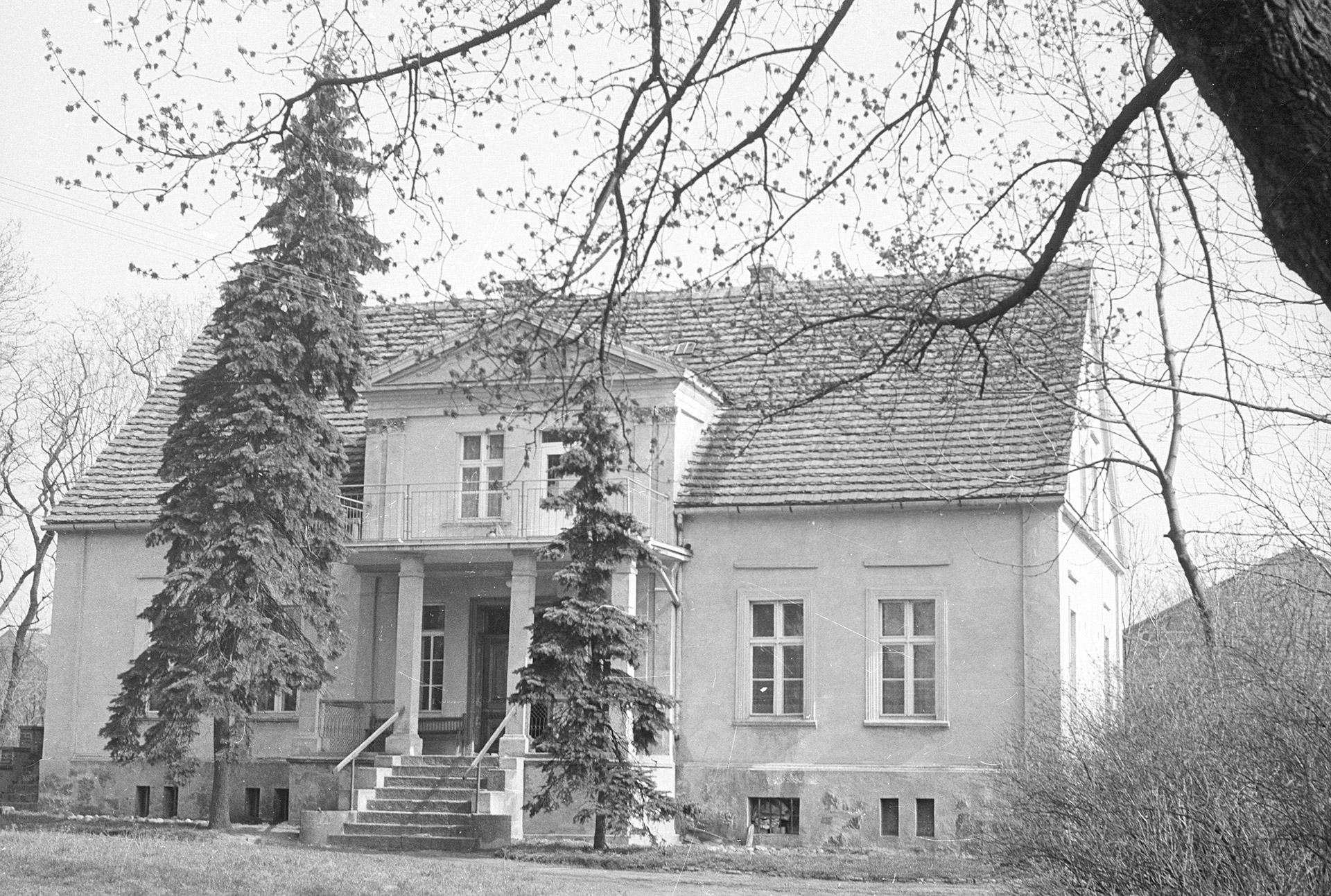
Local historic manor house in the 1970s

The area formed part of Poland since the establishment of the state in the 10th century. Domachowo was a private church village, administratively located in the Kościan County in the Poznań Voivodeship in the Greater Poland Province of the Kingdom of Poland. The local landmark Church of Saint Michael Archangel was built in the 16th century. It was annexed by Prussia in the Second Partition of Poland in 1793. It was regained by Poles in 1807 and included within the short-lived Duchy of Warsaw, and after the duchy's dissolution in 1815, the village was reannexed by Prussia, and was also part of Germany from 1871. Following World War I, Poland regained independence and control of the village.

During the German occupation of Poland (World War II), in December 1939, the occupiers carried out first expulsions of Poles, who were then sent to a transit camp in nearby Gostyń, and eventually deported to the General Government in the more eastern part of German-occupied Poland. Further expulsions of Poles were carried out by the German gendarmerie in 1940. Expelled Poles were either deported to forced labour in Germany or enslaved as forced labour of new German colonists in the county. Houses and farms of expelled Poles were handed over to new German colonists as part of the Lebensraum policy.
