= Pudliszki (company) =

Polish food producer

- Type: Sp. z o.o.
- Industry: Food
- Founded: 1920; 106 years ago
- Headquarters: Pudliszki, Poland
- Area served: Poland
- Key people: Adam Juliusz Dyszyński
- Products: Fruit and vegetables
- Revenue: zl 543,500 (2012)
- Number of employees: 655 (2012)
- Website: www.pudliszki.pl

Pudliszki Sp. z o.o. is Polish brand and producer in the food industry of fruit and vegetables. The brand is a subsidiary of the American company Heinz, which holds the majority of shares in the company. Pudliszki focuses on the production of tomato goods (ketchup and concentrate) and vegetables (peas, beans and corn).

== History ==
The beginning of the production plant in Pudliszki was with Józef Łubieński, who in 1847 opened one of the first sugar refineries in Greater Poland. The proceeding owner, Kennemann, liquidated the sugar refinery and opened up the more profitable distillery. In 1923, owner Stanisław Fenrych opened up a new production plant with around 200 employees. In 1927, the company financed the research of two professors from Poznań in London to study the technology of ketchup production. This research allowed Pudliszki to begin producing its own tomato goods. Although in the midst of the Great Depression, the company numbered 800 employees in the nineteenth-thirties, exporting to Germany, France and the United States. After the Second World War, the company was nationalised and specialised in the food industry. By 1992 and 1993, the company held its place in the five-hundred most prosperous state-owned enterprises. In 1994, the company was transformed into a joint-stock company. Since 1997, most of its shares are held by Heinz.
