= Krobia =

Town in Greater Poland Voivodeship, Poland

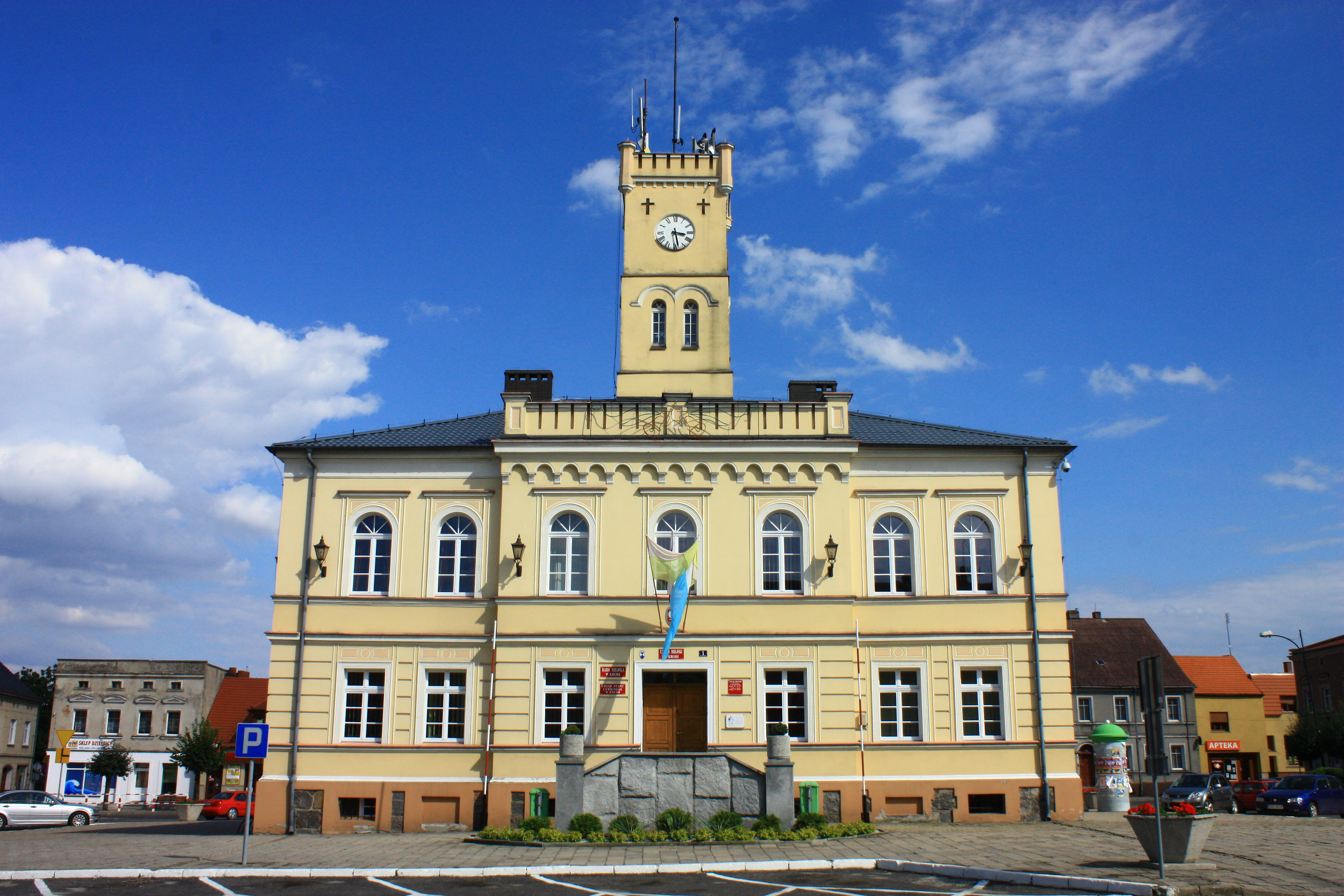
- Town hall

- Coat of arms

- Location within Poland
- Coordinates: 51°47′N 16°59′E
- Country: Poland
- Voivodeship: Greater Poland
- County: Gostyń
- Gmina: Krobia

Area
  - Total: 7.05 km^{2} (2.72 sq mi)

Population (2012)
  - Total: 4,219
  - Density: 598/km^{2} (1,550/sq mi)
- Time zone: UTC+1 (CET)
  - Summer (DST): UTC+2 (CEST)
- Postal code: 63-840
- Vehicle registration: PGS
- Website: http://www.krobia.pl

Krobia [ˈkrɔbʲa] is a town in western Poland, in Gostyń County, Greater Poland Voivodeship. It is the center of the small folklore region of Biskupizna.

== History ==
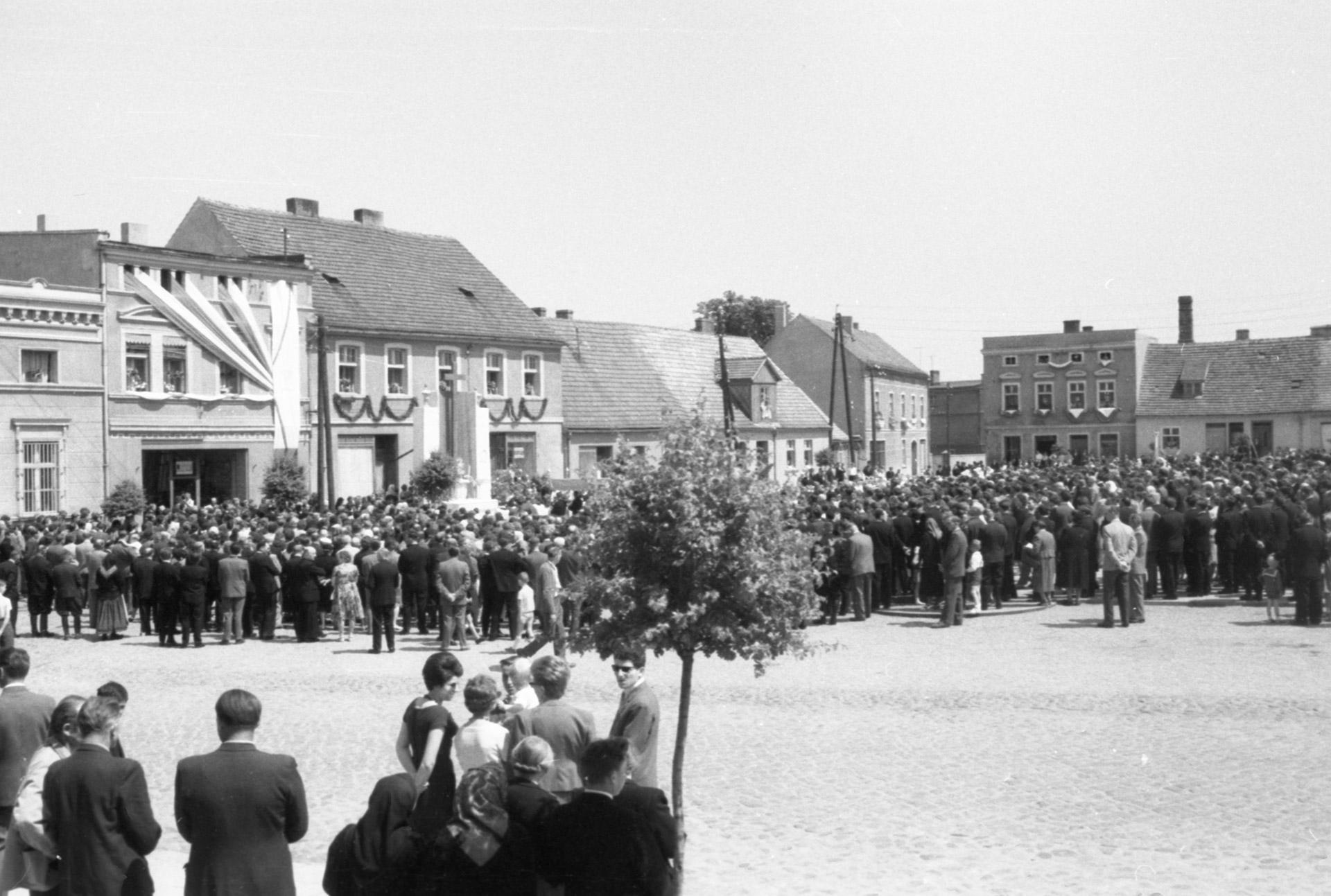
Corpus Christi solemnity in Krobia in 1964

Within the Kingdom of Poland, Krobia was a private church town, administratively located in the Kościan County in the Poznań Voivodeship in the Greater Poland Province.

Following the joint German-Soviet invasion of Poland, which started World War II in September 1939, the town was occupied by Germany until 1945 and local Poles were subjected to various crimes. On October 21, 1939, the German Einsatzgruppe VI carried out a public execution of 15 Poles at the main square as part of the Intelligenzaktion. The victims were craftsmen and local officials from Krobia and farmers and landowners from nearby villages. It was one of many massacres of Poles committed by Germany on October 20–23 across the region in attempt to pacify and terrorize the Polish population. In December 1939, the first expulsion of 50 Poles (teachers, local officials and craftsmen with families) was carried out by the German police. Further expulsions were carried out in 1940. Expelled Poles were detained in transit camps in Gostyń and Łódź and then deported to Tarnów and the Lublin region in the General Government in the more-eastern part of German-occupied, while their houses were handed over to German colonists as part of the Lebensraum policy. Several Poles who were either born or lived and worked in Krobia were murdered by the Russians in the Katyn massacre in 1940.

== Demographics ==
Historical population

Year	Pop.	±%
1843	1,365	—
1871	1,596	+16.9%
1880	1,695	+6.2%
1890	1,847	+9.0%
1900	2,186	+18.4%
1910	2,384	+9.1%

Year	Pop.	±%
1921	2,285	−4.2%
1931	2,384	+4.3%
1939	2,900	+21.6%
1950	2,451	−15.5%
1960	2,769	+13.0%
2010	4,089	+47.7%

== Sights ==
- Romanesque St. Giles church from the beginning of 12th century (consecrated in 1140), founded by Władysław I Herman, one of the oldest churches in Greater Poland
- Baroque St. Nicholas Church from 1763, tower rebuilt in 1986 after collapse
- Baroque Holy Spirit Church from 1745
- Town hall from the middle of 19th century
- old evangelical school

== Transport ==
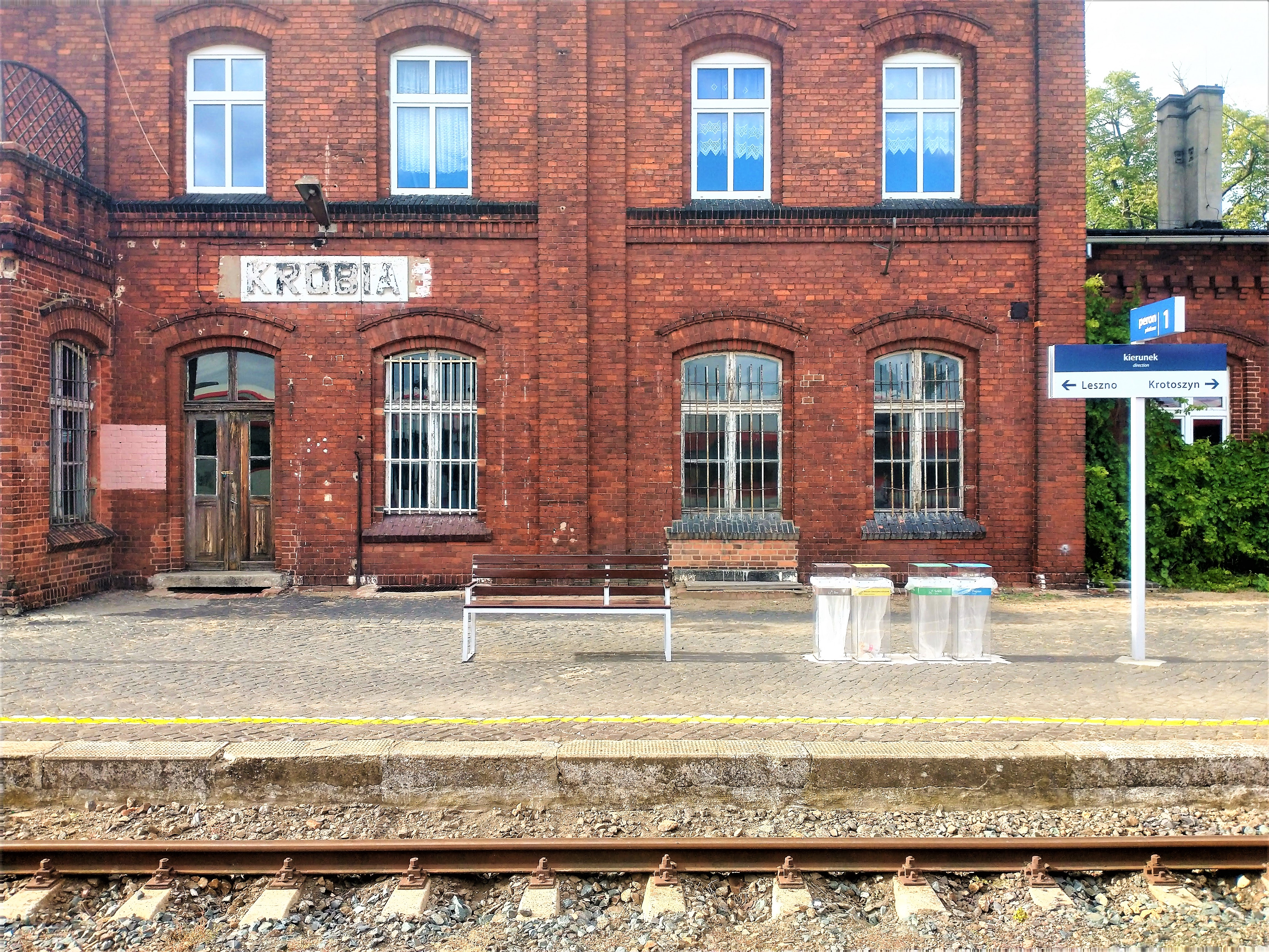
Railway station

Voivodeship road 434 bypasses Krobia to the west connecting it to Gostyń to the north and to Rawicz to the south.

Krobia has a station on the Leszno-Krotoszyn railway line.

== Sports ==
The local football club is Krobianka Krobia. It competes in the lower leagues.
