= Killion Munyama =

Zambian-born Polish economist and politician

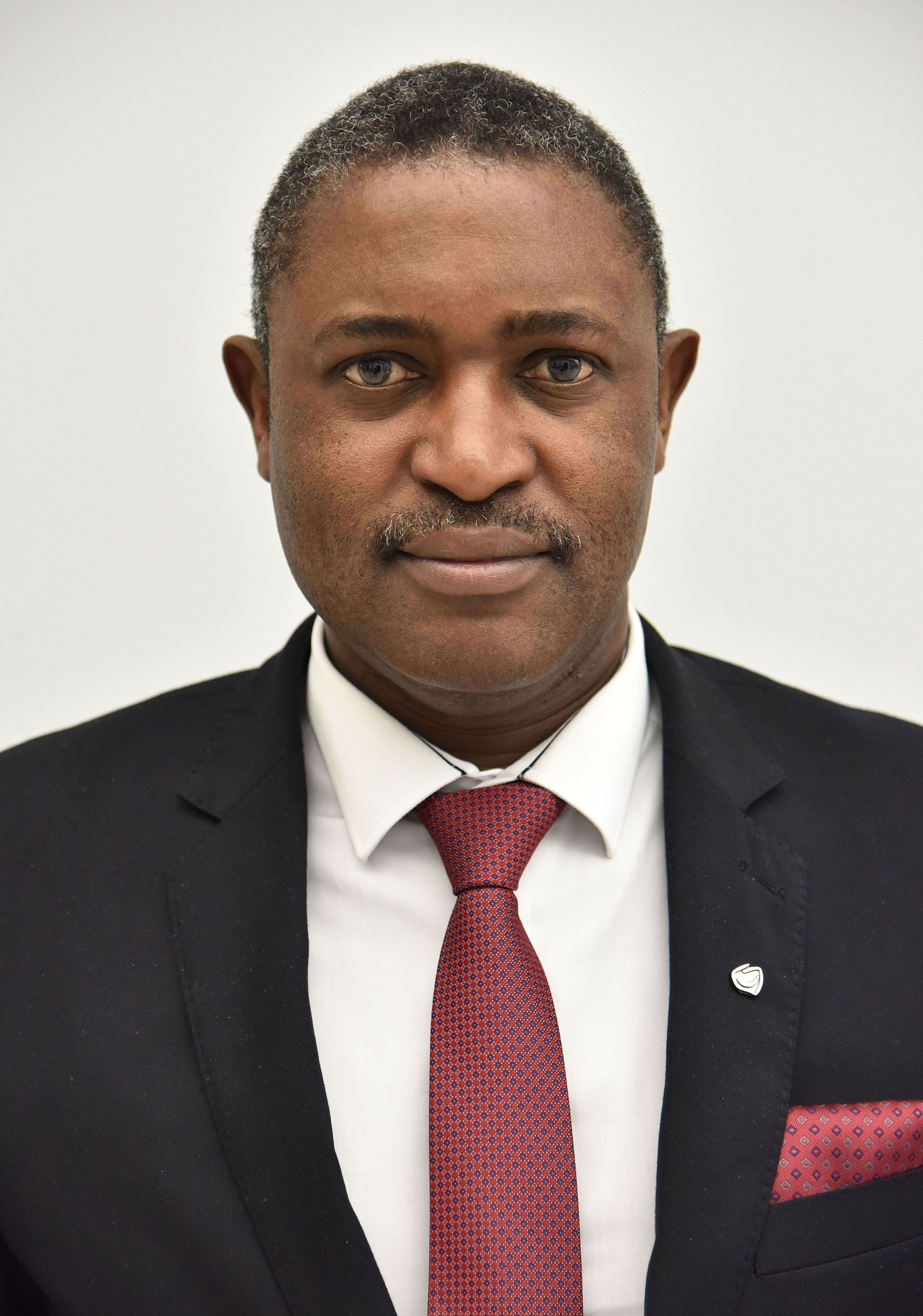
- Munyama in 2016

Member of the Sejm
- In office 9 October 2011 – 10 June 2021

Personal details
- Born: Killion Munzele Munyama; 10 July 1961 (age 65) Monze, Federation of Rhodesia and Nyasaland (now Zambia)
- Party: Civic Platform
- Spouse: Elżbieta Munyama
- Education: Poznań University of Economics
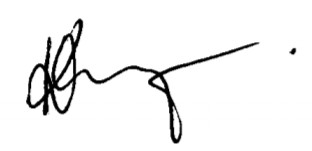
- Signature

Killion Munzele Munyama (born 10 July 1961) is a Polish economist, academic lecturer and politician of the Civic Platform (PO) who served as a member of the Polish Parliament from 2011 until 2021.

== Early life and education ==
Munyama was born in Monze, Zambia. Later his family moved to Mumbwa and then to Mkushi where Munyama grew up on a farm. He came to Poland on a scholarship in 1981 to study International Finance. Munyama has stated that initially he planned on returning to Zambia after graduation, as he saw no opportunities for academics in communist Poland. However, after the fall of Communism in Poland, he changed his mind as he saw an opportunity for improvement and a "chance to rid (the country) of the grey reality of communism".

== Career in academia ==
Munyama graduated from the Poznań University of Economics in 1987. After graduation he worked for the Zambian government and then returned to Poland in 1994. He obtained his PhD from the Poznań University of Economics in 1994, with a dissertation "IMF Conditionality and the Problem of Structural Adjustment in the Zambian Economy". In 2012 he habilitated, based on his work "Economic Growth and Financial Development in Sub-Saharan African Countries: The Case of IMF Programmes in Kenya, Mozambique, Uganda and Zambia" (Wzrost gospodarczy a rozwój finansowy w Afryce Subsaharyjskiej na przykładzie programów MFW w Kenii, Mozambiku, Ugandzie i Zambii).

Munyama's fields of specialisation are banking and international finance. He has been working at the Poznań University of Economics since obtaining his doctorate and has also taught at the Bydgoszcz Higher School of Economics.

== Political career ==
In the 2002 elections Munyama was elected as a delegate to the local council of Grodzisk County. In 2006 he joined the Civic Platform centre-right party and was elected to the Greater Poland Regional Assembly.

In the 2011 elections Munyama was elected to the Sejm.

In addition to his role in parliament, Munyama has been serving as member of the Italian delegation to the Parliamentary Assembly of the Council of Europe (PACE) since 2015. As part of the European People's Party group, he is member of the Committee on Migration, Refugees and Displaced Persons (since 2015) and the Sub-Committee on Diasporas and Integration (since 2020). In this capacity, he is the coordinator of PACE’s Parliamentary Network on Diaspora Policies and served as the Assembly's rapporteur on the humanitarian needs and rights of internally displaced persons in Europe in 2018. From 2015 until 2017, he also served on the Sub-Committee on Integration.

He resigned from the Sejm on 10 June 2021, after he agreed to work for the European External Action Service.

== Political positions ==
Munyama describes his views as liberal and pro-market. As a Sejm deputy he has worked on issues of government finance and foreign policy.

In 2018, Munyama joined other black elected representatives and community leaders from across Europe in signing an open letter supporting Italian politician Cécile Kyenge who had been sued for defamation for calling the Italian League party racist.

== Personal life ==
Munyama is married to Elżbieta, a native of Grodzisk county. They have three children and reside in Karczewo. Munyama is a supporter of the Lech Poznań and the local Dyskobolia Grodzisk Wielkopolski football clubs.
