= Rataje =

Rataje may refer to places:

== Czech Republic ==
- Rataje (Benešov District), a municipality and village in the Central Bohemian Region
- Rataje (Kroměříž District), a municipality and village in the Zlín Region
- Rataje (Tábor District), a municipality and village in the South Bohemian Region
- Rataje, a village and part of Těšetice (Olomouc District) in the Olomouc Region
- Rataje nad Sázavou, a market town in the Central Bohemian Region

== Poland ==
- Rataje, Poznań, a large residential area in Poznań
- Rataje, Chodzież County in Greater Poland Voivodeship (west-central Poland)
- Rataje, Gmina Rakoniewice, Grodzisk County in Greater Poland Voivodeship (west-central Poland)
- Rataje, Piła County in Greater Poland Voivodeship (west-central Poland)
- Rataje, Września County in Greater Poland Voivodeship (west-central Poland)
- Rataje, Lower Silesian Voivodeship (south-west Poland)
- Rataje, Masovian Voivodeship (east-central Poland)
- Rataje, Świętokrzyskie Voivodeship (south-central Poland)
- Rataje, West Pomeranian Voivodeship (north-west Poland)

== Serbia ==
- Rataje (Vranje), in southern Serbia

== See also ==
- Rataj (disambiguation)
