= Sworzyce, Greater Poland Voivodeship =

Sworzyce
- Village
- Location within Poland
- Coordinates: 52°16′1″N 16°15′48″E
- Country: Poland
- Voivodeship: Greater Poland
- County: Grodzisk
- Gmina: Grodzisk Wielkopolski
- Population: 154

Sworzyce [sfɔˈʐɨt͡sɛ] is a village in the administrative district of Gmina Grodzisk Wielkopolski, within Grodzisk County, Greater Poland Voivodeship, in west-central Poland.
