= Józefin, Greater Poland Voivodeship =

Józefin
- Village
- Location within Poland
- Coordinates: 52°9′5″N 16°14′27″E
- Country: Poland
- Voivodeship: Greater Poland
- County: Grodzisk
- Gmina: Rakoniewice

Józefin [juˈzɛfin] is a village in the administrative district of Gmina Rakoniewice, within Grodzisk County, Greater Poland Voivodeship, in west-central Poland.
