= Jabłoński =

Jabłoński (Polish pronunciation: [jaˈbwɔɲski]; feminine: Jabłońska; plural: Jabłońscy) is a Polish surname derived from the noun jabłoń (apple tree). It appears in various forms when transliterated from Cyrillic alphabets.

Language	Masculine	Feminine
Polish	Jabłoński	Jabłońska
Lithuanian	Jablonskas/Jablonskis	Jablonskienė (married), Jablonskaitė/Jablonskytė (maiden)
Belarusian (Romanization)	Яблонскі (Jablonski, Yablonski, Iablonski)	Яблонская (Jablonskaja, Yablonskaya, Iablonskaia)
Russian (Romanization)	Яблонский (Yablonsky, Yablonskiy, Iablonski, Jablonskij)	Яблонская (Yablonskaya, Yablonskaia, Iablonskaia, Jablonskaja)
Ukrainian (Romanization)	Яблонський (Yablonskyi, Yablonskyy, Jablonskyj)	Яблонська (Yablonska, Iablonska, Jablonska)

== People ==
- Aleksander Jabłoński (1898–1980), Polish physicist
- Benedict Jablonski (1917–2003), science fiction fan and booster
- Carl Gustav Jablonsky (1756–1787), Berlin naturalist, entomologist and illustrator
- Constance Jablonski (born 1990), French fashion model
- Daniel Ernst Jablonski (1660–1741), German theologian and reformer
- Dariusz Jabłoński (born 1961), Polish film director and producer
- David Jablonski (born 1953), American professor of geophysical sciences
- Edward Jablonski (1923–2004), American author
- Edward Jabłoński (1919–1970), Polish football player
- Elżbieta Jabłońska (born 1970), Polish multidisciplinary visual artist
- Grigoriy Yablonsky (born 1940), Russian chemist
- Hanna Yablonska (1981–2011), Ukrainian playwright and poet
- Henryk Jabłoński (1909–2003), Polish socialist and communist politician, historian and professor
- Jacquelyn Jablonski (born 1992), American fashion model
- Jonas Jablonskis (1860–1930), Lithuanian linguist who standardized the Lithuanian language
- Jeremy Yablonski (born 1980), a Canadian ice hockey left winger who currently plays for the Binghamton Senators in the AHL
- Johann Theodor Jablonski (1654–1731), German lexicographer
- Joseph Yablonski (1910–1969), American labor leader who was murdered in 1969 by assassins hired by a union political opponent
- Karol Jabłoński (born 1962), Polish regatta helmsman, skipper, ice sailor
- Mary Anne Jablonski (born c. 1952), Canadian politician from Alberta
- Mirosław Jabłoński, Polish football manager
- Nina Jablonski (born 1953), American anthropologist and science writer
- Oxana Yablonskaya (born 1938), Russian pianist
- Pat Jablonski (born 1967), American ice hockey player
- Phillip Carl Jablonski (1946–2019), American serial killer from California
- Ray Jablonski (1926–1985), American third baseman in Major League Baseball played third base
- Peter Jablonski (born 1971), Swedish pianist
- Sergey Yablonsky (1924–1998), a Soviet and Russian mathematician
- Stefania Jabłońska (1920–2017), Polish physician
- Steve Jablonsky (born 1970), American music composer for film and television
- Sven Jablonski (born 1990), German football referee
- Tetyana Yablonska (1917–2005), Ukrainian painter
- Tomasz Jabłoński (born 1988), Polish boxer
- Vinnie Yablonski (1923–2008), American football player
- Wanda Jablonski (1920–1992), journalist who covered the oil and petroleum industries
- Sofia Yablonska (1907–1971), travel writer
- Władysław Jabłoński (1872–1952), Polish architect and politician

== Fictional characters ==
- Bubbles Yablonsky
- Cliff Yablonski
- Daphne Jablonski, character in the television series Party of Five, played by Jennifer Aspen

== Other ==
- Jablonski diagram, diagram that illustrates the electronic states of a molecule and the transitions between them
- Jablonski by Pahls v. United States, a landmark court case that helped to define the ethical duties of mental health professionals with respect to potentially violent individuals.
- Wola Jabłońska, village in west-central Poland
