= Zdrój, Greater Poland Voivodeship =

Zdrój
- Village
- Location within Poland
- Coordinates: 52°14′N 16°21′E
- Country: Poland
- Voivodeship: Greater Poland
- County: Grodzisk
- Gmina: Grodzisk Wielkopolski
- Population: 291

Zdrój [zdrui̯] is a village in the administrative district of Gmina Grodzisk Wielkopolski, within Grodzisk County, Greater Poland Voivodeship, in west-central Poland.
