= Czarna Wieś =

Czarna Wieś (meaning "black village") may refer to the following places in Poland:

- Czarna Wieś, Greater Poland Voivodeship (west-central Poland)
- Czarna Wieś, Masovian Voivodeship (east-central Poland)
- Czarna Wieś, Podlaskie Voivodeship (north-east Poland)
- Czarna Wieś, Silesian Voivodeship (south Poland)
- Czarna Wieś, part of the Krowodrza district of Kraków
