= Zemsko, Greater Poland Voivodeship =

Zemsko
- Village
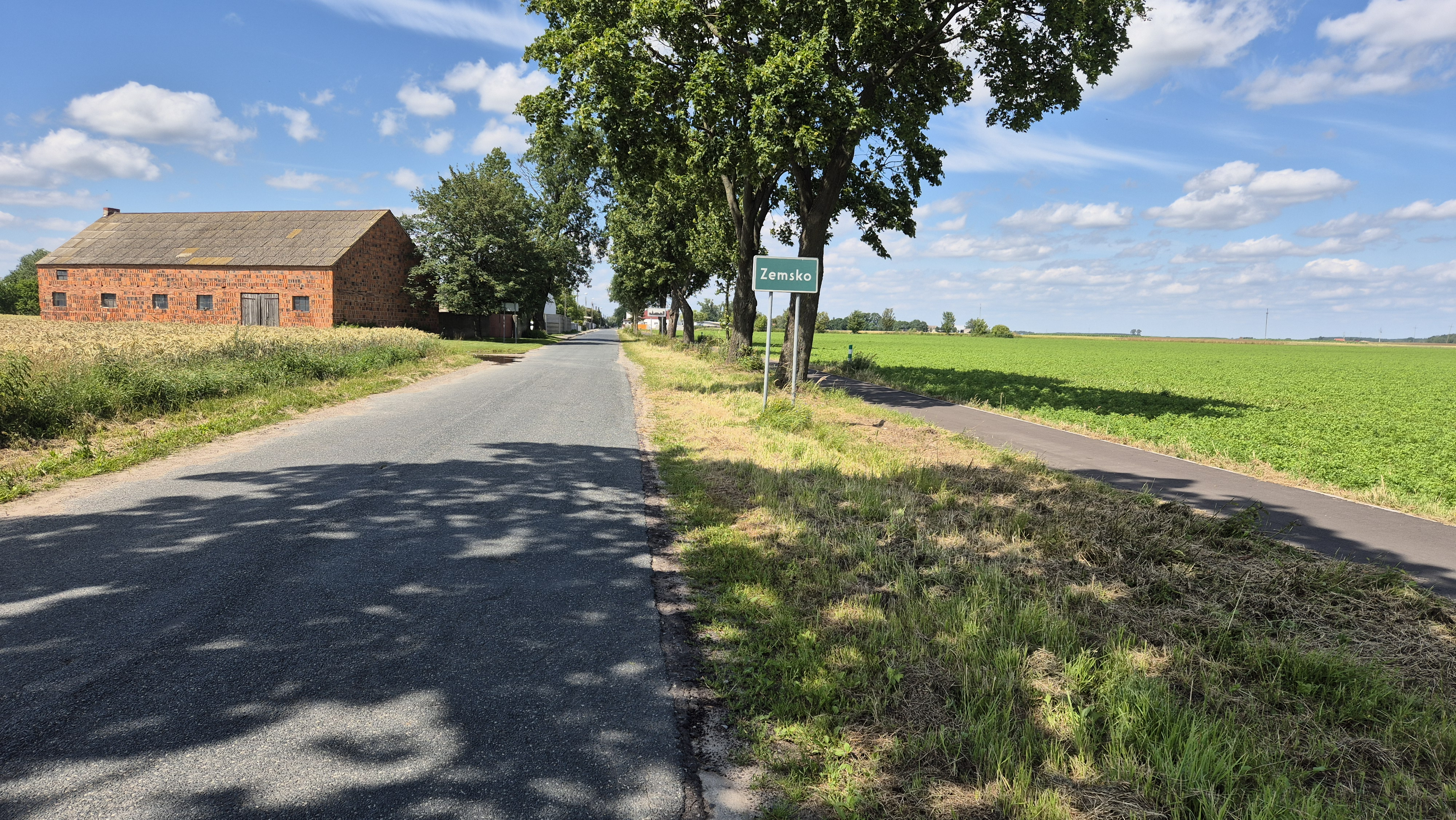

- Location within Poland
- Coordinates: 52°16′0″N 16°35′0″E
- Country: Poland
- Voivodeship: Greater Poland
- County: Grodzisk
- Gmina: Granowo

Zemsko [ˈzɛmskɔ] is a village in the administrative district of Gmina Granowo, within Grodzisk County, Greater Poland Voivodeship, in west-central Poland.
