= Parzęczewo =

- Village
- Location within Poland
- Coordinates: 52°9′N 16°26′E
- Country: Poland
- Voivodeship: Greater Poland
- County: Grodzisk
- Gmina: Kamieniec
- Population: 639

Parzęczewo [paʐɛnˈt͡ʂɛvɔ] is a village in the administrative district of Gmina Kamieniec, within Grodzisk County, Greater Poland Voivodeship, in west-central Poland.

The village has a manor house and park, currently in a state of disrepair, and a wooden church, originally built in the 18th century.
