= Grodzisk County =

Grodzisk County may refer to two counties (powiats) in Poland; in Polish they are both named powiat grodziski (which means powiat of Grodzisk):

- Grodzisk County, Greater Poland Voivodeship (west-central Poland), with county seat in Grodzisk Wielkopolski
- Grodzisk County, Masovian Voivodeship (east-central Poland), with county seat in Grodzisk Mazowiecki
