= Komorówko =

Komorówko may refer to the following places in Poland:

- Komorówko, Lower Silesian Voivodeship (south-west Poland)
- Komorówko, Greater Poland Voivodeship (west-central Poland)
- Komorówko, West Pomeranian Voivodeship (north-west Poland)
