= Kowalewo =

Kowalewo may refer to the following places:

- Kowalewo, Kuyavian-Pomeranian Voivodeship (north-central Poland)
- Kowalewo, Mława County in Masovian Voivodeship (north-central Poland)
- Kowalewo, Podlaskie Voivodeship (north-east Poland)
- Kowalewo, Płock County in Masovian Voivodeship (north-central Poland)
- Kowalewo, Chodzież County in Greater Poland Voivodeship (west-central Poland)
- Kowalewo, Gniezno County in Greater Poland Voivodeship (west-central Poland)
- Kowalewo, Gmina Kamieniec, Grodzisk County in Greater Poland Voivodeship (west-central Poland)
- Kowalewo, Lubusz Voivodeship (west Poland)
- Kowalewo, Pomeranian Voivodeship (north Poland)
- Kowalewo, Warmian-Masurian Voivodeship (north-east Poland)
- Kowalewo, West Pomeranian Voivodeship (north-west Poland)
- Kowalewo Pomorskie, Kuyavian-Pomeranian Voivodeship (north central Poland)
