= Borzysław, Greater Poland Voivodeship =

Borzysław
- Village
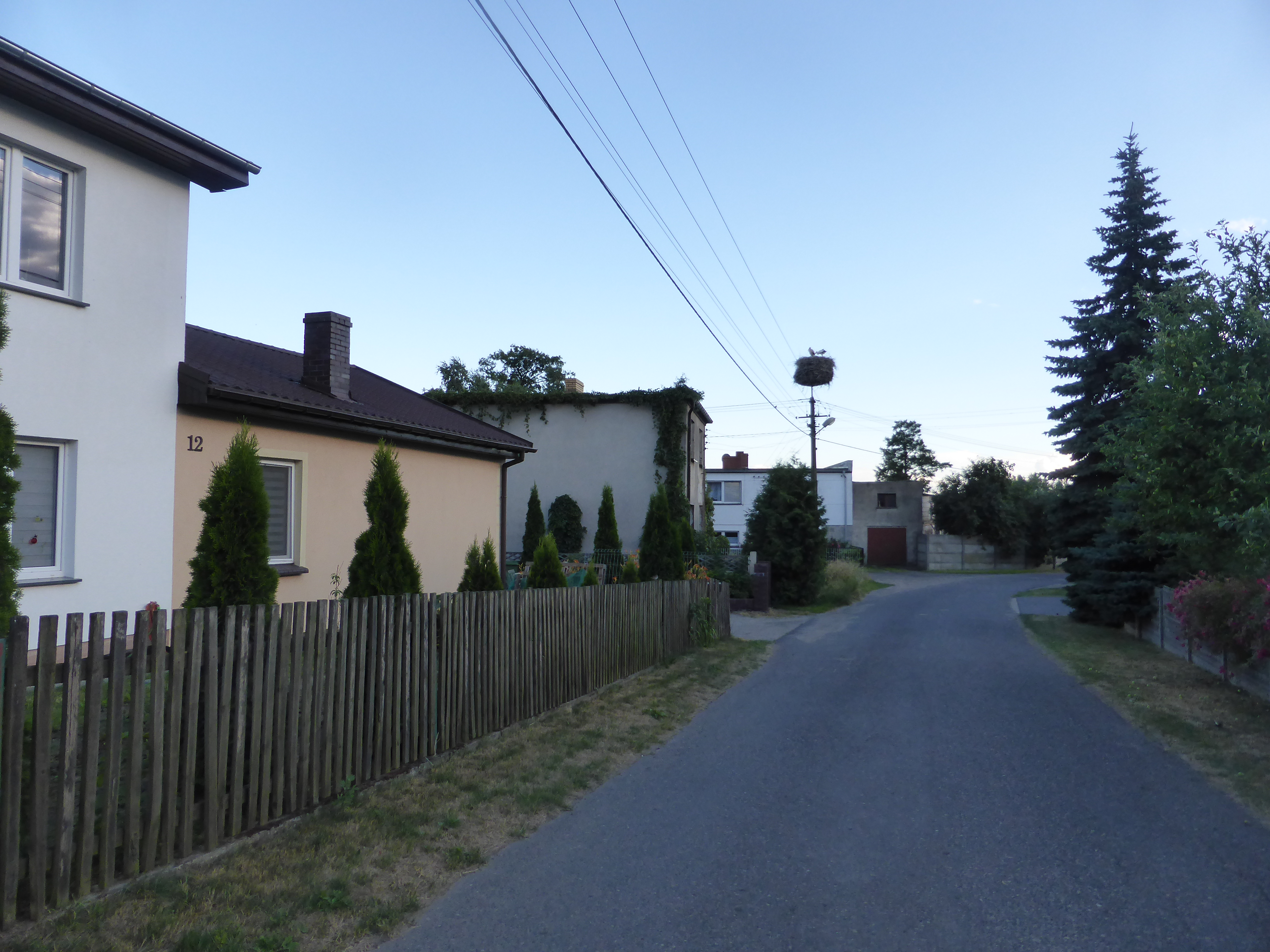

- Location within Poland
- Coordinates: 52°11′41″N 16°27′2″E
- Country: Poland
- Voivodeship: Greater Poland
- County: Grodzisk
- Gmina: Grodzisk Wielkopolski
- Population: 350

Borzysław [bɔˈʐɨswaf] is a village in the administrative district of Gmina Grodzisk Wielkopolski, within Grodzisk County, Greater Poland Voivodeship, in west-central Poland.
