= Dalekie, Gmina Granowo =

Dalekie
- Village
- Location within Poland
- Coordinates: 52°11′15″N 16°35′12″E
- Country: Poland
- Voivodeship: Greater Poland
- County: Grodzisk
- Gmina: Granowo

Dalekie [daˈlɛkʲɛ] is a village in the administrative district of Gmina Granowo, within Grodzisk County, Greater Poland Voivodeship, in west-central Poland.
