= Wilanowo =

Wilanowo may refer to the following places:

- Wilanowo, Greater Poland Voivodeship (west-central Poland)
- Wilanowo, Podlaskie Voivodeship (north-east Poland)
- Wilanowo, Pomeranian Voivodeship (north Poland)
