= Drużyn =

- Village
- Location within Poland
- Coordinates: 52°15′N 16°30′E
- Country: Poland
- Voivodeship: Greater Poland
- County: Grodzisk
- Gmina: Granowo

Drużyn [ˈdruʐɨn] is a village in the administrative district of Gmina Granowo, within Grodzisk County, Greater Poland Voivodeship, in west-central Poland.
