= Słocin =

- Village
- Location within Poland
- Coordinates: 52°15′20″N 16°21′0″E
- Country: Poland
- Voivodeship: Greater Poland
- County: Grodzisk
- Gmina: Grodzisk Wielkopolski
- Population: 591

Słocin [ˈswɔt͡ɕin] is a village in the administrative district of Gmina Grodzisk Wielkopolski, within Grodzisk County, Greater Poland Voivodeship, in west-central Poland.
