= Łęki Wielkie =

- Village
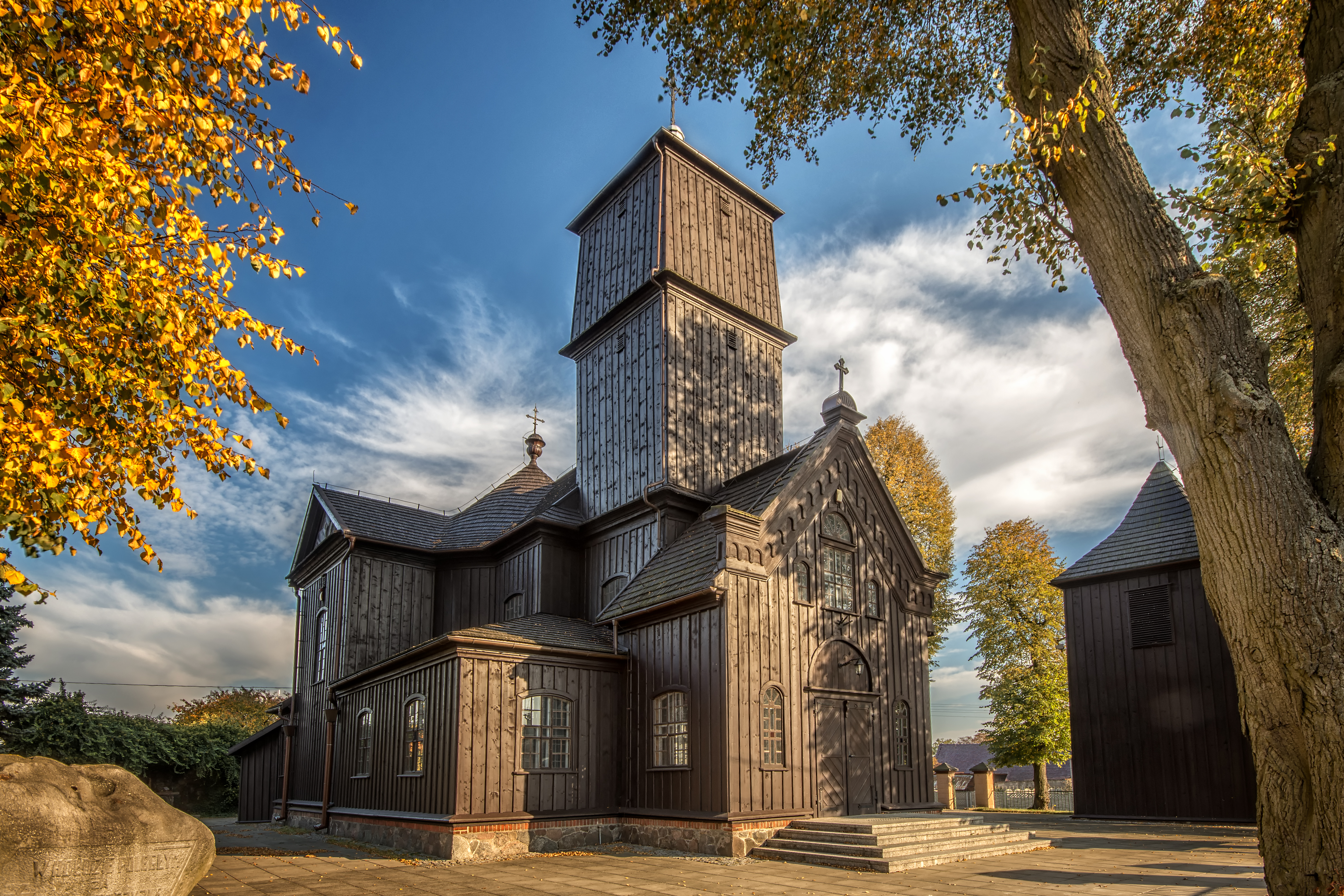
- Church of Saint Catherine and the Immaculate Heart of Virgin Mary

- Location within Poland
- Coordinates: 52°8′N 16°31′E
- Country: Poland
- Voivodeship: Greater Poland
- County: Grodzisk
- Gmina: Kamieniec

Population
  - Total: 294

Łęki Wielkie (Polish pronunciation: [ˈwɛŋkʲi ˈvjɛlkʲɛ]) is a village in the administrative district of Gmina Kamieniec, within Grodzisk County, Greater Poland Voivodeship, in west-central Poland.
