= Łęki Małe, Greater Poland Voivodeship =

Łęki Małe
- Village
- Location within Poland
- Coordinates: 52°8′39″N 16°32′17″E
- Country: Poland
- Voivodeship: Greater Poland
- County: Grodzisk
- Gmina: Kamieniec
- Population: 43

Łęki Małe (Polish pronunciation: [ˈwɛŋkʲi ˈmawɛ]) is a village in the administrative district of Gmina Kamieniec, within Grodzisk County, Greater Poland Voivodeship, in west-central Poland.

Close to the village are a series of burial mounds (kurgans) dating from the Bronze Age, belonging to the Únětice culture. These sometimes referred to as "Polish pyramids".

== Gallery ==
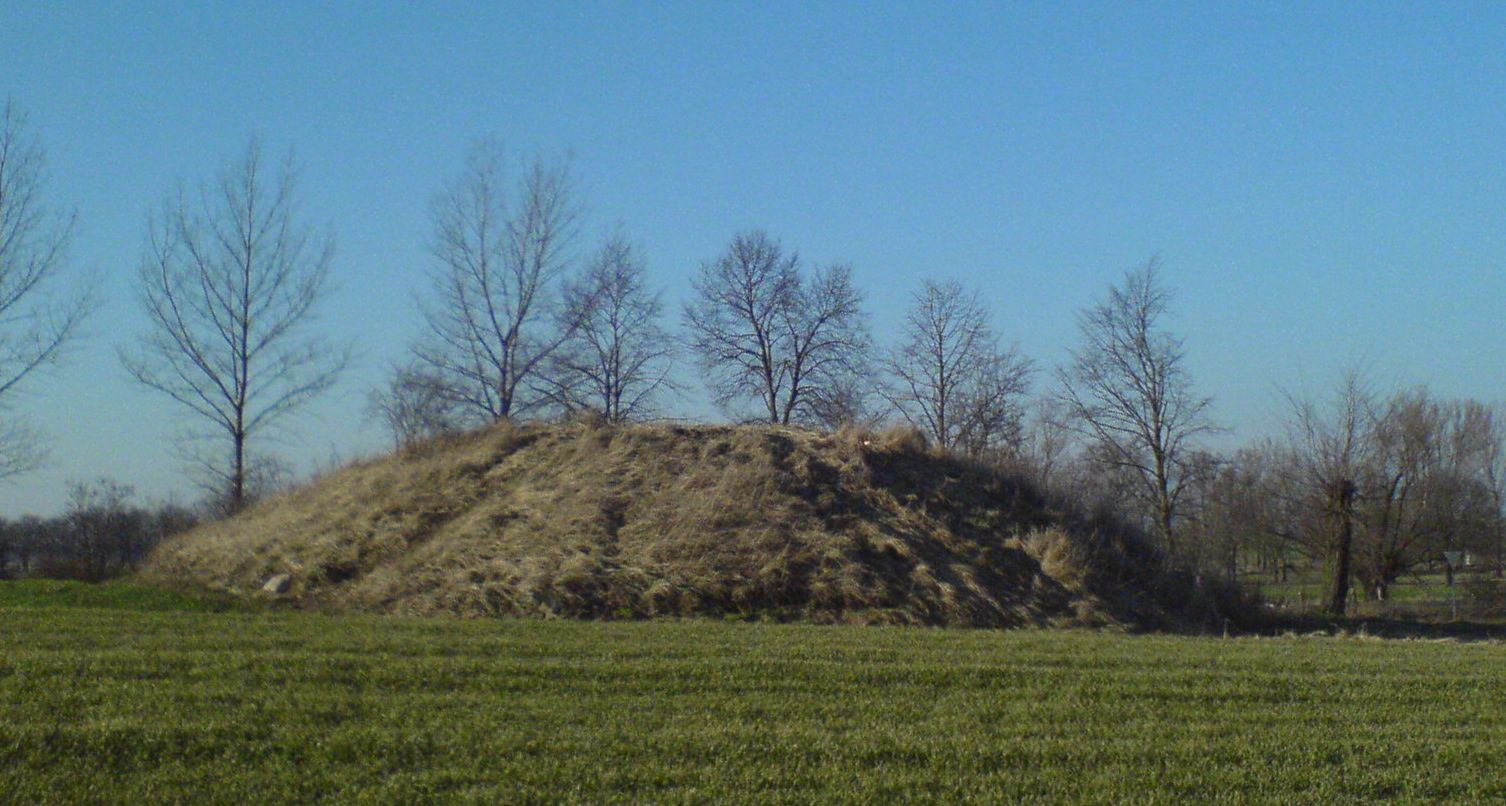
Early Bronze Age burial mound at Łęki Małe, Únětice culture

Burial mound internal structure

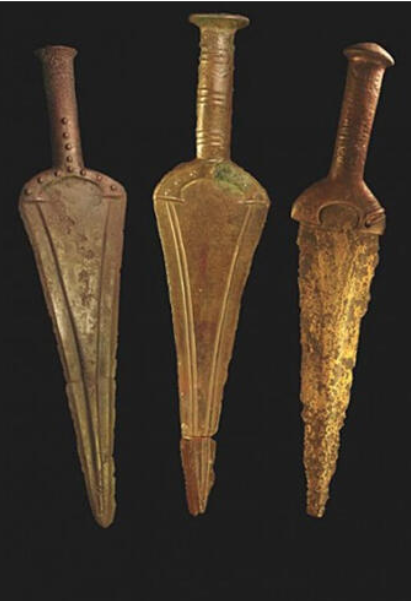
Bronze daggers from a burial mound at Łęki Małe, Únětice culture
