= Konojad =

- Village
- Location within Poland
- Coordinates: 52°10′N 16°33′E
- Country: Poland
- Voivodeship: Greater Poland
- County: Grodzisk
- Gmina: Kamieniec
- Population (approx.): 517

Konojad [kɔˈnɔjat] is a village in the administrative district of Gmina Kamieniec, within Grodzisk County, Greater Poland Voivodeship, in west-central Poland.

The village has an approximate population of 517.
