= Reńsko, Greater Poland Voivodeship =

Reńsko
- Village
- Location within Poland
- Coordinates: 52°6′N 16°26′E
- Country: Poland
- Voivodeship: Greater Poland
- County: Grodzisk
- Gmina: Wielichowo

Reńsko [ˈrɛɲskɔ] is a village in the administrative district of Gmina Wielichowo, within Grodzisk County, Greater Poland Voivodeship, in west-central Poland.
