= Pawłówko, Gmina Wielichowo =

Pawłówko
- Settlement
- Location within Poland
- Coordinates: 52°7′32″N 16°20′3″E
- Country: Poland
- Voivodeship: Greater Poland
- County: Grodzisk
- Gmina: Wielichowo

Pawłówko [paˈvwufkɔ] is a settlement in the administrative district of Gmina Wielichowo, within Grodzisk County, Greater Poland Voivodeship, in west-central Poland.
