= Lasówki =

Lasówki Lasowki
- Village
- Location within Poland
- Coordinates: 52°15′07″N 16°19′08″E
- Country: Poland
- Voivodeship: Greater Poland
- County: Grodzisk
- Gmina: Grodzisk Wielkopolski

Government
  - Mayor: Roman Ranke
- Population (2010): 160
- Time zone: UTC+1 (CET)
  - Summer (DST): UTC+2 (CEST)
- Postal code: 62-065
- Area code: +48 61
- Car Plates: PGO

Lasówki [laˈsufki] is a village in western Poland, in the administrative district of Gmina Grodzisk Wielkopolski. It houses the local Forest District Administration and has many new buildings. Separated from the woodland area is a landscape park (12.20 hectares) with several old trees. An eclectic villa (rather a hunting manor house), dating from around 1880-1890s, has been preserved. Further west, in the forest, is a large tree nursery.
