= Mokrzec =

Mokrzec may refer to the following places in Poland:

- Mokrzec, Gmina Wielichowo, Grodzisk County in Greater Poland Voivodeship (west-central Poland)
- Mokrzec, Międzychód County in Greater Poland Voivodeship (west-central Poland)
- Mokrzec, Masovian Voivodeship (east-central Poland)
- Mokrzec, Subcarpathian Voivodeship (south-east Poland)
