= Augustowo, Gmina Wielichowo =

Augustowo
- Village
- Location within Poland
- Coordinates: 52°10′N 16°20′E
- Country: Poland
- Voivodeship: Greater Poland
- County: Grodzisk
- Gmina: Wielichowo
- Population: 90

Augustowo [auɡusˈtɔvɔ] is a village in the administrative district of Gmina Wielichowo, within Grodzisk County, Greater Poland Voivodeship, in west-central Poland.
