= Cykówiec =

- Village
- Location within Poland
- Coordinates: 52°10′00″N 16°28′10″E
- Country: Poland
- Voivodeship: Greater Poland
- County: Grodzisk
- Gmina: Kamieniec
- Population: 37

Cykówiec [t͡sɨˈkuvjɛt͡s] is a village in the administrative district of Gmina Kamieniec, within Grodzisk County, Greater Poland Voivodeship, in west-central Poland.
