= Kuźnica Zbąska =

- Village
- Location within Poland
- Coordinates: 52°12′59″N 16°6′28″E
- Country: Poland
- Voivodeship: Greater Poland
- County: Grodzisk
- Gmina: Rakoniewice

Kuźnica Zbąska (Polish: [kuʑˈɲit͡sa ˈzbɔ̃ska]) is a village in the administrative district of Gmina Rakoniewice, within Grodzisk County, Greater Poland Voivodeship, in west-central Poland.
