= Ujazd-Huby =

- Village
- Location within Poland
- Coordinates: 52°12′09″N 16°23′49″E
- Country: Poland
- Voivodeship: Greater Poland
- County: Grodzisk
- Gmina: Kamieniec
- Population: 91

Ujazd-Huby [ˈujast ˈxubɨ] is a village in the administrative district of Gmina Kamieniec, within Grodzisk County, Greater Poland Voivodeship, in west-central Poland.
