= Cykowo, Greater Poland Voivodeship =

Cykowo
- Village
- Location within Poland
- Coordinates: 52°11′30″N 16°28′03″E
- Country: Poland
- Voivodeship: Greater Poland
- County: Grodzisk
- Gmina: Kamieniec
- Population: 122

Cykowo [t͡sɨˈkɔvɔ] is a village in the administrative district of Gmina Kamieniec, within Grodzisk County, Greater Poland Voivodeship, in west-central Poland.
