= Prochy =

Prochy may refer to:

- Prochy, Gmina Wielichowo, Grodzisk County in Greater Poland Voivodeship (west-central Poland)
- Prochy, Złotów County in Greater Poland Voivodeship (west-central Poland)
- Prochy, Wąbrzeźno County in Kuyavian-Pomeranian Voivodeship (north-central Poland)
