= Lulin (disambiguation) =

Lulin (Chinese: 綠林, Green Forest) is a name applied to early Chinese agrarian rebellious forces.

Lulin may also refer to:

- Lulin, Gmina Grodzisk Wielkopolski, Poland
- Lulin, Oborniki County, Poland
- Comet Lulin, a comet officially designated C/2007 N3 (Lulin)
- Lulin Observatory (Chinese: 鹿林, Deer Forest Observatory), in Taiwan
- Lulin station, Ningbo Metro station
- 145523 Lulin, an asteroid

== See also ==
- Lu Lin (disambiguation)
- Luling (disambiguation)
