= Wielichowo-Wieś =

- Village
- Location within Poland
- Coordinates: 52°06′44″N 16°21′35″E
- Country: Poland
- Voivodeship: Greater Poland
- County: Grodzisk
- Gmina: Wielichowo

Wielichowo-Wieś [vjɛliˈxɔvɔ ˈvjɛɕ] is a village in the administrative district of Gmina Wielichowo, within Grodzisk County, Greater Poland Voivodeship, in west-central Poland.
