= Stodolsko =

- Village
- Location within Poland
- Coordinates: 52°9′N 16°13′E
- Country: Poland
- Voivodeship: Greater Poland
- County: Grodzisk
- Gmina: Rakoniewice

Stodolsko [stɔˈdɔlskɔ] is a village in the administrative district of Gmina Rakoniewice, within Grodzisk County, Greater Poland Voivodeship, in west-central Poland.
