= Wilkowo Polskie =

- Village
- Location within Poland
- Coordinates: 52°3′45″N 16°26′1″E
- Country: Poland
- Voivodeship: Greater Poland
- County: Grodzisk
- Gmina: Wielichowo
- Population: 940

Wilkowo Polskie [vilˈkɔvɔ ˈpɔlskʲɛ] is a village in the administrative district of Gmina Wielichowo, within Grodzisk County, Greater Poland Voivodeship, in west-central Poland.
