= Cykówko =

- Village
- Location within Poland
- Coordinates: 52°12′12″N 16°27′58″E
- Country: Poland
- Voivodeship: Greater Poland
- County: Grodzisk
- Gmina: Kamieniec

Cykówko [t͡sɨˈkufkɔ] is a village in the administrative district of Gmina Kamieniec, within Grodzisk County, Greater Poland Voivodeship, in west-central Poland.
