= Separowo =

- Village
- Location within Poland
- Coordinates: 52°14′24″N 16°33′40″E
- Country: Poland
- Voivodeship: Greater Poland
- County: Grodzisk
- Gmina: Granowo

Separowo [sɛpaˈrɔvɔ] is a village in the administrative district of Gmina Granowo, within Grodzisk County, Greater Poland Voivodeship, in west-central Poland.
