= Puszczykowo (disambiguation) =

Puszczykowo is a town in Greater Poland Voivodeship, west-central Poland.

Puszczykowo may also refer to:

- Puszczykowo, Gmina Kamieniec, Grodzisk County in Greater Poland Voivodeship
- Puszczykowo, Lubusz Voivodeship (west Poland)
