= Faustynowo, Greater Poland Voivodeship =

Faustynowo
- Village
- Location within Poland
- Coordinates: 52°5′13″N 16°17′32″E
- Country: Poland
- Voivodeship: Greater Poland
- County: Grodzisk
- Gmina: Rakoniewice

Faustynowo [faustɨˈnɔvɔ] is a village in the administrative district of Gmina Rakoniewice, within Grodzisk County, Greater Poland Voivodeship, in west-central Poland.
