= Łubnica, Greater Poland Voivodeship =

Łubnica
- Village
- Location within Poland
- Coordinates: 52°10′N 16°23′E
- Country: Poland
- Voivodeship: Greater Poland
- County: Grodzisk
- Gmina: Wielichowo

Łubnica [wubˈnit͡sa] is a village in the administrative district of Gmina Wielichowo, within Grodzisk County, Greater Poland Voivodeship, in west-central Poland.
