= Chrustowo =

Chrustowo may refer to the following places:

- Chrustowo, Gmina Grodzisk Wielkopolski in Greater Poland Voivodeship (west-central Poland)
- Chrustowo, Koło County in Greater Poland Voivodeship (central Poland)
- Chrustowo, Oborniki County in Greater Poland Voivodeship (west-central Poland)
- Chrustowo, Piła County in Greater Poland Voivodeship (west-central Poland)
- Chrustowo, Września County in Greater Poland Voivodeship (west-central Poland)
