= Głodno =

Głodno may refer to the following places:

- Głodno, Gmina Rakoniewice, Grodzisk County in Greater Poland Voivodeship (west-central Poland)
- Głodno, Konin County in Greater Poland Voivodeship (west-central Poland)
- Głodno, Lublin Voivodeship (east Poland)
