= Snowidowo =

- Village
- Location within Poland
- Coordinates: 52°14′49″N 16°25′55″E
- Country: Poland
- Voivodeship: Greater Poland
- County: Grodzisk
- Gmina: Grodzisk Wielkopolski

Snowidowo [snɔviˈdɔvɔ] is a village in the administrative district of Gmina Grodzisk Wielkopolski, within Grodzisk County, Greater Poland Voivodeship, in west-central Poland.
