= Rostarzewo =

- Village
- Location within Poland
- Coordinates: 52°8′N 16°12′E
- Country: Poland
- Voivodeship: Greater Poland
- County: Grodzisk
- Gmina: Rakoniewice
- Population: 1,400

Rostarzewo [rɔstaˈʐɛvɔ] (German: Rothenburg an der Obra) is a village in the administrative district of Gmina Rakoniewice, within Grodzisk County, Greater Poland Voivodeship, in west-central Poland.

== History ==
The village of Rostarzewo was first mentioned in 1379. It was destroyed in the Great Northern War between 1700 and 1721. In 1746, the deserted village was declared a Hauländerei and was rebuilt by German Protestant settlers from Silesia. In 1752, it was elevated to the status of a town under Magdeburg law. The first German name Rothenburg comes from this time.

In 1793, with the Second Partition of Poland the town was annexed by the Kingdom of Prussia and was incorporated into the Bomst district. In 1905, the town had 1,187 inhabitants, of which 1,032 (86.9%) were Germans and 152 (12.8%) were Poles.

Until the end of World War I in 1918, Rothenburg belonged to the Bomst district in the Prussian Province of Posen in Germany. After the end of the war, the town became part of Poland and the name Rostarzewo was restored. In 1934, Rostarzewo lost its town charter.
