= Strzępiń =

- Village
- Location within Poland
- Coordinates: 52°15′53″N 16°33′36″E
- Country: Poland
- Voivodeship: Greater Poland
- County: Grodzisk
- Gmina: Granowo

Strzępiń [ˈstʂɛmpiɲ] is a village in the administrative district of Gmina Granowo, within Grodzisk County, Greater Poland Voivodeship, in west-central Poland.
