= Dębsko, Gmina Wielichowo =

Dębsko
- Village
- Location within Poland
- Coordinates: 52°8′N 16°19′E
- Country: Poland
- Voivodeship: Greater Poland
- County: Grodzisk
- Gmina: Wielichowo

Dębsko (Polish pronunciation: [ˈdɛmpskɔ]) is a village in the administrative district of Gmina Wielichowo, within Grodzisk County, Greater Poland Voivodeship, in west-central Poland.
