= Zielęcin =

Zielęcin may refer to the following places:

- Zielęcin, Greater Poland Voivodeship (west-central Poland)
- Zielęcin, Pajęczno County in Łódź Voivodeship (central Poland)
- Zielęcin, Sieradz County in Łódź Voivodeship (central Poland)
