= Kurowo, Gmina Grodzisk Wielkopolski =

Kurowo
- Village
- Location within Poland
- Coordinates: 52°16′N 16°23′E
- Country: Poland
- Voivodeship: Greater Poland
- County: Grodzisk
- Gmina: Grodzisk Wielkopolski

Kurowo [kuˈrɔvɔ] is a village in the administrative district of Gmina Grodzisk Wielkopolski, within Grodzisk County, Greater Poland Voivodeship, in west-central Poland.
