= Plastowo =

- Village
- Location within Poland
- Coordinates: 52°09′48″N 16°28′50″E
- Country: Poland
- Voivodeship: Greater Poland
- County: Grodzisk
- Gmina: Kamieniec

Plastowo [plasˈtɔvɔ] is a village in the administrative district of Gmina Kamieniec, within Grodzisk County, Greater Poland Voivodeship, in west-central Poland.
