= Kąkolewo, Gmina Grodzisk Wielkopolski =

Kąkolewo
- Village
- Location within Poland
- Coordinates: 52°14′N 16°14′E
- Country: Poland
- Voivodeship: Greater Poland
- County: Grodzisk
- Gmina: Grodzisk Wielkopolski
- Population: 699

Kąkolewo [kɔŋkɔˈlɛvɔ] is a village in the administrative district of Gmina Grodzisk Wielkopolski, within Grodzisk County, Greater Poland Voivodeship, in west-central Poland.
