= Woźniki, Gmina Grodzisk Wielkopolski =

Woźniki
- Village
- Location within Poland
- Coordinates: 52°15′N 16°28′E
- Country: Poland
- Voivodeship: Greater Poland
- County: Grodzisk
- Gmina: Grodzisk Wielkopolski
- Population: 128

Woźniki [vɔʑˈɲikʲi] is a village in the administrative district of Gmina Grodzisk Wielkopolski, within Grodzisk County, Greater Poland Voivodeship, in west-central Poland.
