= Maksymilianowo, Greater Poland Voivodeship =

Maksymilianowo
- Village
- Location within Poland
- Coordinates: 52°10′N 16°34′E
- Country: Poland
- Voivodeship: Greater Poland
- County: Grodzisk
- Gmina: Kamieniec
- Population: 232

Maksymilianowo [maksɨmiljaˈnɔvɔ] is a village in the administrative district of Gmina Kamieniec, within Grodzisk County, Greater Poland Voivodeship, in west-central Poland.
