= Biała Wieś, Greater Poland Voivodeship =

Biała Wieś
- Village
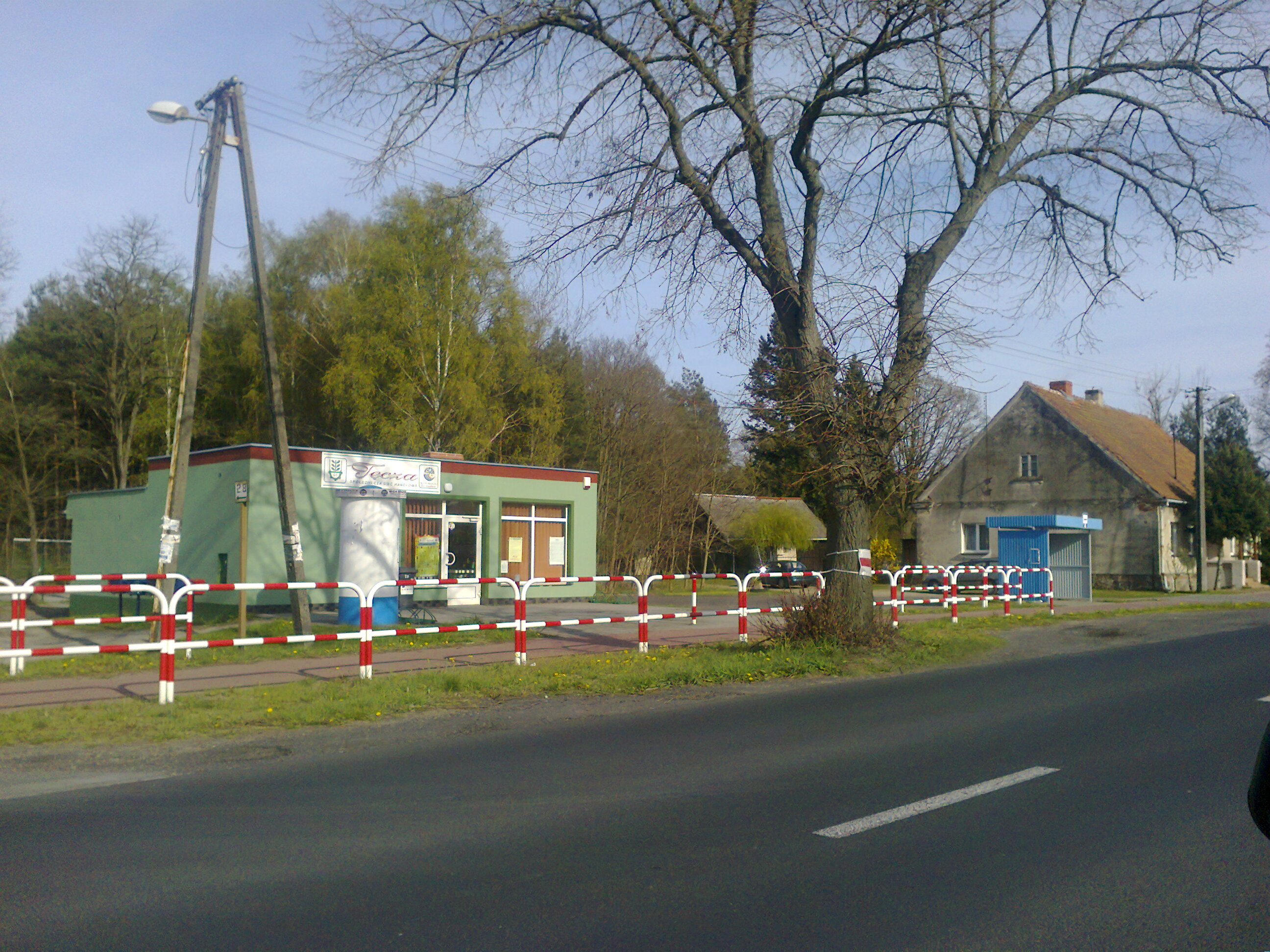

- Location within Poland
- Coordinates: 52°16′31.2″N 16°17′15.9″E
- Country: Poland
- Voivodeship: Greater Poland
- County: Grodzisk
- Gmina: Grodzisk Wielkopolski

Biała Wieś [ˈbjawa ˈvjɛɕ] is a village in the administrative district of Gmina Grodzisk Wielkopolski, within Grodzisk County, Greater Poland Voivodeship, in west-central Poland.
