= Łąkie Nowe =

- Village
- Location within Poland
- Coordinates: 52°6′12″N 16°14′50″E
- Country: Poland
- Voivodeship: Greater Poland
- County: Grodzisk
- Gmina: Rakoniewice

Łąkie Nowe [ˈwɔnkʲɛ ˈnɔvɛ] is a village in the administrative district of Gmina Rakoniewice, within Grodzisk County, Greater Poland Voivodeship, in west-central Poland.
