= Wolkowo =

Wolkowo may refer to the following places in Poland:

- Wolkowo, Gmina Kamieniec, Grodzisk County, Greater Poland Voivodeship (west-central Poland)
- Wolkowo, Leszno County, Greater Poland Voivodeship (west-central Poland)
- Wołkowo, West Pomeranian Voivodeship (north-west Poland)
