= Sepno, Gmina Kamieniec =

Sepno
- Village
- Location within Poland
- Coordinates: 52°8′32″N 16°33′43″E
- Country: Poland
- Voivodeship: Greater Poland
- County: Grodzisk
- Gmina: Kamieniec
- Population: 492

Sepno [ˈsɛpnɔ] is a village in the administrative district of Gmina Kamieniec, within the Grodzisk County, Greater Poland Voivodeship, in west-central Poland.
