= Tarnowa, Gmina Rakoniewice =

Tarnowa
- Village
- Location within Poland
- Coordinates: 52°6′N 16°17′E
- Country: Poland
- Voivodeship: Greater Poland
- County: Grodzisk
- Gmina: Rakoniewice

Tarnowa [tarˈnɔva] is a village in the administrative district of Gmina Rakoniewice, within Grodzisk County, Greater Poland Voivodeship, in west-central Poland.
