= Trzcinica =

Trzcinica may refer to the following places:

- Trzcinica, Gmina Wielichowo, Grodzisk County in Greater Poland Voivodeship (west-central Poland)
- Trzcinica, Kępno County in Greater Poland Voivodeship (west-central Poland)
- Trzcinica, Subcarpathian Voivodeship (south-east Poland)
