= Bielawy, Gmina Granowo =

Bielawy
- Village
- Location within Poland
- Coordinates: 52°15′29″N 16°34′51″E
- Country: Poland
- Voivodeship: Greater Poland
- County: Grodzisk
- Gmina: Granowo

Bielawy [bjɛˈlavɨ] is a village in the administrative district of Gmina Granowo, within Grodzisk County, Greater Poland Voivodeship, in west-central Poland.
