= Puszczykówiec =

- Village
- Location within Poland
- Coordinates: 52°07′25″N 16°25′58″E
- Country: Poland
- Voivodeship: Greater Poland
- County: Grodzisk
- Gmina: Kamieniec
- Population: 72

Puszczykówiec [puʂt͡ʂɨˈkuvjɛt͡s] is a village in the administrative district of Gmina Kamieniec, within Grodzisk County, Greater Poland Voivodeship, in west-central Poland.
