= Rojewo =

Rojewo may refer to the following places:

- Rojewo, Greater Poland Voivodeship (west-central Poland)
- Rojewo, Inowrocław County in Kuyavian-Pomeranian Voivodeship (north-central Poland)
- Rojewo, Lubusz Voivodeship (west Poland)
- Rojewo, Rypin County in Kuyavian-Pomeranian Voivodeship (north-central Poland)
