= Jaskółki, Gmina Kamieniec =

Jaskółki
- Village
- Location within Poland
- Coordinates: 52°11′11″N 16°29′45″E
- Country: Poland
- Voivodeship: Greater Poland
- County: Grodzisk
- Gmina: Kamieniec
- Population: 144

Jaskółki [jasˈkuu̯ki] is a village in the administrative district of Gmina Kamieniec, within Grodzisk County, Greater Poland Voivodeship, in west-central Poland.
