= Liangping Airport =

Airport in China

Liangping Airport 梁平机场
- IATA: LIA; ICAO: ZULP

Summary
- Airport type: Military/Former public
- Location: Liangping District, Chongqing, China
- Coordinates: 30°40′46″N 107°47′10″E

Map
- Location of airport in Chongqing

Runways
Direction	Length		Surface
Direction	m	ft	Surface
05/23	2,300	7,546	Concrete

Liangping Airport (Chinese: 梁平机场) (IATA: LIA, ICAO: ZULP), also called Liangshan Airport, is a former dual-use military and civil airport, located north of Liangping District (formerly called Liangshan) in Chongqing Municipality, China. It served the city of Wanxian (now Wanzhou District) from July 1988 until May 2003, when all civil flights were transferred to the new Wanzhou Wuqiao Airport.

== History ==
Originally called Liangshan, the spot where the airport sits today was originally a military base established in 1923 by the local "Lülin" (Hanzi: 绿林 - "Green Forest") militia for the Sichuanese warlord Yang Sen; it was later expanded into an airbase for flight operations of the air force under succeeding warlord Liu Xiang in 1928–1929, with earthen runways 600 meters north to south and 700 meters east to west.

With the outbreak of the War of Resistance-World War II following the 7/7 Incident in 1937, Liangshan Airfield, as it became known as, was integrated along with the warlord aircraft assets and personnel into the centralized command of the nominally Nationalist Air Force of China; Liangshan Airfield served in defense of Sichuan as well as launching fighters on escort missions for bombing runs against Japanese positions in Hubei. Liangshan Airfield served as a forward air force base stationing the 24th PS, 4th PG which regularly engaged attacks by the Imperial Japanese Navy Air Force and Army Air Force in the Battle of Chongqing and Chengdu; one such major aerial combat engagement occurring over Liangshan on 20 May 1940 when 24 bombers raided Liangshan and was met with eight Polikarpov I-16 Type 17 fighters of the 24th PS led by Capt. Li Wenxu (all having to launch in single-file as bombing damage to the runways on night before of 19 May weren't completely fixed) and claimed seven Japanese aircraft shot down (three bombers and a reconnaissance-attack plane among confirmed kills).

After the Americans entered World War II following the Pearl Harbor attack, the airport was also used by the United States Army Air Forces Fourteenth Air Force as part of the China Defensive Campaign (1942–1945). The airport was primarily used by transport units, flying C-47 Skytrain in and out of the airport carry supplies, troops and equipment. In addition, unarmed P-38 Lightning photo-reconnaissance aircraft flew from the airport to gathering intelligence over Japanese-held areas. The airport was defended by the 426th Night Fighter Squadron, which operated P-61 Black Widow interceptors on night missions against any attacking enemy aircraft in the Chongqing area. On 06 June 1943, the new CO of the P-40E Warhawk-equipped 23rd PS, 4th PG, Captain Zhou Zhikai and his squadron had just landed back in Liangshan from a close-air support mission, and while their Warharks underwent post-flight service, the airbase was suddenly attacked by IJA aircraft; Captain Zhou "hijacked" a USAAF P-66 Vanguard that happened to be nearby and ready, and managed to takeoff in pursuit of the raiders, shooting down two Ki-48 bombers in the process and damaging another, however, the Japanese airstrike was able to destroy eleven of the P-40E that were parked. The Americans closed their facilities at the airport at the end of the war.

In the seven years of air battles over Sichuan, from 1938 to 1945, the Imperial Japanese raiders attacked Liangshan airbase alone with 7,855 bombs, resulting in the deaths of more than 2,000 military and civilian personnel; thousands of migrant workers worked feverishly to keep the airbase and facilities repaired, of these, 522 migrant workers died during combat operations, while over 3,000 migrant workers died in total from all causes, including cholera in those war years.

The airport was opened to commercial flights on 14 July 1988, and over the years had routes to Chengdu, Wuhan, Xi'an, Chongqing, and Guangzhou. During its heyday in 1992 and 1993, Liangping Airport was the 54th-busiest among the 110 airports that were in China at the time. The airport had its final commercial flight on May 25, 2003.

== See also ==
- Civil aviation in China
- List of airports in China
- List of the busiest airports in China
