= Goździchowo =

- Village
- Location within Poland
- Coordinates: 52°9′N 16°28′E
- Country: Poland
- Voivodeship: Greater Poland
- County: Grodzisk
- Gmina: Kamieniec
- Population: 107

Goździchowo [ɡɔʑd͡ʑiˈxɔvɔ] is a village in the administrative district of Gmina Kamieniec, within Grodzisk County, Greater Poland Voivodeship, in west-central Poland.
