= Helenopol, Gmina Wielichowo =

Helenopol
- Settlement
- Location within Poland
- Coordinates: 52°4′48″N 16°27′13″E
- Country: Poland
- Voivodeship: Greater Poland
- County: Grodzisk
- Gmina: Wielichowo

Helenopol [xɛlɛˈnɔpɔl] is a settlement in the administrative district of Gmina Wielichowo, within Grodzisk County, Greater Poland Voivodeship, in west-central Poland.
