= Karczewo, Gmina Kamieniec =

Karczewo
- Village
- Location within Poland
- Coordinates: 52°12′N 16°30′E
- Country: Poland
- Voivodeship: Greater Poland
- County: Grodzisk
- Gmina: Kamieniec
- Population: 479

Karczewo [karˈt͡ʂɛvɔ] is a village in the administrative district of Gmina Kamieniec, within Grodzisk County, Greater Poland Voivodeship, in west-central Poland.
