= Gmina Wielichowo =

Gmina Wielichowo Wielichowo Commune
- Gmina
- Coat of arms
- Interactive map of Gmina Wielichowo
- Coordinates (Wielichowo): 52°7′8″N 16°20′58″E
- Country: Poland
- Voivodeship: Greater Poland
- County: Grodzisk
- Seat: Wielichowo

Area
  - Total: 107.43 km^{2} (41.48 sq mi)

Population (2011)
  - Total: 6,894
  - Density: 64.17/km^{2} (166.2/sq mi)
  - Urban: 1,757
  - Rural: 5,110
- Website: www.wielichowo.pl

Gmina Wielichowo is an urban-rural gmina (administrative district) in Grodzisk County, Greater Poland Voivodeship, in west-central Poland. Its seat is the town of Wielichowo, which lies approximately 13 kilometres (8 mi) south of Grodzisk Wielkopolski and 50 km (31 mi) south-west of the regional capital Poznań.

The gmina covers an area of 107.43 square kilometres (41.5 sq mi), and as of 2006 its total population is 6,894 (out of which the population of Wielichowo amounts to 1,765, and the population of the rural part of the gmina is 5,129).

== Villages ==
Apart from the town of Wielichowo, Gmina Wielichowo contains the villages and settlements of Augustowo, Borek, Celinki, Dębsko, Gradowice, Helenopol, Łubnica, Mokrzec, Pawłówko, Piotrowo Wielkie, Prochy, Pruszkowo, Reńsko, Śniaty, Trzcinica, Wielichowo-Wieś, Wilkowo Polskie, Zielęcin and Ziemin.

== Neighbouring gminas ==
Gmina Wielichowo is bordered by the gminas of Kamieniec, Przemęt, Rakoniewice and Śmigiel.
