= Gmina Rakoniewice =

Gmina Rakoniewice Rakoniewice Commune
- Gmina
- Coat of arms
- Interactive map of Gmina Rakoniewice
- Coordinates (Rakoniewice): 52°8′27″N 16°16′23″E
- Country: Poland
- Voivodeship: Greater Poland
- County: Grodzisk
- Seat: Rakoniewice

Area
  - Total: 201.15 km^{2} (77.66 sq mi)

Population (2011)
  - Total: 12,896
  - Density: 64.111/km^{2} (166.05/sq mi)
  - Urban: 3,486
  - Rural: 9,410
- Website: www.rakoniewice.pl

Gmina Rakoniewice is an urban-rural gmina (administrative district) in Grodzisk County, Greater Poland Voivodeship, in west-central Poland. Its seat is the town of Rakoniewice, which lies approximately 13 kilometres (8 mi) south-west of Grodzisk Wielkopolski and 53 km (33 mi) south-west of the regional capital Poznań.

The gmina covers an area of 201.15 square kilometres (77.7 sq mi), and as of 2006 its total population is 12,515 (out of which the population of Rakoniewice amounts to 3,253, and the population of the rural part of the gmina is 9,262).

== Villages ==
Apart from the town of Rakoniewice, Gmina Rakoniewice contains the villages and settlements of Adolfowo, Blinek, Błońsko, Cegielsko, Drzymałowo, Elżbieciny, Faustynowo, Głodno, Gnin, Gola, Goździn, Jabłonna, Józefin, Komorówko, Kuźnica Zbąska, Łąkie, Łąkie Nowe, Narożniki, Rakoniewice-Wieś, Rataje, Rostarzewo, Ruchocice, Stodolsko, Tarnowa, Terespol, Wioska and Wola Jabłońska.

== Neighbouring gminas ==
Gmina Rakoniewice is bordered by the gminas of Grodzisk Wielkopolski, Kamieniec, Nowy Tomyśl, Przemęt, Siedlec, Wielichowo and Wolsztyn.
