= Rojewo, Greater Poland Voivodeship =

Rojewo
- Village
- Location within Poland
- Coordinates: 52°15′5″N 16°16′30″E
- Country: Poland
- Voivodeship: Greater Poland
- County: Grodzisk
- Gmina: Grodzisk Wielkopolski

Rojewo [rɔˈjɛvɔ] is a village in the administrative district of Gmina Grodzisk Wielkopolski, within Grodzisk County, Greater Poland Voivodeship, in west-central Poland.
