= Chrustowo, Gmina Grodzisk Wielkopolski =

Chrustowo
- Village
- Location within Poland
- Coordinates: 52°11′38″N 16°22′06″E
- Country: Poland
- Voivodeship: Greater Poland
- County: Grodzisk
- Gmina: Grodzisk Wielkopolski

Chrustowo [xrusˈtɔvɔ] is a village in the administrative district of Gmina Grodzisk Wielkopolski, within Grodzisk County, Greater Poland Voivodeship, in west-central Poland.
