= Rataje, Gmina Rakoniewice =

Rataje
- Village
- Location within Poland
- Coordinates: 52°11′N 16°22′E
- Country: Poland
- Voivodeship: Greater Poland
- County: Grodzisk
- Gmina: Rakoniewice

Rataje [raˈtajɛ] is a village in the administrative district of Gmina Rakoniewice, within Grodzisk County, Greater Poland Voivodeship, in west-central Poland.
