= Granowo, Greater Poland Voivodeship =

Granowo
- Village
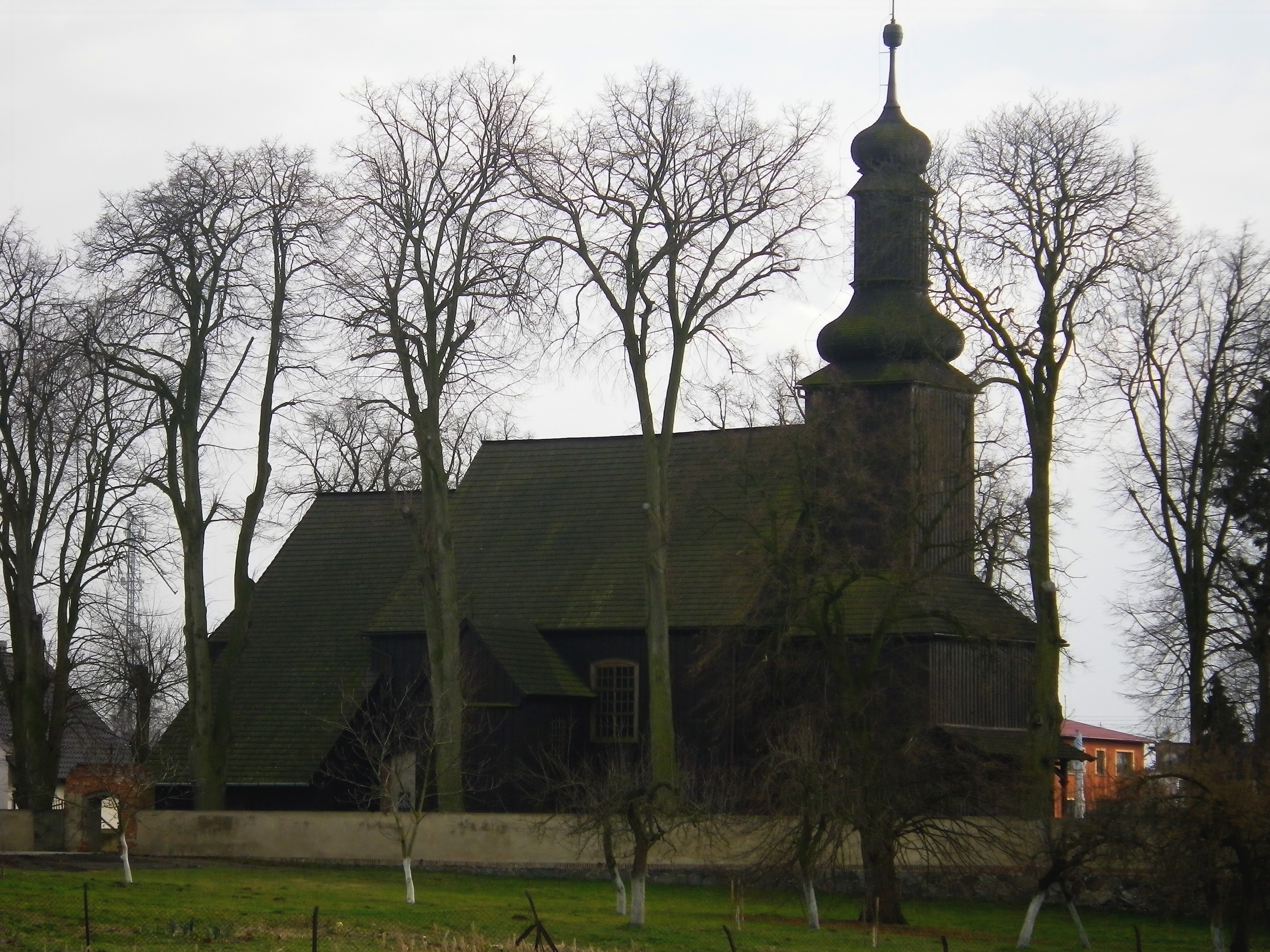
- Parish church of Saint Martin from 1729.

- Location within Poland
- Coordinates: 52°13′20″N 16°31′41″E
- Country: Poland
- Voivodeship: Greater Poland
- County: Grodzisk
- Gmina: Granowo
- Population: 2,732

Granowo ([ɡraˈnɔvɔ]; German: Granowo, 1943–45 Granau) is a village in Grodzisk County, Greater Poland Voivodeship, in west-central Poland. It is the seat of the gmina (administrative district) called Gmina Granowo.
