= Lu Lin =

Lu Lin may refer to:

- Lü Lin (table tennis) (吕林, born 1969), a Chinese table tennis player
- Lu Lin (footballer) (卢琳, born 1985), a Chinese football player

== See also ==
- Lulin (disambiguation)
