= Wolkowo, Gmina Kamieniec =

Wolkowo
- Village
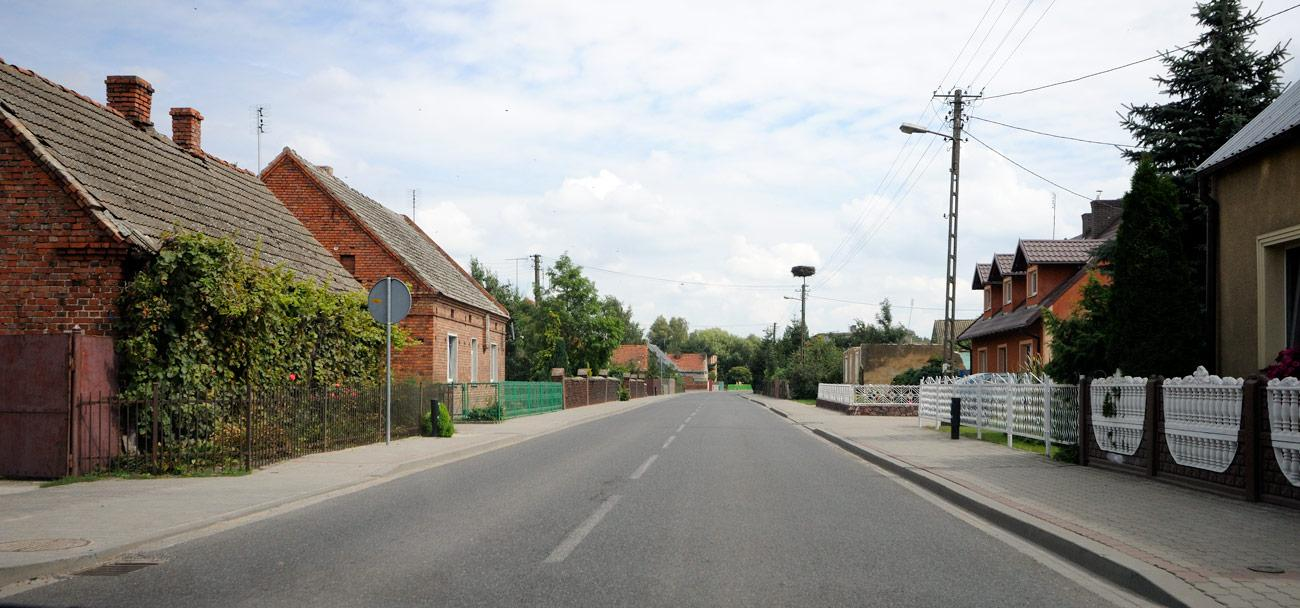
- Wolkowo (2011)

- Location within Poland
- Coordinates: 52°09′16″N 16°29′54″E
- Country: Poland
- Voivodeship: Greater Poland
- County: Grodzisk
- Gmina: Kamieniec
- Population: 348

Wolkowo [vɔlˈkɔvɔ] is a village in the administrative district of Gmina Kamieniec, within Grodzisk County, Greater Poland Voivodeship, in west-central Poland.
