= Wielichowo =

Town in Greater Poland Voivodeship, Poland

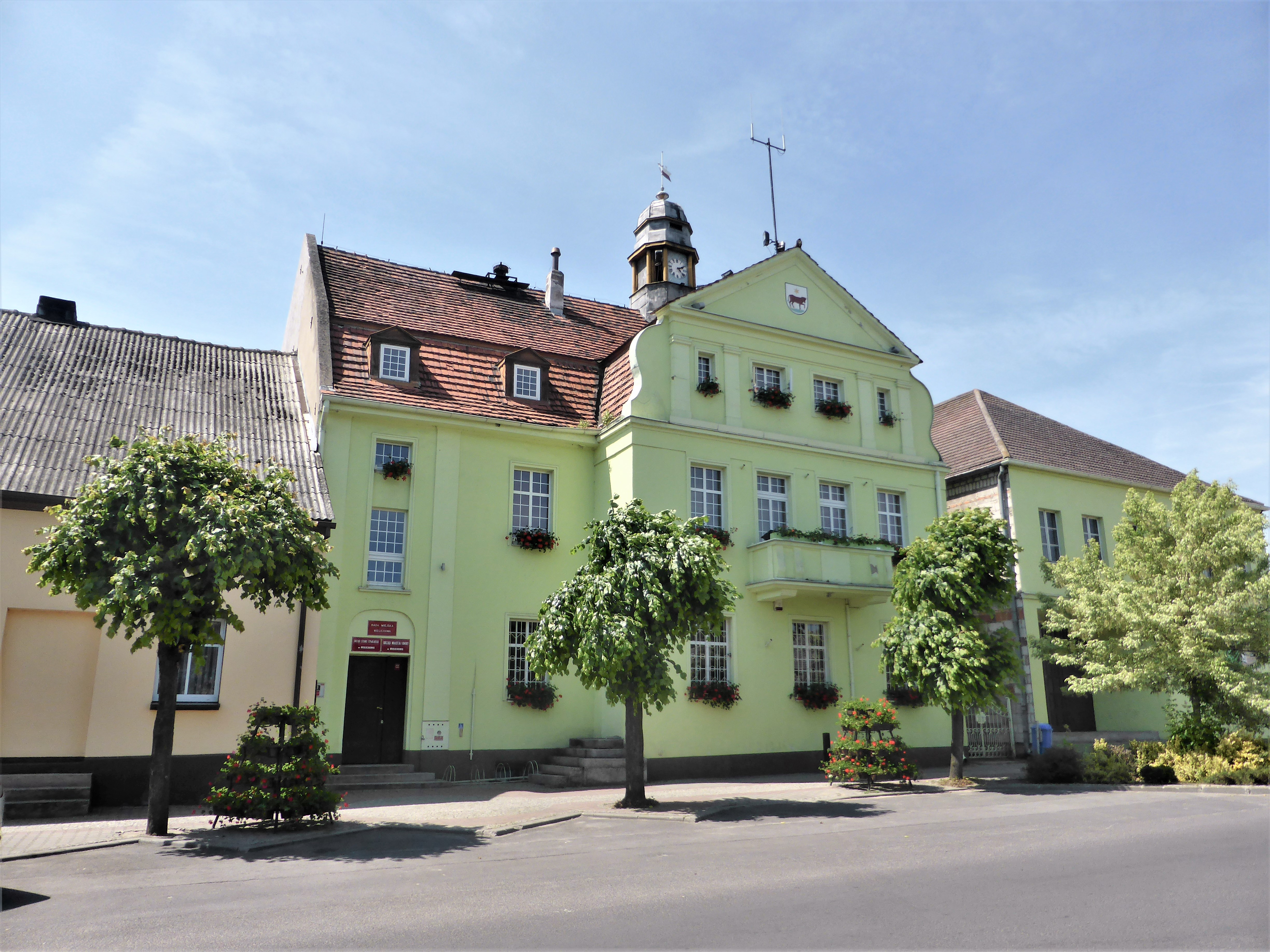
- Town hall

- Coat of arms

- Location within Poland
- Coordinates: 52°07′06″N 16°21′00″E
- Country: Poland
- Voivodeship: Greater Poland
- County: Grodzisk
- Gmina: Wielichowo
- Town rights: 1429

Area
  - Total: 1.24 km^{2} (0.48 sq mi)

Population (2010)
  - Total: 1,746
  - Density: 1,410/km^{2} (3,650/sq mi)
- Time zone: UTC+1 (CET)
  - Summer (DST): UTC+2 (CEST)
- Postal code: 64-050
- Vehicle registration: PGO
- Website: http://www.wielichowo.pl

Wielichowo [vjɛliˈxɔvɔ] is a town in Grodzisk County, Greater Poland Voivodeship, in western Poland, with 1,746 inhabitants (2010).

== History ==
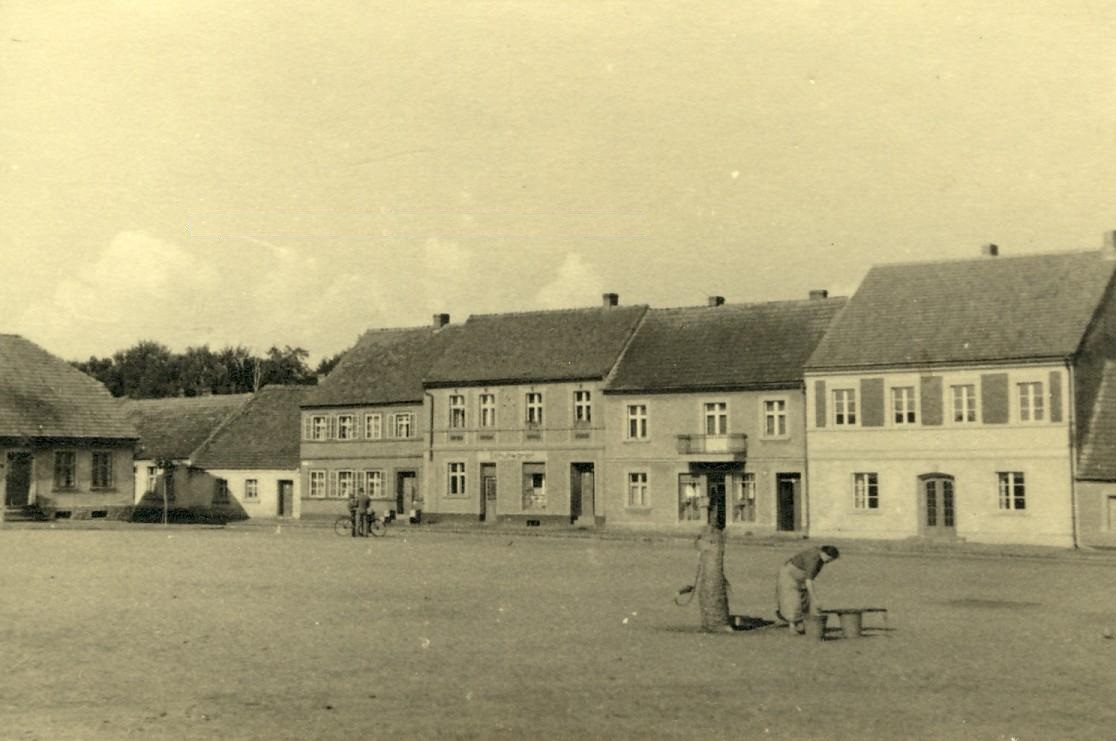
Wielichowo in 1943

Wielichowo was granted town rights in 1429 by King Władysław II Jagiełło. It was a private church town, administratively located in the Kościan County in the Poznań Voivodeship in the Greater Poland Province of the Kingdom of Poland.

According to the 1921 Polish census, the population was 97.4% Polish.

Following the joint German-Soviet invasion of Poland, which started World War II in September 1939, the town was occupied by Germany until 1945. Some Poles from Wielichowo were among the victims of the massacre of Poles committed by the Germans in nearby Kościan on October 23, 1939 as part of the genocidal Intelligenzaktion campaign, whereas a local Polish policeman was among the victims of the Russian-perpetrated Katyn massacre in 1940. In 1939–1941, the occupiers carried out expulsions of Poles, who were either deported to the General Government in the more-eastern part of German-occupied Poland or to forced labour in Germany, while their houses were handed over to German colonists as part of the Lebensraum policy.

== Demographics ==
Historical population

Year	Pop.	±%
1910	1,874	—
1921	1,815	−3.1%
1931	1,630	−10.2%
1939	1,717	+5.3%

Year	Pop.	±%
1950	1,334	−22.3%
1960	1,395	+4.6%
2010	1,746	+25.2%
