= Wanzhou Wuqiao Airport =

Airport serving Chongqing, China

Wanzhou Wuqiao Airport 万州五桥机场
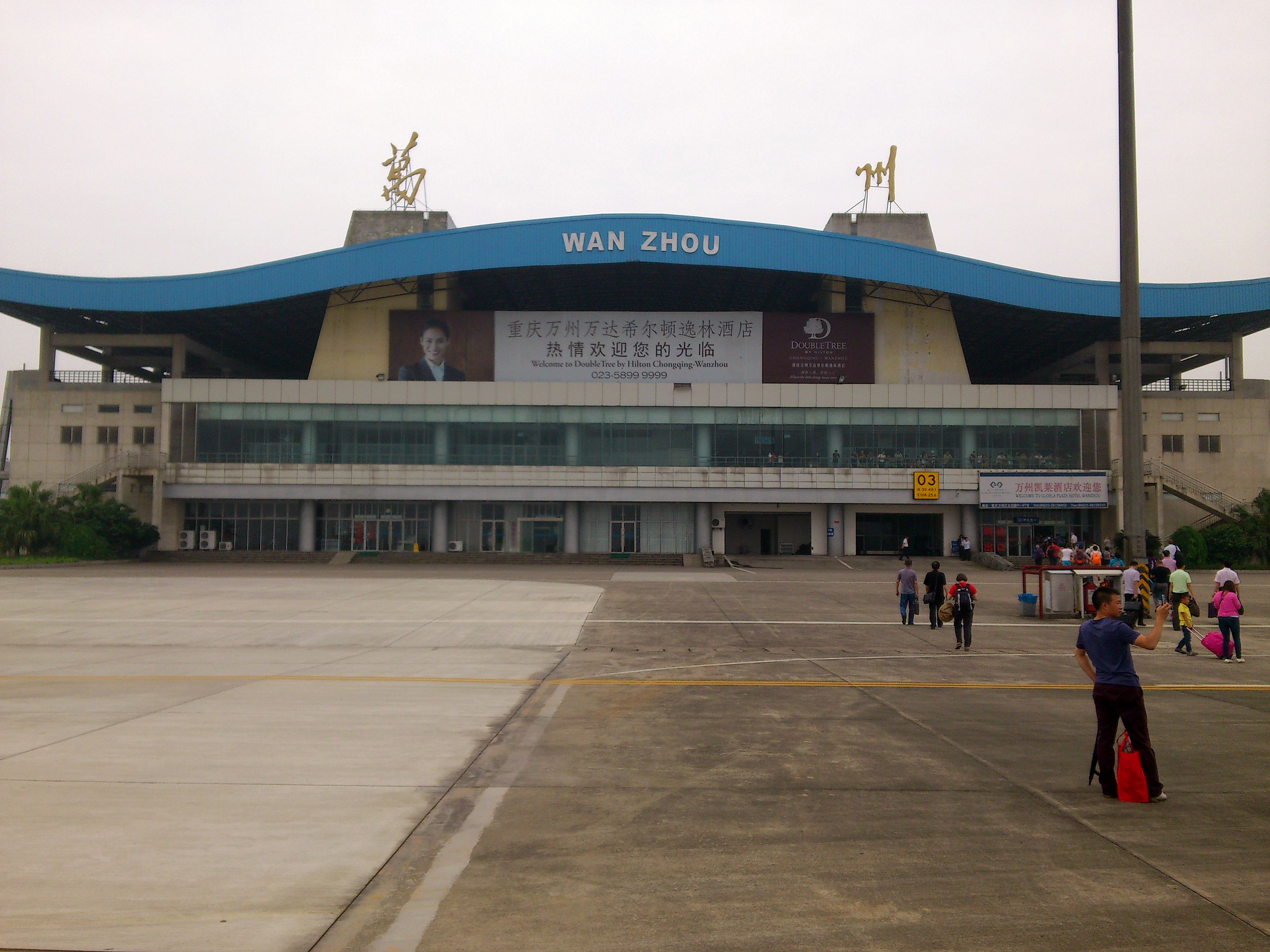
- IATA: WXN; ICAO: ZUWX

Summary
- Airport type: Public
- Location: Wanzhou District, Chongqing
- Opened: 29 May 2003; 23 years ago
- Elevation AMSL: 569 m (1,867 ft)
- Coordinates: 30°47′52″N 108°25′53″E

Map
- Location in Chongqing WXN/ZUWX (China)

Runways
| Direction | Length | | Surface |
| Direction | m | ft | Surface |
|---|---|---|---|
| 11/29 | 2,400 | 7,874 | Concrete |

Statistics (2025)
- Passengers: 891,860
- Aircraft movements: 12,789
- Cargo (metric tons): 732.1

Wanzhou Wuqiao Airport
- Simplified Chinese: 万州五桥机场
- Traditional Chinese: 萬州五橋機場
Transcriptions
Standard Mandarin
- Hanyu Pinyin: Wànzhōu Wǔqiáo Jīchǎng
Yue: Cantonese
- Jyutping: maan^{6}zau^{1} ng^{5}kiu^{4} gei^{1}coeng^{4}

Wanzhou Wuqiao Airport (IATA: WXN, ICAO: ZUWX) is an airport serving Wanzhou District of Chongqing, China. It is located 5 kilometres (3.1 mi) from the centre of Wanzhou. The airport was opened on 29 May 2003.

== History ==
Wanzhou was formerly served by the military Liangping Airport. Its runway was too short for civil use, but the plan to extend it was abandoned. Instead, the new Wuqiao Airport was built by cutting into mountains and filling bottomlands.

Wanzhou Airport was approved by the State Council and the Central Military Commission in November 1997, construction officially began in early 2000, and it was completed and opened to traffic on May 29, 2003.

In 2013, the first phase of the Wanzhou Wuqiao Airport expansion project was launched and completed in the same year.

Wanzhou District officially launched the construction of its open aviation port in June 2014, further strengthening the port's regional influence, improving international air passenger and cargo transport conditions in the Three Gorges Reservoir Area, and promoting the development of Chongqing as an inland hub of openness. The project was to add international and regional passenger‑flow facilities to the airport terminal began on March 1, 2015. After 45 days of work, construction was completed on April 15, with all equipment installed and tested. On April 21, the opening of the Wanzhou Airport aviation port passed expert inspection, and the relevant authorities carried out joint‑inspection procedures, civil aviation completion checks, and industry acceptance reviews. In 2015, the construction work was complete, and the airport met the requirements for handling international passengers. On the afternoon of April 27, the airport launched its first charter flight route to Hong Kong.

The second expansion and renovation project of the airport began in July 2017 and lasted three years, involving lighting engineering, runway extension, resurfacing of the original runway, and upgrades to navigation equipment and visual aids. On September 18, 2020, the flight procedure verification test flight of the expansion and renovation part of Wanzhou Airport passed the verification test flight.

On August 28, 2020, the new terminal building project (T2) was officially started. The project involved a total investment of approximately 510 million yuan, and the project increased the passenger handling capacity of the airport to 2.5 million passengers annually.

The runways of the airport were extended from 2400 meters to 2800 meters. On June 10, 2021, the installation and commissioning of the instrument landing system (ILS) and meteorological equipment for the newly extended runway were completed.

On June 16, 2022, the upgrade and renovation project of the ILS on runway 29 was officially put into use, marking Wanzhou Airport's entry into the era of dual ILS on its 2800-meter runway.

== Airlines and destinations ==
| Airlines | Destinations |
|---|---|
| Air China | Guangzhou |
| China Southern Airlines | Guangzhou |
| Chongqing Airlines | Wenzhou |
| Colorful Guizhou Airlines | Ningbo |
| Donghai Airlines | Shenzhen |
| GX Airlines | Changsha, Nanning |
| Shanghai Airlines | Shanghai–Pudong |
| Sichuan Airlines | Beijing–Capital, Kunming, Nanjing |
| Tianjin Airlines | Hangzhou, Huizhou, Urumqi |
| XiamenAir | Lanzhou, Xiamen |

== See also ==
- List of airports in China
- List of the busiest airports in China
