= Gmina Granowo =

Gmina Granowo Granowo Commune
- Gmina
- Location within Poland
- Coordinates (Granowo): 52°13′20″N 16°31′41″E
- Country: Poland
- Voivodeship: Greater Poland
- County: Grodzisk
- Seat: Granowo

Area
  - Total: 68.42 km^{2} (26.42 sq mi)

Population (2011)
  - Total: 5,042
  - Density: 73.69/km^{2} (190.9/sq mi)
- Website: www.granowo.bazagmin.pl

Gmina Granowo is a rural gmina (administrative district) in Grodzisk County, Greater Poland Voivodeship, in west-central Poland. Its seat is the village of Granowo, which lies approximately 12 kilometres (7 mi) east of Grodzisk Wielkopolski and 33 km (21 mi) south-west of the regional capital Poznań.

The gmina covers an area of 68.42 square kilometres (26.4 sq mi), and as of 2006 its total population is 4,921 (5,042 in 2011).

== Villages ==
Gmina Granowo contains the villages and settlements of Bielawy, Dalekie, Drużyn, Granówko, Granowo, Januszewice, Kotowo, Kubaczyn, Niemierzyce, Separowo, Strzępiń and Zemsko.

== Neighbouring gminas ==
Gmina Granowo is bordered by the gminas of Buk, Grodzisk Wielkopolski, Kamieniec, Opalenica and Stęszew.
