= Trzcinica, Gmina Wielichowo =

Trzcinica
- Village
- Location within Poland
- Coordinates: 52°9′N 16°24′E
- Country: Poland
- Voivodeship: Greater Poland
- County: Grodzisk
- Gmina: Wielichowo

Trzcinica [tʂt͡ɕiˈnit͡sa] is a village in the administrative district of Gmina Wielichowo, within Grodzisk County, Greater Poland Voivodeship, in west-central Poland.
