= Wola Jabłońska =

- Village
- Location within Poland
- Coordinates: 52°14′N 16°11′E
- Country: Poland
- Voivodeship: Greater Poland
- County: Grodzisk
- Gmina: Rakoniewice

Wola Jabłońska [ˈvɔla jaˈbwɔɲska] is a village in the administrative district of Gmina Rakoniewice, within Grodzisk County, Greater Poland Voivodeship, in west-central Poland.
