= Głodno, Gmina Rakoniewice =

Głodno
- Village
- Location within Poland
- Coordinates: 52°9′14″N 16°11′24″E
- Country: Poland
- Voivodeship: Greater Poland
- County: Grodzisk
- Gmina: Rakoniewice
- Population: 340

Głodno [ˈɡwɔdnɔ] is a village in the administrative district of Gmina Rakoniewice, within Grodzisk County, Greater Poland Voivodeship, in west-central Poland.
