= Lulin, Gmina Grodzisk Wielkopolski =

Lulin
- Settlement
- Location within Poland
- Coordinates: 52°12′56″N 16°25′10″E
- Country: Poland
- Voivodeship: Greater Poland
- County: Grodzisk
- Gmina: Grodzisk Wielkopolski
- Population: 23

Lulin [ˈlulin] is a settlement in the administrative district of Gmina Grodzisk Wielkopolski, within Grodzisk County, Greater Poland Voivodeship, in west-central Poland.
