= Gmina Grodzisk Wielkopolski =

Gmina Grodzisk Wielkopolski Grodzisk Wielkopolski Commune
- Gmina
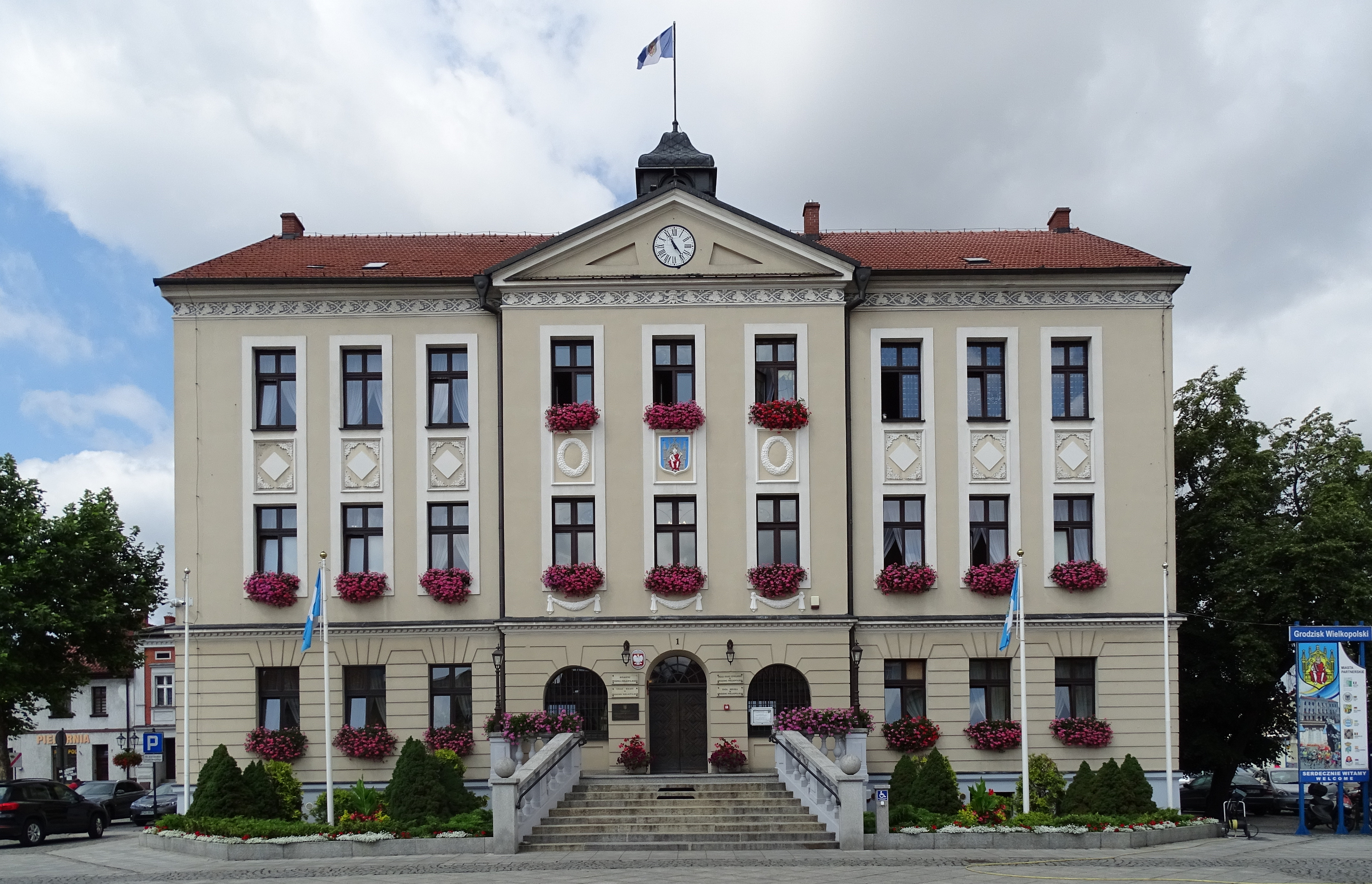
- Town Hall in Grodzisk Wielkopolski, seat of the gmina office

- Coat of arms
- Interactive map of Gmina Grodzisk Wielkopolski
- Coordinates (Grodzisk Wielkopolski): 52°14′N 16°22′E
- Country: Poland
- Voivodeship: Greater Poland
- County: Grodzisk
- Seat: Grodzisk Wielkopolski

Area
  - Total: 134.49 km^{2} (51.93 sq mi)

Population (2011)
  - Total: 19,296
  - Density: 143.48/km^{2} (371.60/sq mi)
  - Urban: 14,175
  - Rural: 5,121
- Time zone: UTC+1 (CET)
  - Summer (DST): UTC+2 (CEST)
- Vehicle registration: PGO
- Website: www.grodzisk.wlkp.pl

Gmina Grodzisk Wielkopolski is an urban-rural gmina (administrative district) in Grodzisk County, Greater Poland Voivodeship, in west-central Poland. Its seat is the town of Grodzisk Wielkopolski, which lies approximately 42 kilometres (26 mi) south-west of the regional capital Poznań.

The gmina covers an area of 134.49 square kilometres (51.9 sq mi), and as of 2006 its total population is 18,616 (out of which the population of Grodzisk Wielkopolski amounts to 13,703, and the population of the rural part of the gmina is 4,913).

== Villages ==
Apart from the town of Grodzisk Wielkopolski, Gmina Grodzisk Wielkopolski contains the villages and settlements of Albertowsko, Biała Wieś, Borzysław, Chrustowo, Czarna Wieś, Grąblewo, Kąkolewo, Kobylniki, Kurowo, Lasówki, Lulin, Ptaszkowo, Rojewo, Słocin, Snowidowo, Sworzyce, Woźniki and Zdrój.

== Neighbouring gminas ==
Gmina Grodzisk Wielkopolski is bordered by the gminas of Granowo, Kamieniec, Nowy Tomyśl, Opalenica and Rakoniewice.
