= Kamieniec, Gmina Kamieniec =

Kamieniec
- Village
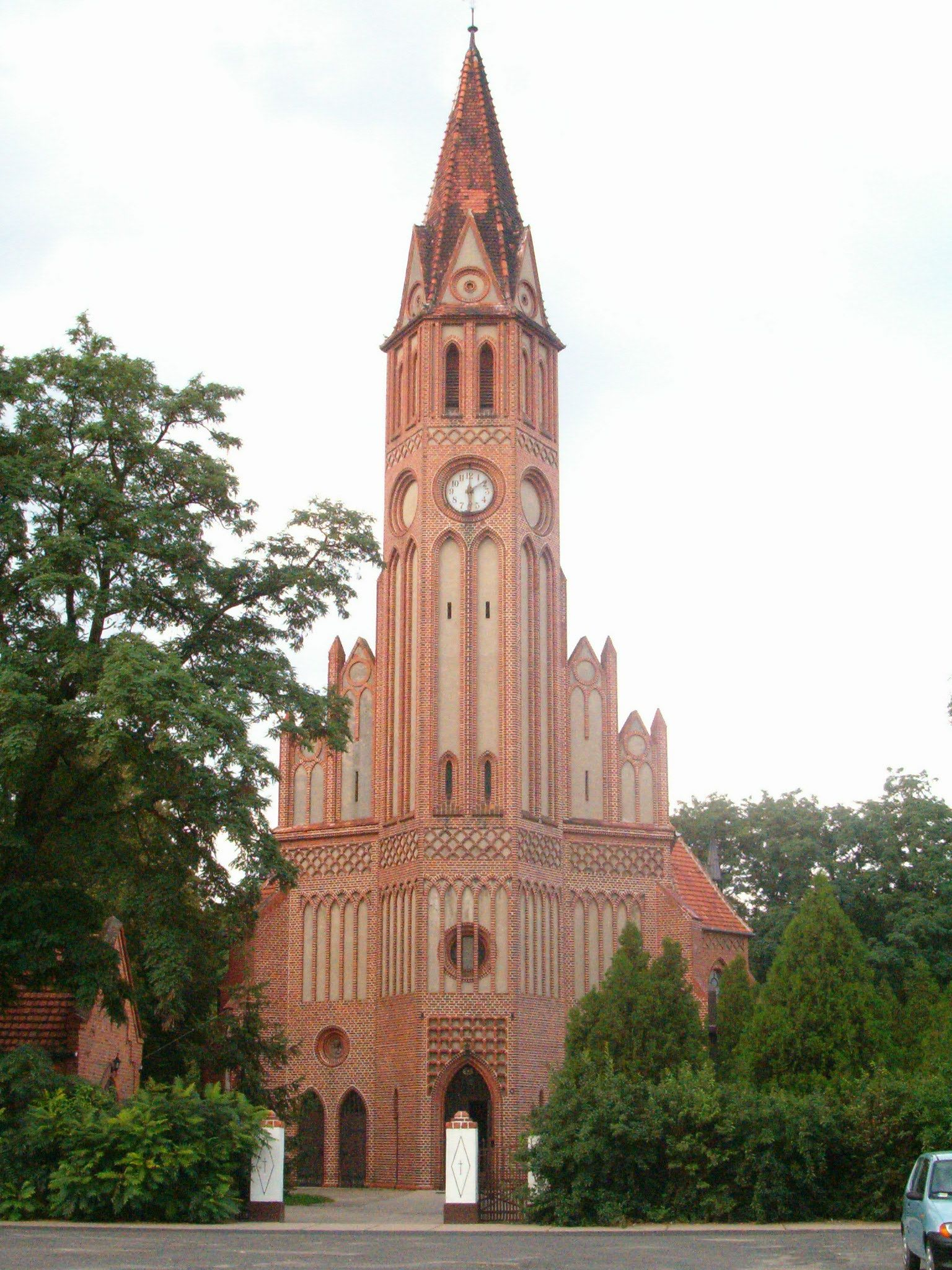
- Church of Saint Lawrence

- Location within Poland
- Coordinates: 52°10′N 16°28′E
- Country: Poland
- Voivodeship: Greater Poland
- County: Grodzisk
- Gmina: Kamieniec

Population
  - Total: 1,098

Kamieniec [kaˈmjɛɲɛt͡s] is a village in Grodzisk County, Greater Poland Voivodeship, in west-central Poland. It is the seat of the gmina (administrative district) called Gmina Kamieniec.
