= Gmina Kamieniec =

Gmina Kamieniec Kamieniec Commune
- Gmina
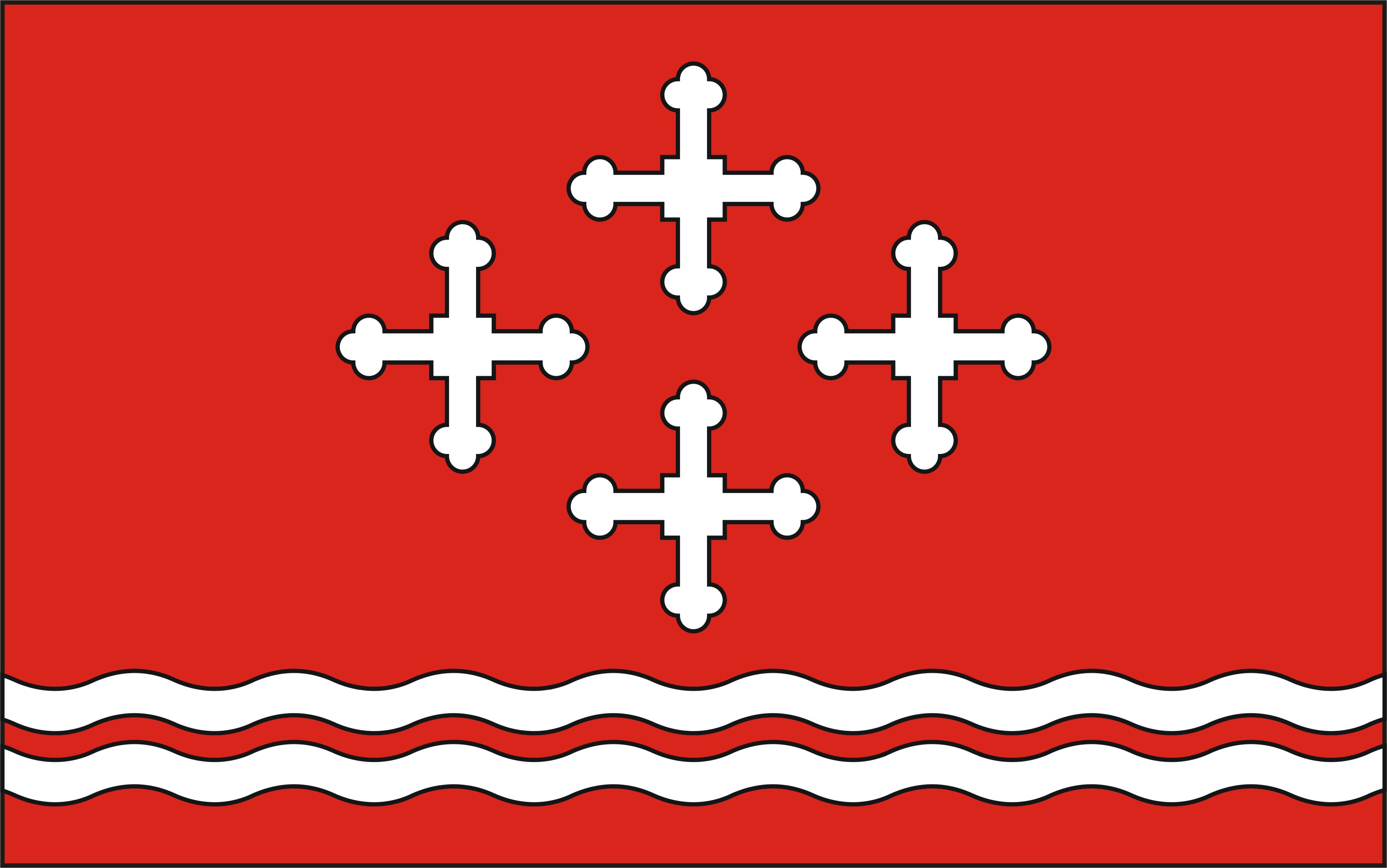
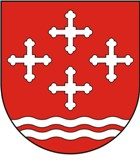
- Flag Coat of arms

- Location within Poland
- Coordinates (Kamieniec): 52°10′N 16°28′E
- Country: Poland
- Voivodeship: Greater Poland
- County: Grodzisk
- Seat: Kamieniec

Area
  - Total: 132.23 km^{2} (51.05 sq mi)

Population (2011)
  - Total: 6,532
  - Density: 49.40/km^{2} (127.9/sq mi)
- Website: www.kamieniec.pl

Gmina Kamieniec is a rural gmina (administrative district) in Grodzisk County, Greater Poland Voivodeship, in west-central Poland. Its seat is the village of Kamieniec, which lies approximately 11 kilometres (7 mi) south-east of Grodzisk Wielkopolski and 41 km (25 mi) south-west of the regional capital Poznań.

The gmina covers an area of 132.23 square kilometres (51.1 sq mi), and as of 2006 its total population is 6,498 (6,532 in 2011).

== Villages ==
Gmina Kamieniec contains the villages and settlements of Cykówiec, Cykówko, Cykowo, Doły, Goździchowo, Jaskółki, Kamieniec, Karczewo, Konojad, Kotusz, Kowalewo, Łęki Małe, Łęki Wielkie, Lubiechowo, Maksymilianowo, Parzęczewo, Plastowo, Płastowo, Puszczykówiec, Puszczykowo, Sepno, Szczepowice, Ujazd, Ujazd-Huby, Wąbiewo, Wilanowo and Wolkowo.

== Neighbouring gminas ==
Gmina Kamieniec is bordered by the gminas of Granowo, Grodzisk Wielkopolski, Kościan, Rakoniewice, Śmigiel, Stęszew and Wielichowo.
