= Komorówko, Greater Poland Voivodeship =

Komorówko
- Village
- Location within Poland
- Coordinates: 52°11′27″N 16°10′52″E
- Country: Poland
- Voivodeship: Greater Poland
- County: Grodzisk
- Gmina: Rakoniewice

Komorówko [kɔmɔˈrufkɔ] is a village in the administrative district of Gmina Rakoniewice, within Grodzisk County, Greater Poland Voivodeship, in west-central Poland.
