= Mokrzec, Gmina Wielichowo =

Mokrzec
- Settlement
- Location within Poland
- Coordinates: 52°8′50″N 16°21′3″E
- Country: Poland
- Voivodeship: Greater Poland
- County: Grodzisk
- Gmina: Wielichowo

Mokrzec [ˈmɔkʂɛt͡s] is a settlement in the administrative district of Gmina Wielichowo, within Grodzisk County, Greater Poland Voivodeship, in west-central Poland.
