= Rataje (Benešov District) =

- Municipality
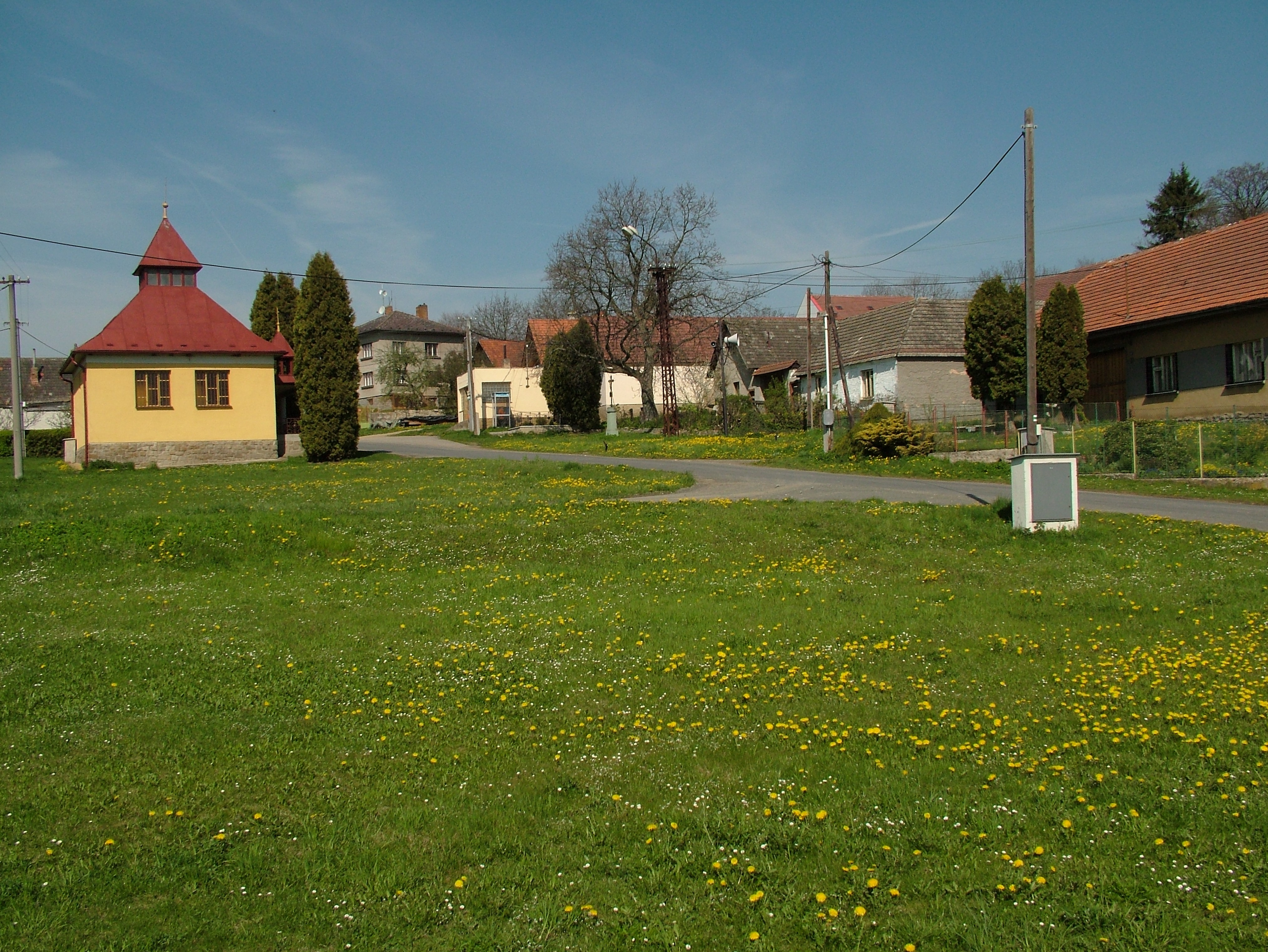
- Centre of Rataje

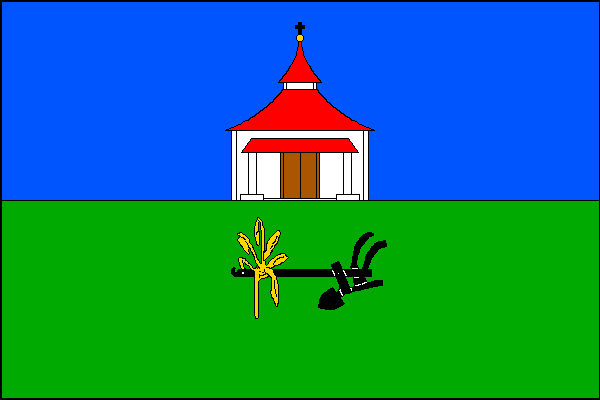
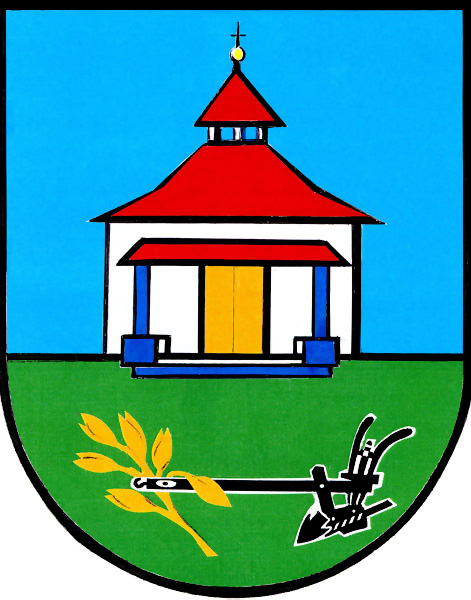
- Flag Coat of arms

- Location in the Czech Republic
- Coordinates: 49°42′15″N 14°58′14″E
- Country: Czech Republic
- Region: Central Bohemian
- District: Benešov
- First mentioned: 1395

Area
  - Total: 4.49 km^{2} (1.73 sq mi)
- Elevation: 444 m (1,457 ft)

Population (2026-01-01)
  - Total: 176
  - Density: 39.2/km^{2} (102/sq mi)
- Time zone: UTC+1 (CET)
  - Summer (DST): UTC+2 (CEST)
- Postal code: 258 01
- Website: www.obec-rataje.cz

Rataje is a municipality and village in Benešov District in the Central Bohemian Region of the Czech Republic. It has about 200 inhabitants.

== Etymology ==
The name is derived from the Old Czech word rataj, i.e. 'ploughman', 'farmer'.

== Demographics ==
Historical population
Year	Pop.	±%
1869	352	—
1880	311	−11.6%
1890	307	−1.3%
1900	330	+7.5%
1910	294	−10.9%
1921	293	−0.3%
1930	260	−11.3%
1950	233	−10.4%
1961	259	+11.2%
1970	213	−17.8%
1980	197	−7.5%
1991	193	−2.0%
2001	189	−2.1%
2011	177	−6.3%
2021	161	−9.0%
Source: Censuses
