= Luling =

Luling may refer to:

== China ==
- Luling, Suzhou, Anhui, town in Yongqiao District, Suzhou, Anhui
- Luling (廬陵), old name for Ji'an in Jiangxi

== United States ==
- Luling, Louisiana
- Luling, Texas
  - Luling High School

== See also ==
- Günter Lüling (1928–2014), German theologian
