= Grodzisk County, Greater Poland Voivodeship =

Grodzisk County Powiat grodziski
- County
- Flag Coat of arms

- Location within the voivodeship
- Coordinates (Grodzisk Wielkopolski): 52°14′N 16°22′E
- Country: Poland
- Voivodeship: Greater Poland
- Seat: Grodzisk Wielkopolski
- Gminas: Total 5: Gmina Granowo; Gmina Grodzisk Wielkopolski; Gmina Kamieniec; Gmina Rakoniewice; Gmina Wielichowo

Area
  - Total: 643.72 km^{2} (248.54 sq mi)

Population (2006)
  - Total: 49,444
  - Density: 76.810/km^{2} (198.94/sq mi)
  - Urban: 18,721
  - Rural: 30,723
- Car plates: PGO
- Website: www.pgw.pl

Grodzisk County (Polish: powiat grodziski) is a unit of territorial administration and local government (powiat) in Greater Poland Voivodeship, west-central Poland. It came into being on January 1, 1999, as a result of the Polish local government reforms passed in 1998. Its administrative seat and largest town is Grodzisk Wielkopolski, which lies 42 kilometres (26 mi) south-west of the regional capital Poznań. The county also contains the towns of Rakoniewice, lying 13 km (8 mi) south-west of Grodzisk Wielkopolski, and Wielichowo, 13 km (8 mi) south of Grodzisk Wielkopolski.

The county covers an area of 643.72 square kilometres (248.5 sq mi). As of 2006 its total population is 49,444, out of which the population of Grodzisk Wielkopolski is 13,703, that of Rakoniewice is 3,253, that of Wielichowo is 1,765, and the rural population is 30,723.

== Neighbouring counties ==
Grodzisk County is bordered by Poznań County to the east, Kościan County to the south-east, Wolsztyn County to the south-west and Nowy Tomyśl County to the west.

== Administrative divisions ==
The county is subdivided into five gminas (three urban-rural and two rural). These are listed in the following table, in descending order of population.

Gmina	Type	Area (km^{2})	Population (2006)	Seat
Gmina Grodzisk Wielkopolski	urban-rural	134.5	18,616	Grodzisk Wielkopolski
Gmina Rakoniewice	urban-rural	201.2	12,515	Rakoniewice
Gmina Wielichowo	urban-rural	107.4	6,894	Wielichowo
Gmina Kamieniec	rural	132.2	6,498	Kamieniec
Gmina Granowo	rural	68.4	4,921	Granowo
