= Błociszewski family with Ostoja coat of arms =

Polish medieval CoA Ostoja

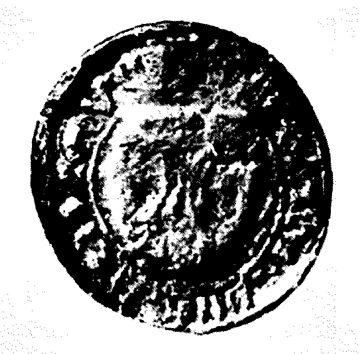
Seal of Jakusz from Blociszewo, Ostoja coat of arms

The Błociszewski family - a Polish noble family with the coat of arms of Ostoja, belonging to the heraldic Clan Ostoja (Moscics), originating from Błociszewo in the former of Kościan district of Poznań voivodeship. From the Błociszewskis of the Ostoja CoA come: Brodnicki, Bytkowski, Gajewski, Lubiatowski, Ptaszkowski, Szczodrowki.

== The oldest source certificates concerning the family ==
Listed below are selected source certificates concerning the Błociszewskis of the Ostoja coat of arms from the middle of the 14th century to the beginning of the 15th century.

- The oldest mention of the village and a representative of the Błociszewski family, Ostoja coat of arms comes from 1358 and concerns Jakusz of Błociszewo, who appeared as a witness in the document of Father Jan, abbot of Lubin.
- Jakusz of Błociszewo also appears twice in the years 1364-1369 as the voivode of the Lviv township.
- The image of the seal of Jakusz from Błociszewo from 1370, showing the coat of arms of Ostoja and the inscription on its rim: S. IACUSSI, is known. DE. BLOCISZEWO. The document with the seal was in 1938 in the Archives of the city of Lviv.
- In 1393, Mirosz from Błociszewo, who lost the trial with Jan Chaławski for Chyrzyna, performed.
- Świętomir Błociszewski, heir in Brodnica, came from Błociszewo in 1395. He appeared in the town and land registers of Kościan and Poznań until 1407.
- In 1399 Dzierżek Błociszewski was mentioned, who lost the trial for horses to Piechno Krakwicz from Karchów.
- In the years 1399-1400 Mikołaj and Dobrogost from Błociszewo conducted court disputes with brothers Pietrasz and Jakub Gorzecki from Górka over Roszkowo (near Miejska Górka).
- Mikołaj of Błociszewo also appeared in 1402, when he bequeathed to the vicars of the Poznań cathedral 2 pennies of rent from the sum of 25 fines in Błociszewo. In 1405, he won the trial for a part of Rąbinia in connection with the care of the minors - Elżbieta and Pietrasz from Rąbin.
- In 1408 the heirs of the village, Jan and Mikołaj Błociszewski founded the church of St. Michael the Archangel, who was erected by the bishop of Poznań - Wojciech from the Jastrzębie family. There were two family chapels in the temple - the Błociszewski and the Krzyżanowski family chapels. The church was built with the inhabitants of the surrounding villages in mind: Gaj, Wronowa, Krzyżanowa. This church was then secured with rent in Błociszewo and Wronowo and in Bytkowo, a village belonging to Dobrogost from Błociszewo.

== The estates belonging to the family ==
Listed below are the most important lands belonging to the Błociszewskis, Ostoja coat of arms.

Błociszewo, Brodnica, Rąbiń, Luboń, Grabianowo, Wronowo, Szczodrowo, Krajkowo, Marszewo, Ptaszkowo, Chaławy, Gaj, Lubiatowo, Witów, Konarzew, Rogowo, Ciołkowo, Smogorzewo, Mnichy, Tuczępy, Miłostowo, Szczepowice, Łagiewniki, Sepno, Młodzikowo, Paruszewo.

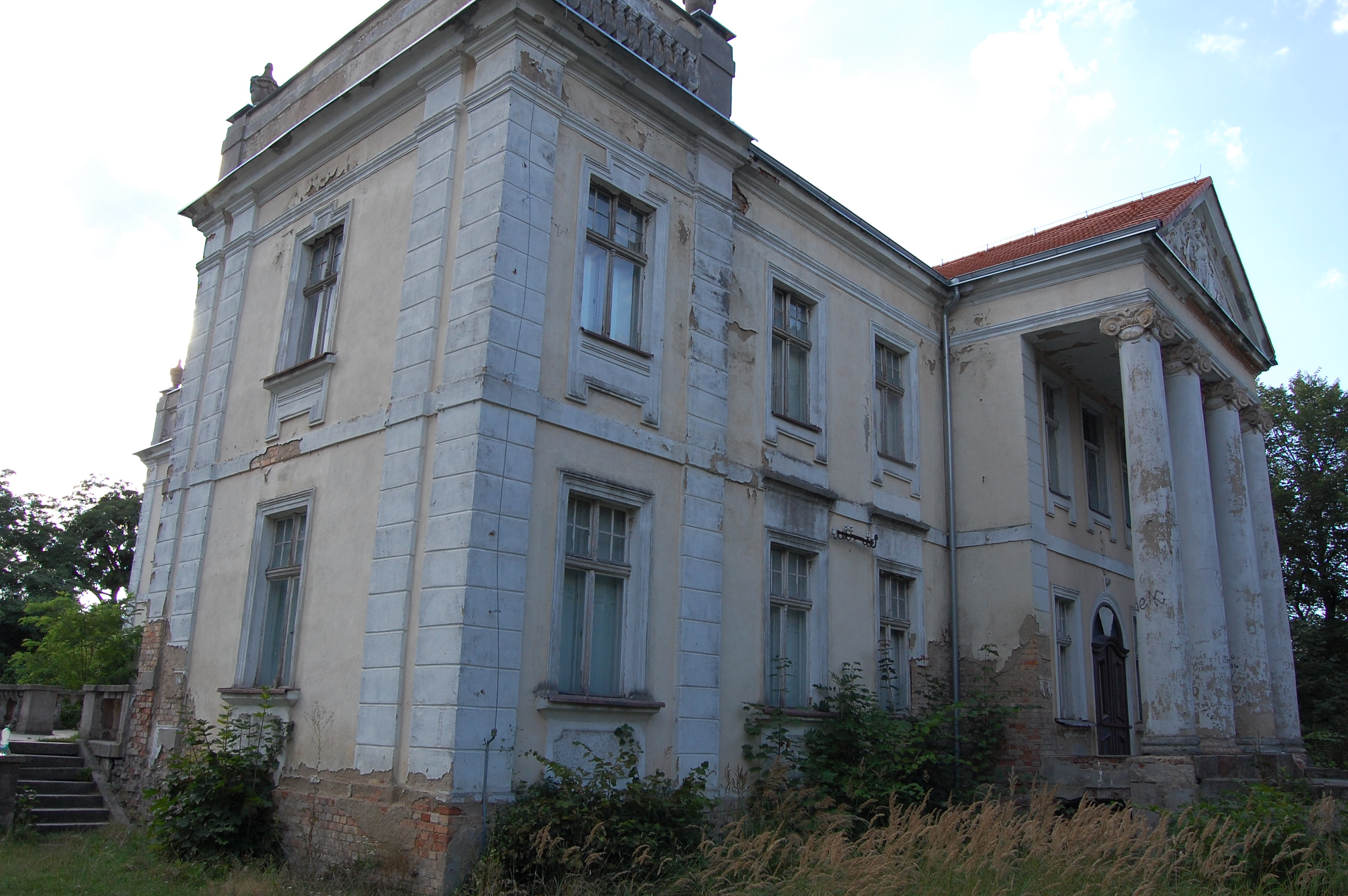
Pałace in Paruszewe, property of the Błociszewski family, Ostoja CoA

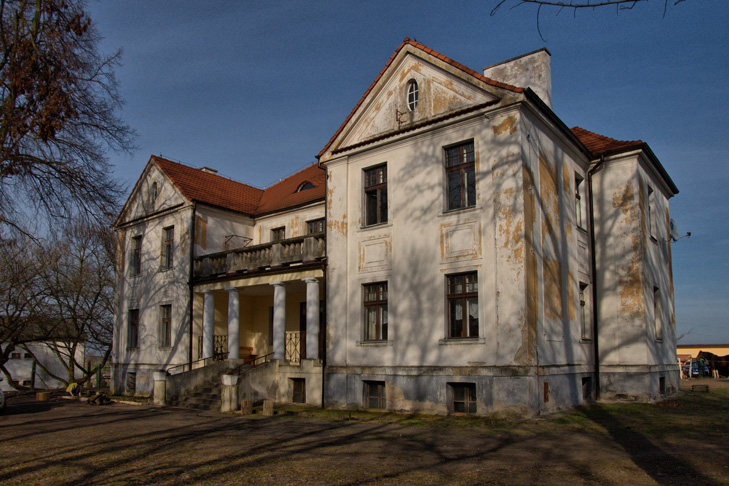
Młodzikowo, the palace of Tadeusz Błociszewski, Ostoja CoA

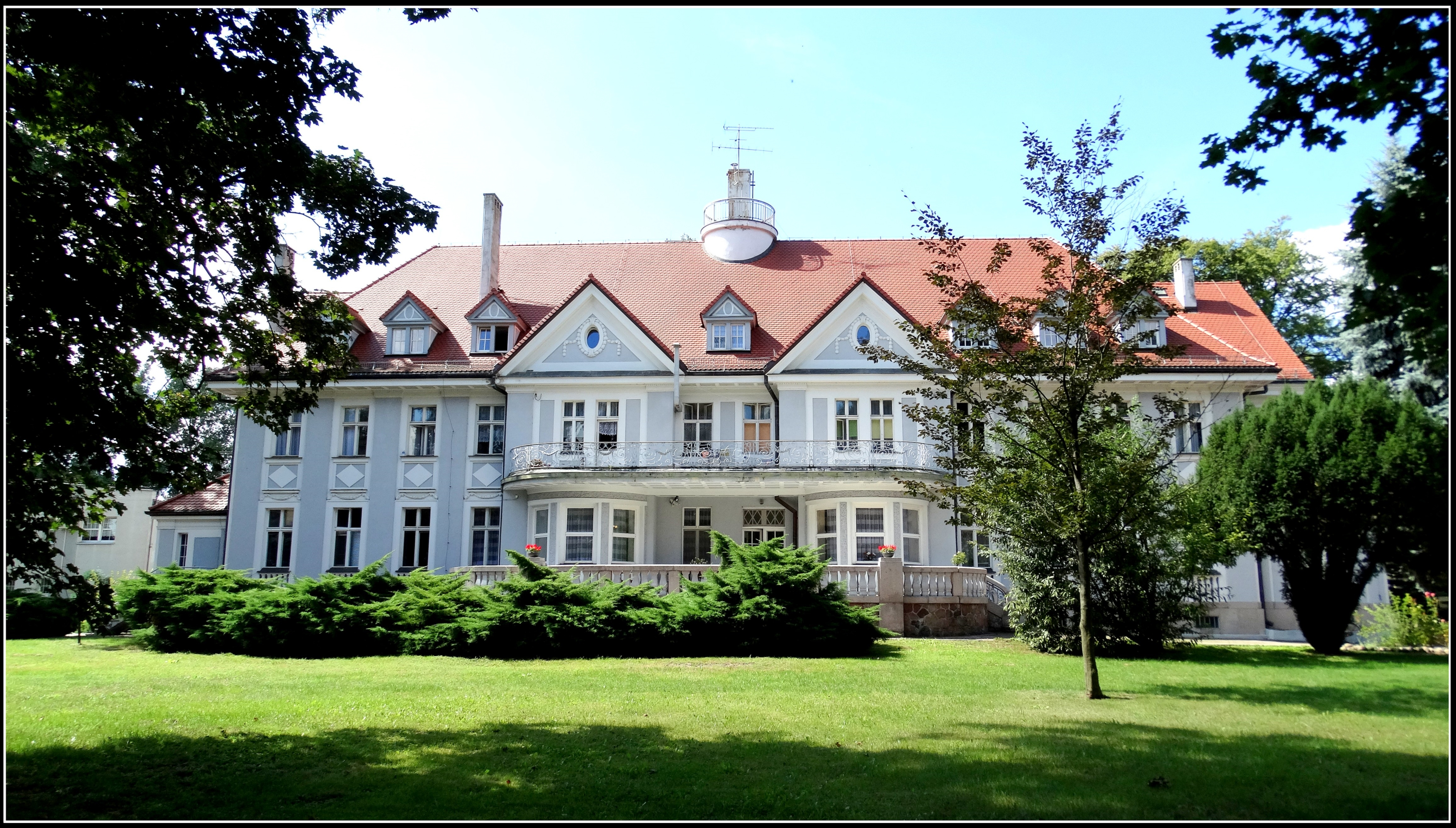
Pałace in Rogow, property of Mateusz Błociszewski, Ostoja CoA

== Family representatives ==
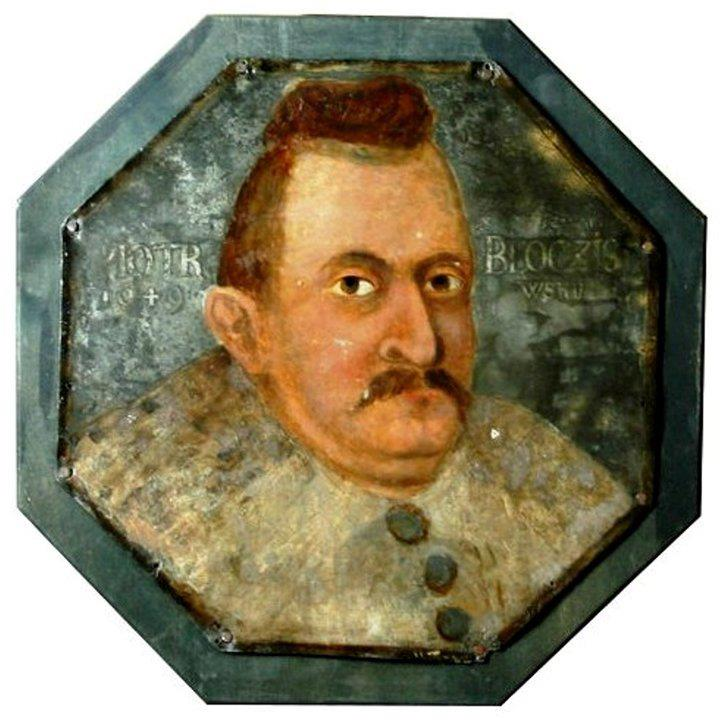
Piotr Błociszewski (died before 1649), heir of Błociszewo

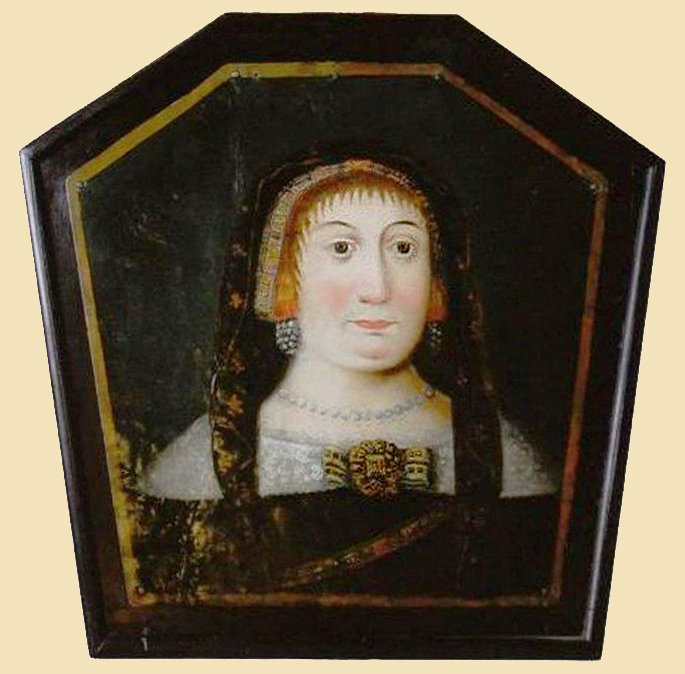
Katarzyna Błociszewska née Bukowieckie

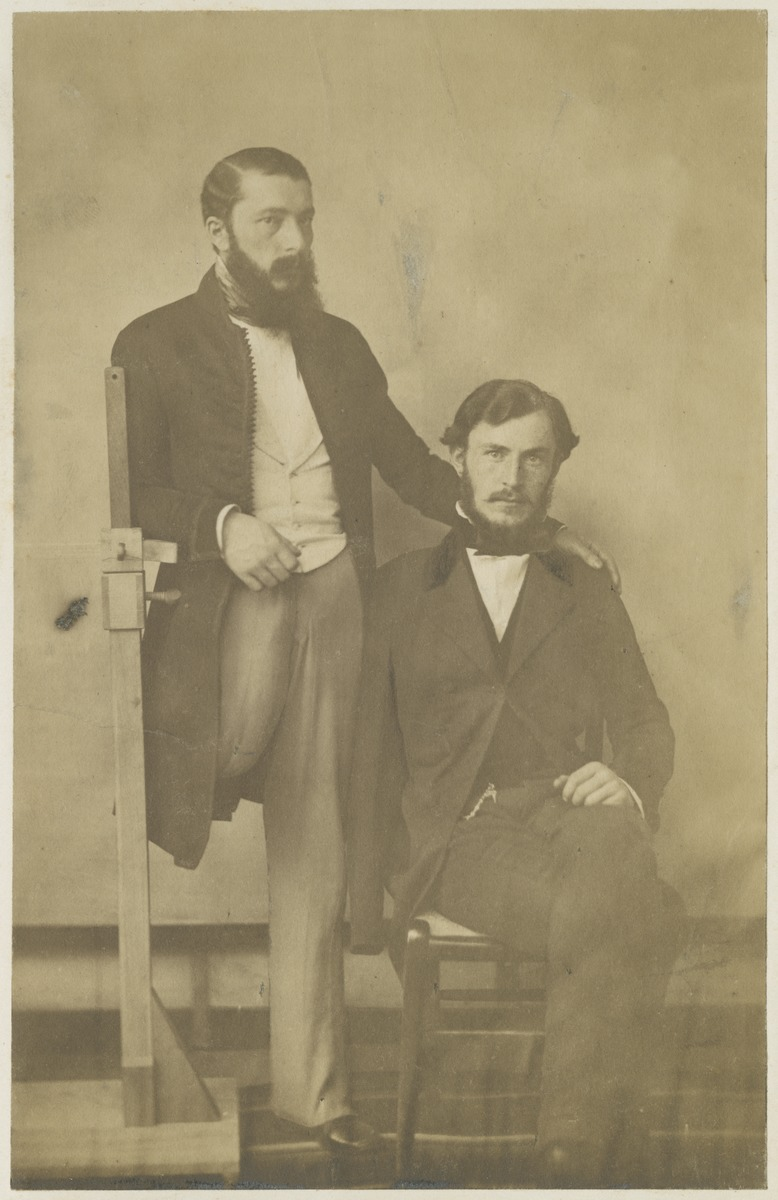
Kazimierz and Tadeusz Błociszewski, Greater Poland insurgents of 1848

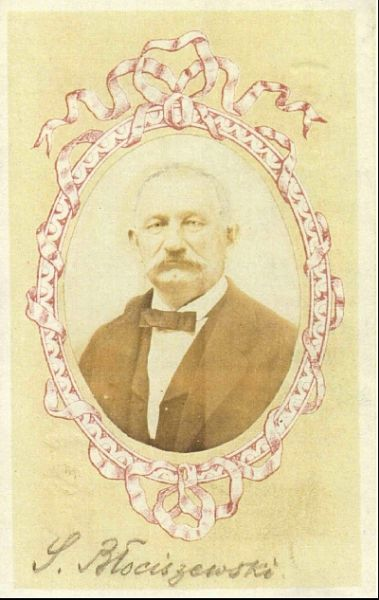
Stanisław Błociszewski (1804-1888), participant in the November Uprising

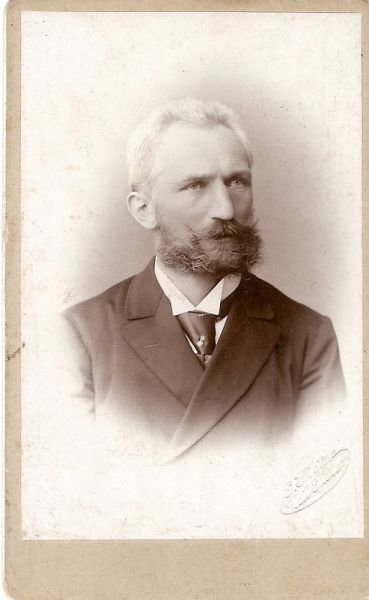
Stanisław Błociszewski (1849-1927), doctor of medicine

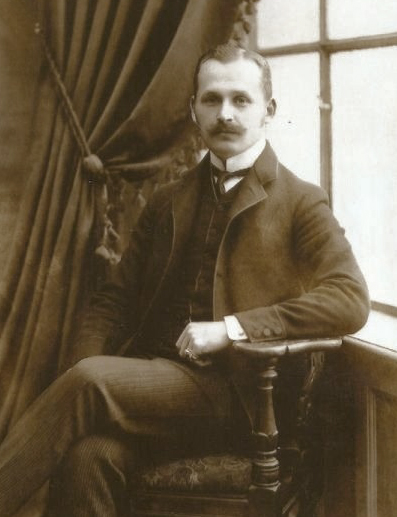
Tadeusz Błociszewski (1878-1934), owner of Młodzików, doctor of law

- Jakusz of Błociszewo (died after 1370) - heir of Błociszewo, voivode of the Lviv town.
- Świętomir of Błociszewo (died before 1408) - heir of Brodnica and Błociszewo.
- Dobrogost Bytkowski from Błociszewo (died before 1413) - heir of some of the properties of Błociszewo, Bytkowo and Luboń, assessor of the Poznań court.
- Mikołaj of Błociszewo (died 1419) - heir of Błociszew, Brodnica and Grabianów, court knight and envoy of Władysław Jagiełło for negotiations with the Teutonic Knights, castellan of Santocki (1401–1415), Poznań land judge (1415–1419).
- Jan of Błociszewo (died after 1429) - heir of estates in Brodnica, Błociszewo, Wronów, Grabianów and others.
- Maciej Szczodrowski from Błociszewo (died after 1440) - heir of Brodnica and Wronów, owner of Szczodrow in Wielkopolska.
- Andrzej Brodnicki of Błociszewo (died before 1452) - heir of Brodnica, owner of Luboń, Krajków, Marszewo and others, vice-ruler of Kościan (1440-1445), burgrave of Kościan (1447-1448), vice-voivode of Kościan in 1448.
- Jan Brodnicki from Błociszewo (died after 1470) - the heir of Grabianów in Greater Poland, he wrote from Brodnica.
- Mikołaj Ptaszkowski from Błociszewo (died before 1471) - heir of Brodnica, owner of Ptaszków in Greater Poland, deputy vice-provincial chambers of Kościan.
- Mikołaj of Błociszewo (died before 1499) - heir of Błociszewo, Chaławy, Gaj and Grabianów, burgrave of Kościan.
- Piotr Lubiatowski from Błociszewo (died before 1511) - heir of the estates in Błociszewo, Lubiatowie Większym and Mączlin.
- Jan of Błociszewo (died after 1512) - priest, notary of the Poznań consistory (1474), Lubin parson (1496-1512), parish priest in Nowe Miasto (1487), heir in Błociszewo, Lubiatów and Mączlin. He was the son of Stanisław and Apolonia Lubiatowska. He sued with the abbot of the Bernardine monastery in Lubiń for a forest called Struga Plebańska.
- Wincenty Gajewski from Błociszewo (died before 1564) - heir of Gaj and Grabianów and part of Błociszewo. As the first of the Błociszewskis, Gaj began to write as Gajewski from his estate, giving rise to a family of this surname.
- Piotr Błociszewski (died before 1649) - heir of Błociszewo, part of the villages of Mnichy, Tuczępy and Miłostowo. He was the son of Stanisław and Katarzyna née Iłowiecka. In 1621, he bought a part in Błociszewo from Jan Błociszewski (his cousin) for 9,000 zlotys. He married Jadwiga Prusimska, to whom he had a dowry of 3500 zlotys in 1626. In 1640 he bought from Piotr Urbanowski and his sister Barbara Karsznicka for 3606 zlotys parts of the villages of Mnichy, Tuczapy and Miłostowo in the district of Poznań.
- Katarzyna Błociszewska (died after 1691) - daughter of Jakub, co-owner of Błociszewo and Marianna Kędzierzyńska, in the years 1691-1697 she was the wife of Antoni Orłowski, a Żupnik from Dobrzyń.
- Stanisław Błociszewski (died before 1698) - the owner of several villages: Mnichy, Tuczępy, Miłostowo, Piotrowo, some in Poniec and adjacent villages. He was the son of Piotr and Jadwiga Prusimska. He married Katarzyna Bukowicka, daughter of Stanisław and Marianna Kierska. He wrote down a mutual life sentence with her in 1664 and framed her dowry of 15,333 zlotys in half of the villages of Mnichy, Tuczępy and Miłostowo. Stanisław and Katarzyna Bukowiecka had died in 1698.
- Ludwika Błociszewska (died before 1688) - daughter of Stanisław and Katarzyna Bukowiecka. She was the wife of Wojciech Sczaniecki, and then Wojciech Pruszak Bieniewski, a teacup from Latyczów.
- Franciszek Błociszewski (1671-1743) - priest, Jesuit, professor of ethics, mathematics, philosophy, canon law, positive, polemic and scholastic theology, prefect of studies in Kalisz (1718-1720) and Krakow (1720-1721) and rector of Jesuit colleges in : Krosno (1721-1724), Sandomierz (1726-1727), Toruń (1729-1732) and Jarosław (1739-1742). He was the son of Stanisław and Katarzyna Bukowiecka, heirs of the villages of Mnichy, Tuczępy and Miłostowo. It was mentioned by Kasper Niesiecki in "Polish Herbarz".
- Jan Józef Błociszewski (born 1701) - priest, regular canon of the Lateran convent of Czerwińsk. He was the son of Franciszek and Konstancja Smigielska, owners of the Szczepowice, parts of Łagiewniki and Sepna.
- Helena Błociszewska (died after 1759) - a nun at Tereski's in Poznań (she performed under the name of Agnieszka of the Holy Cross), daughter of Kazimierz and Ludwika Bielawska.
- Franciszek Błociszewski (died 1781) - heir of Błociszewo, head of Grójec, Poznań voivode, ensign of Żytomierz, son of Łukasz and Anna Śmigielska. With his wife Wiktoria Drzewicka, on the royal consensus of July 13, 1748, he transferred the head of Grójec and the mayor's office in Grójec to Franciszek Załuski. He died on September 19, 1781.
- Ignacy Błociszewski (1728-1768) - heir of the Witów and Konarzew estates in the voivodeship Łęczyca, a servant and chamberlain of King Augustus III. He was the son of Franciszek Błociszewski and Wiktoria Drzewicka. He married Katarzyna Szpotańska. He died childless on May 16, 1768, and was buried with the Franciscans in Śrem.
- Tadeusz Błociszewski (died 1807) - heir of the Witów and Konarzew estates, major general of the Crown troops (1766-1790), Member of the Four-Year Sejm, knight of the Order of St. Stanislaus. He was the son of Franciszek Błociszewski and Wiktoria Drzewicka.
- Stanisław Leonard Błociszewski (born 1795) - major of the Polish army, son of Tadeusz, served in the army of the Duchy of Warsaw (1812-1814). In 1831 he participated in and co-organized the uprising in the Łęczyca region. His spouse was Anna Manugiewicz, with whom he had sons - Kazimierz and Tadeusz Alojzy Stanisław.
- Mateusz Mikołaj Błociszewski (1766-1849) - heir of Ciołków, Rogów, tenant of Głuchów, insurgent from Kościuszko. He was the son of Augustyn and Anna Wilczyńska. He got married three times - with Jadwiga Parczewska, Barbara Pruska and Tekla Rudnicka. Mateusz died in 1849 in Smogoriewo with his son Stanisław.
- Stanisław Błociszewski (1804-1888) - heir of Ciołków, Rogów, Smogorzewa and Sobiesiernia, officer, November insurgent, January insurgent, received the golden cross of Virtuti Militari. He was the son of Mateusz and Barbara née Prussia. His sons, Władysław and Sylwester, also took part in the January Uprising. Sylwester fought in the unit of general Edmund Taczanowski and after the fall of the uprising, he was arrested and imprisoned in the Poznań citadel. Stanisław and Władysław Błociszewski were on the list of those accused of high treason in the so-called in the Berlin trial of 1864 (eventually the Prussians acquitted them).
- Kazimierz Błociszewski (1823-1878) - Greater Poland insurgent of 1848, historian, author of the four-volume "Universal History for Learning Youth". He took an active part in the life of the émigré community. He was a board member of the Worship and Bread Institution and the Scientific Aid Society. He was the son of Stanisław Leonard and Anna Manugiewicz. He married Anna Beamont. He died on May 23, 1878, in Paris.
- Tadeusz Alojzy Stanisław Błociszewski (1830-1899) - Greater Poland insurgent in 1848 (he lost his arm in the battle of Książ). He emigrated to France, where he taught German at the University of Paris. He was the son of Stanisław Leonard and Anna née Manugiewicz. He died in Brévannes (Seine-et-Oise) on August 6, 1899.
- Bronisław Paweł Błociszewski (1838-1913) - Major of the 3rd Prussian Uhlans, decorated with the Crown with Swords for the War of 1870 and with the Iron Cross. He was the son of Stanisław and Józefa Wyganowska. He died on May 28, 1913.
- Stanisław Błociszewski (1849-1927) - doctor of medicine, son of Stanisław Błociszewski and Józefa née Wyganowska. His wife was Jadwiga Bojanowska, with whom he had sons Tadeusz and Stanisław. He died on September 6, 1927, in Paruszewo and was buried in the parish cemetery in Skarboszewo.
- Tadeusz Błociszewski (1878-1934) - owner of Młodzików, doctor of laws, voivodship counselor in Poznań, long-term chairman of the Regional Appeals Committee. He was the son of Stanisław and Jadwiga née Bojanowska. He married Emilia Arendt, daughter of Kazimierz and Helena Pelagia Adamska. He died as a pensioner in Poznań on April 18, 1934.

== See also ==
- Ostoja CoA
- Clan Ostoja (Moscics)
- Church in Błociszewo
- Gajewski CoA Ostoja

== Bibliography ==
- Teki Dworzaczka. Materiały historyczno-genealogiczne do dziejów szlachty wielkopolskiej XV-XX w., Biblioteka Kórnicka PAN, Kórnik-Poznań 1995-2019 - Teki Dworzaczka.
- T. Jurek (red.), Słownik historyczno-geograficzny ziem polskich w średniowieczu, Instytut Historii Polskiej Akademii Nauk, 2010-2019, Poznań, część I, s. 63-65.
- K. Niesiecki, Herbarz polski, wyd. J.N. Bobrowicz, Lipsk 1839-1845, t. II, s. 169.
- A. Boniecki, Herbarz polski, Warszawa 1899, t. I, s. 290-291.
- S. Uruski, Rodzina. Herbarz szlachty polskiej, Warszawa 1904, t. I, s. 236.
- R. Kalinowski, Protoheraldyczny znak na portalu kościoła w Wysocicach a historia herbu Ostoja w średniowieczu, Rocznik Polskiego Towarzystwa Heraldycznego nowej serii, t. XV (XXVI).
- Z. Cieplucha, Z przeszłości ziemi Kościańskiej, Kościan 1929.
