= Gajewski family with Ostoja coat of arms =

Polish medieval CoA Ostoja

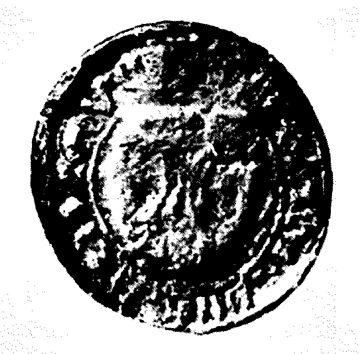
Seal of Jakusz from Blociszewo, Ostoja coat of arms

The Gajewski family - a Polish noble family with the coat of arms of Ostoja, belonging to the heraldic Clan Ostoja (Moscics), derived from the Błociszewski family, Ostoja coat of arms from Błociszewo in the former of Kościan district of Poznań voivodeship. The Gajewski family took their surname from the village of Gaj, located, like Błociszewo, in the former of Kościan district of the Poznań voivodeship, which they had owned since 1475.

== The oldest source certificates concerning the family ==
Listed below are selected source certificates concerning the Gajewski family of the Ostoja coat of arms and the nest villages of Błociszewo and Gaj until the mid-16th century.

- The oldest mention of the village of Błociszewo and a representative of the Błociszewski family, Ostoja coat of arms comes from 1358 and concerns Jakusz of Błociszewo, who appeared as a witness in the document of Father Jan, abbot of Lubin.
- The oldest mention of the village of Gaj comes from 1401 and concerns the sons of Janusz from Jarogniewice, who were in a dispute with Andrzej's widow from the village of Kowalskie and her sons about the villages of Szewce, Gaj and half of Marszewo.
- The oldest mention of a representative of the Ostoja family, who owned the village of Gaj, dates back to 1475, when Mikołaj of Błociszewo, burgrave of Kościan, bought the village of Gaj from Abraham Kiebijowski for 600 fines.
- In 1496, Piotr Błociszewski, son of Mikołaj, bequeathed 100 Hungarian zlotys to his wife Małgorzata, daughter of Wincenty Strzępiński, and a dowry in half of the Grove. Piotr had two sons, Jakub and Vincent, mentioned in 1499.
- In 1510 it was reported that the village of Gaj, belonging to the Błociszewski family, was deserted.
- In the years 1520–62, the village of Gaj was owned by Wincenty Błociszewski, son of Piotr and Małgorzata Strzępińska, who rebuilt the desolate village of Gaj and made it his headquarters, from which he began to write as Gajewski.

== The estates belonging to the family ==
Listed below are the most important lands belonging to the Gajewski family with Ostoja CoA.

Błociszewo, Brodnica, Grabianowo, Gaj, Czacz, Gorzyce, Gorzyczki, Przysieka Polska, Głuchowo, Luciny, Zadory, Roszkowo, Nietrzanowo, Witkówki, Słonin, Śląskowo, Rydzyna, Góra, Wolsztyn, Berzyna, Komorowo, Tłoki, Turzno, Piątkowo, Wałycz.

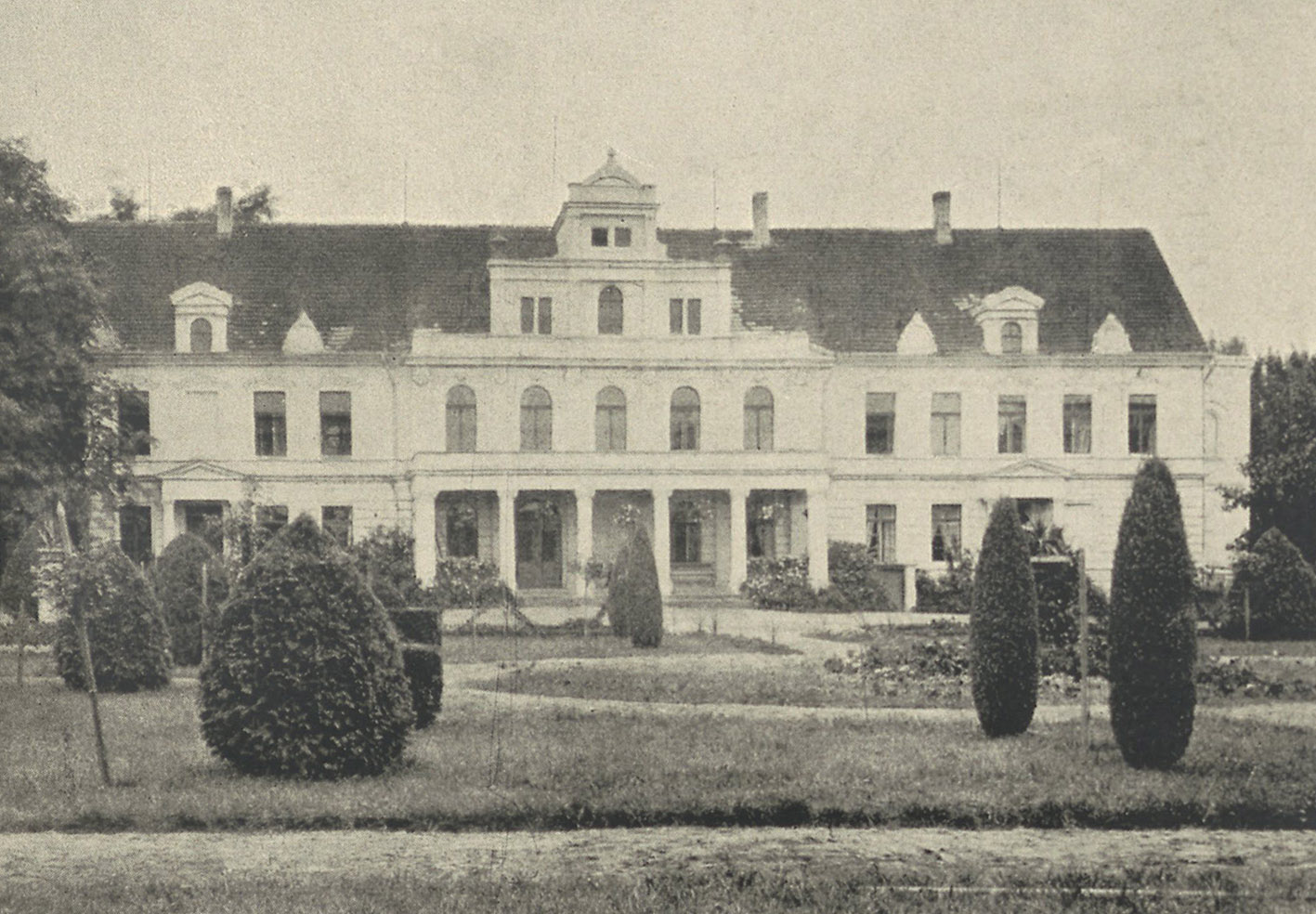
Wolsztyński Palace, property of Apolinary Gajewski, before reconstruction.

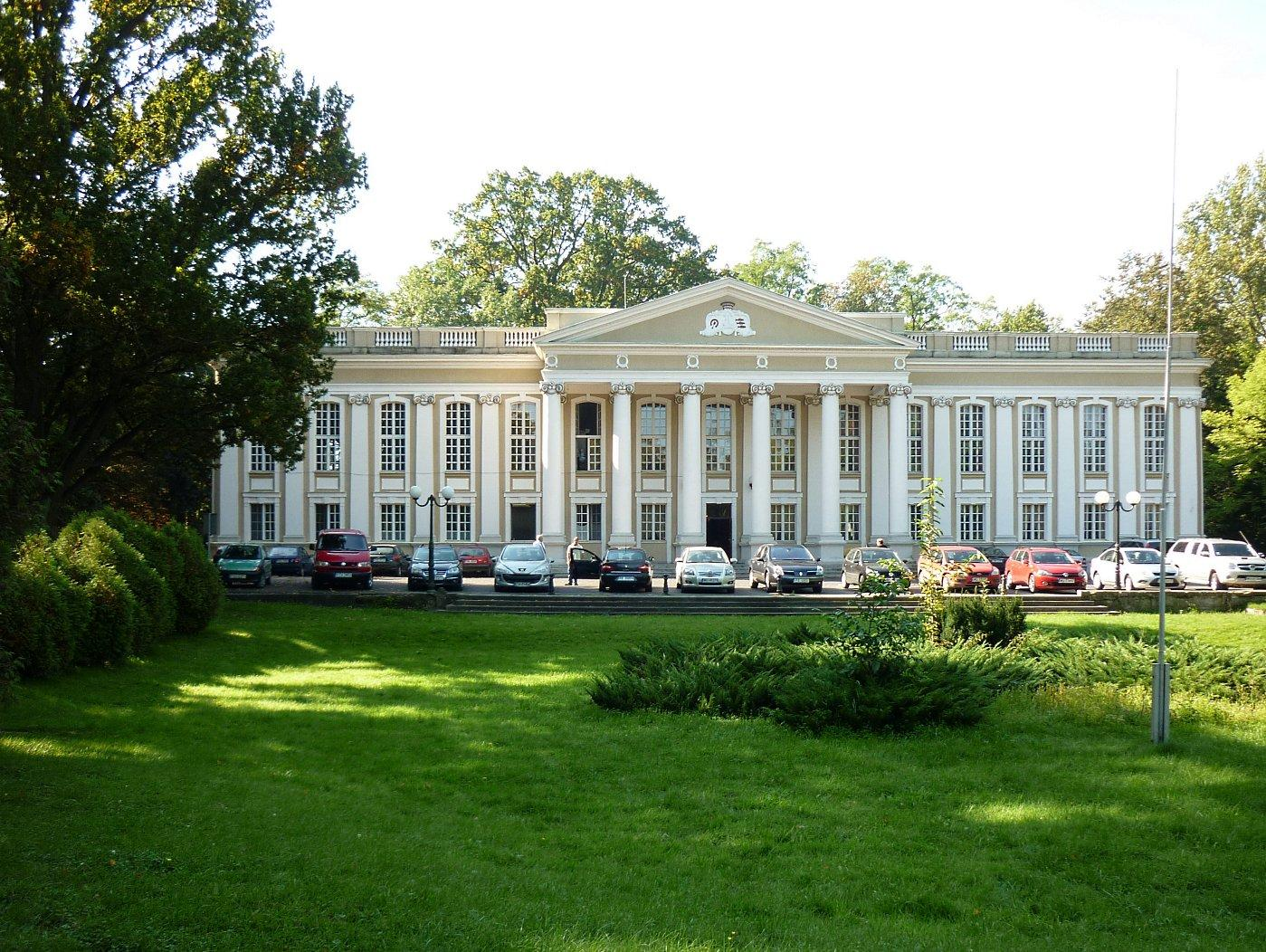
Wolsztyn Palace in 2010.

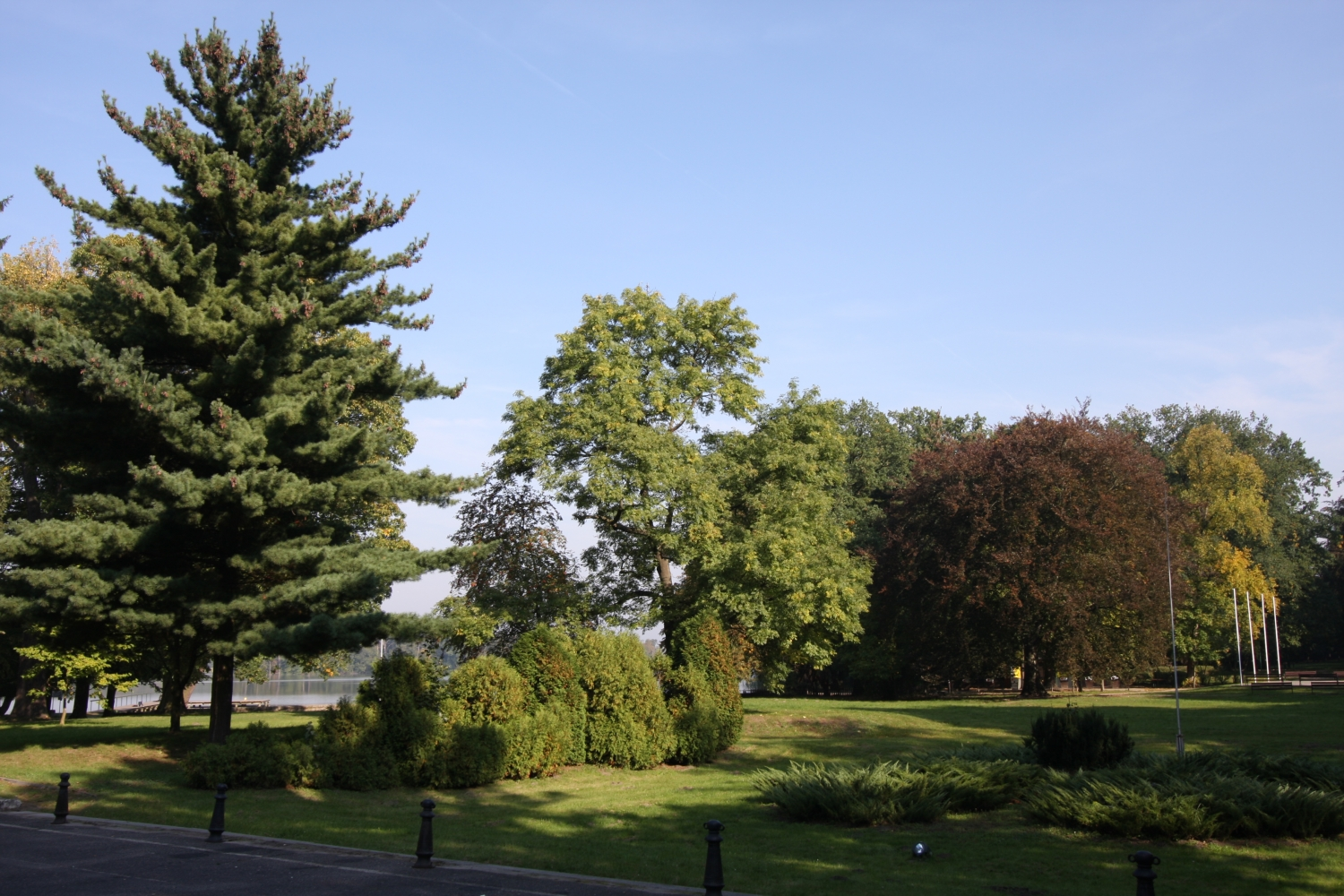
Park by the palace in Wolsztyn.

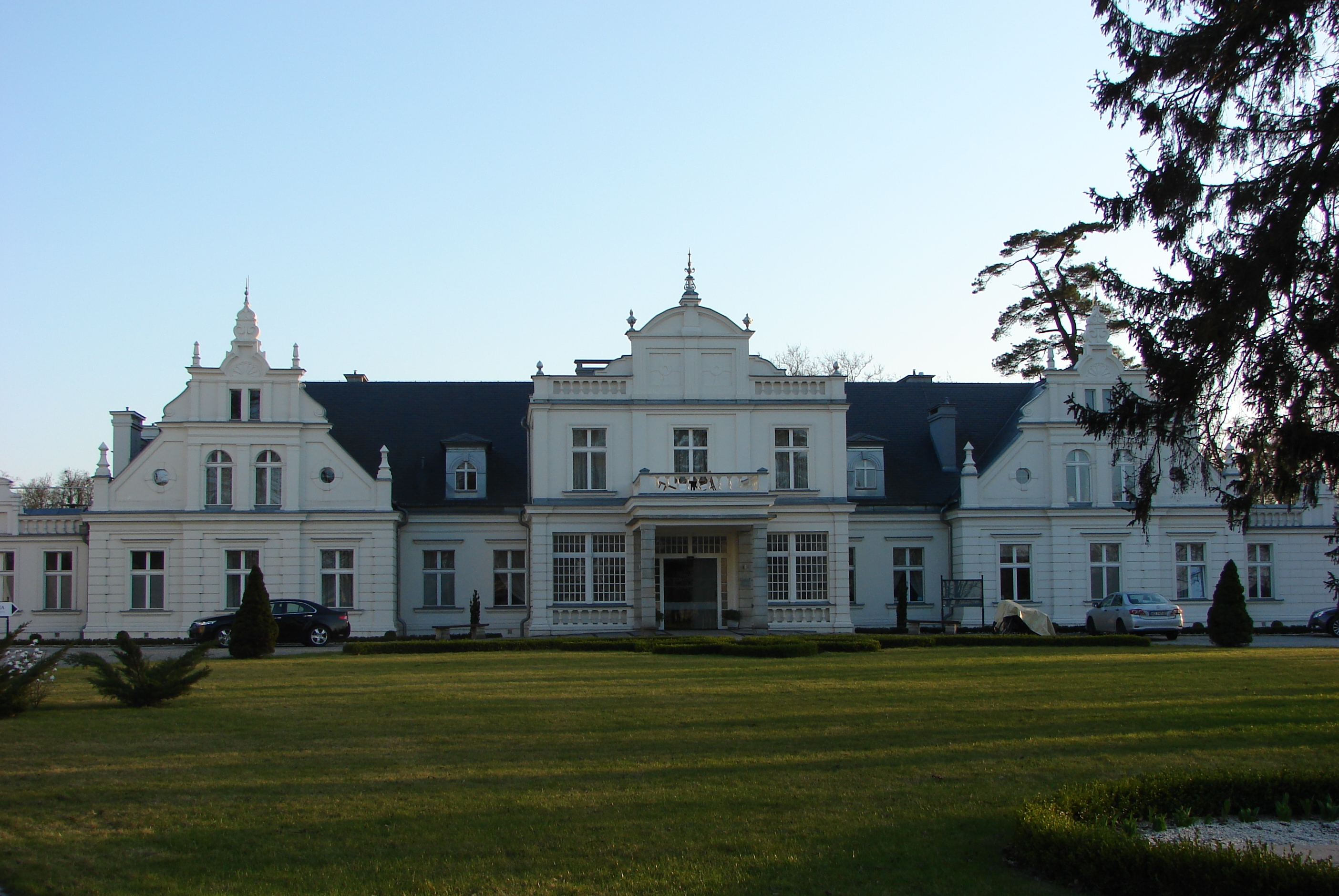
Palace in Turzno, property of Władysław Gajewski, grandson of Col. Franciszek Gajewski

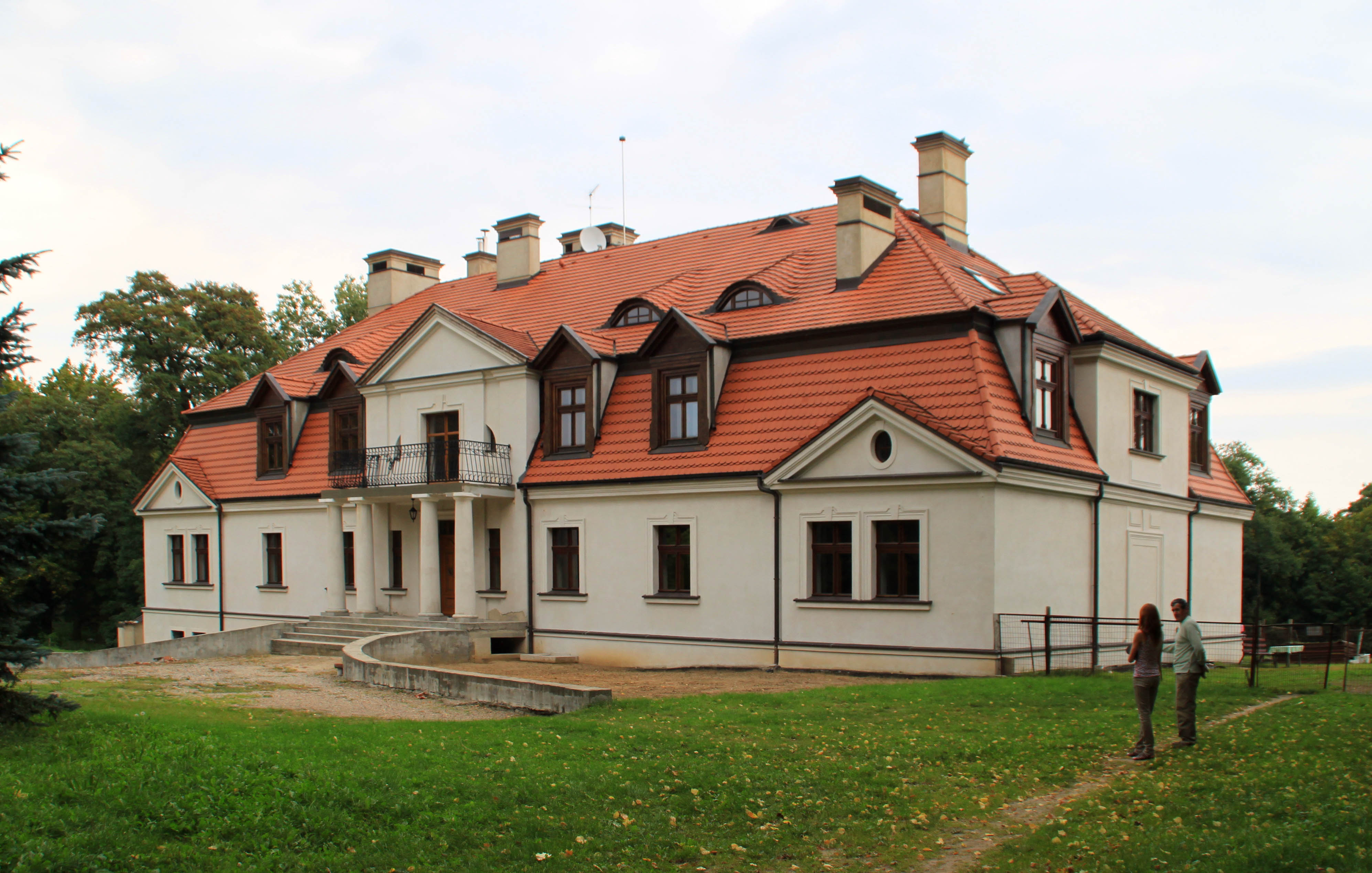
A baroque mansion in Góra built at the end of the 18th century by the Gajewski family, rebuilt in the 19th century.

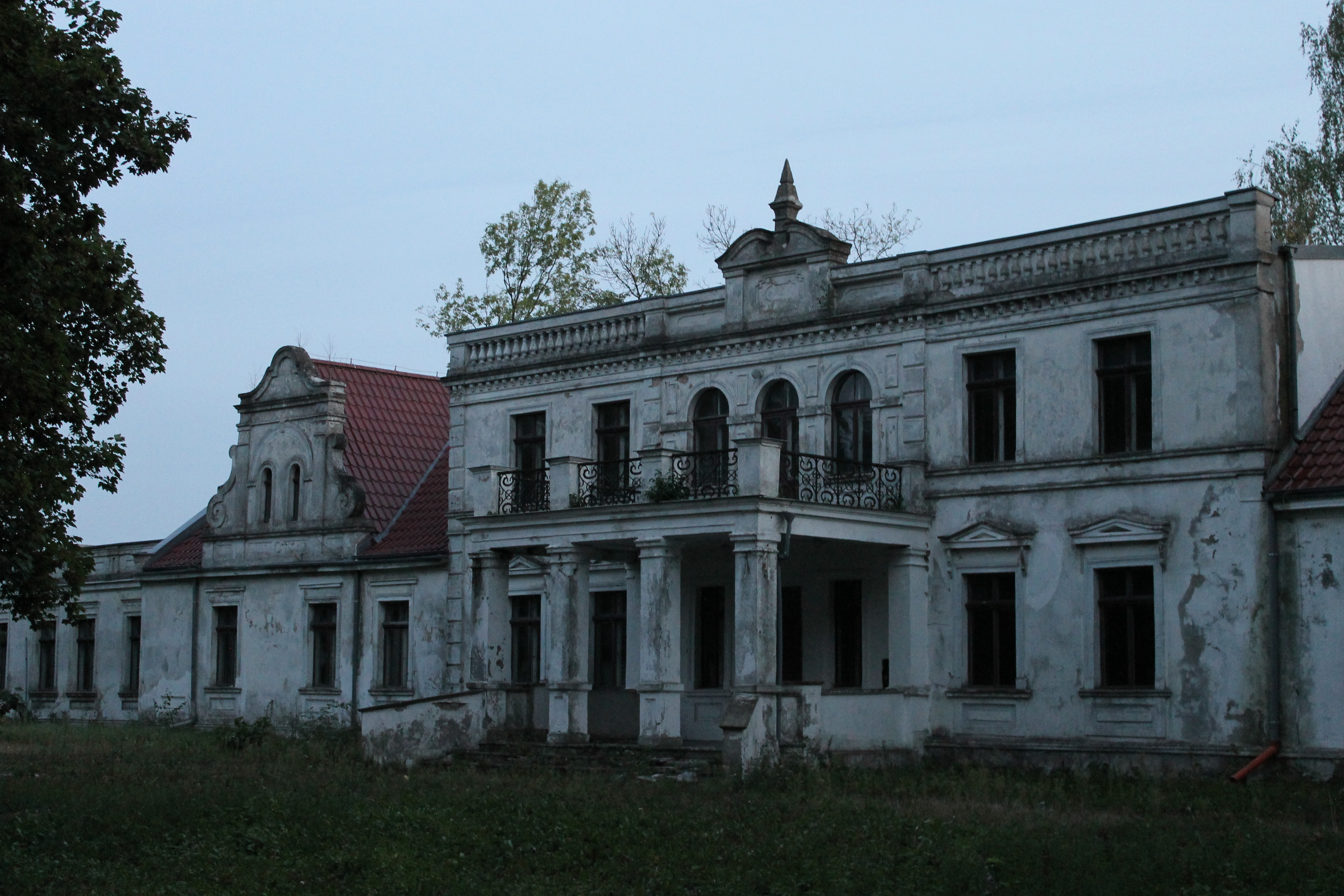
Electric palace in Wałycz, property of Józef and Łucja Gajewski (their son Stanisław sold the property in 1902)

== Family representatives ==
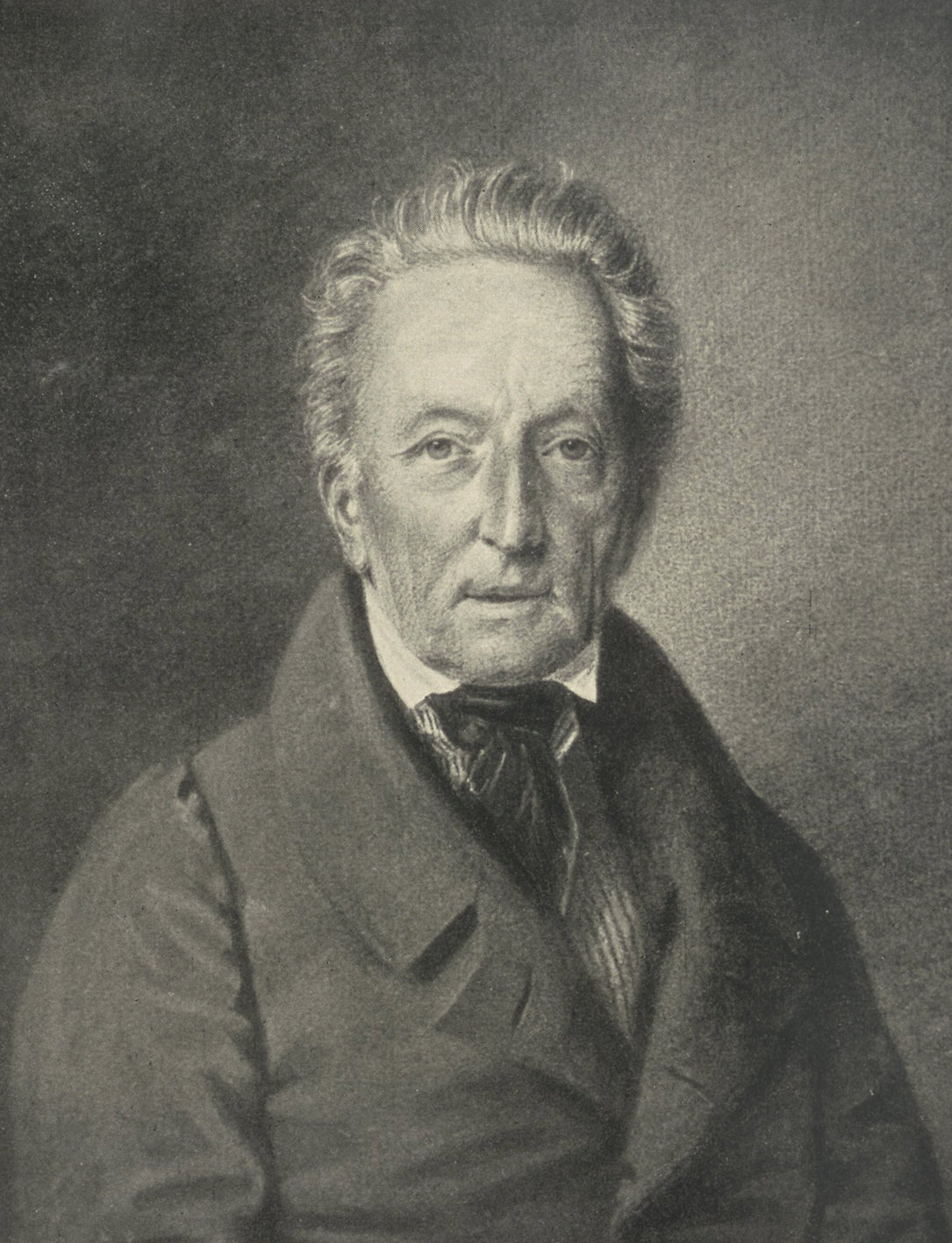
Adam Norbert Gajewski, heir of Wolsztyn, father of Col. Franciszek Gajewski

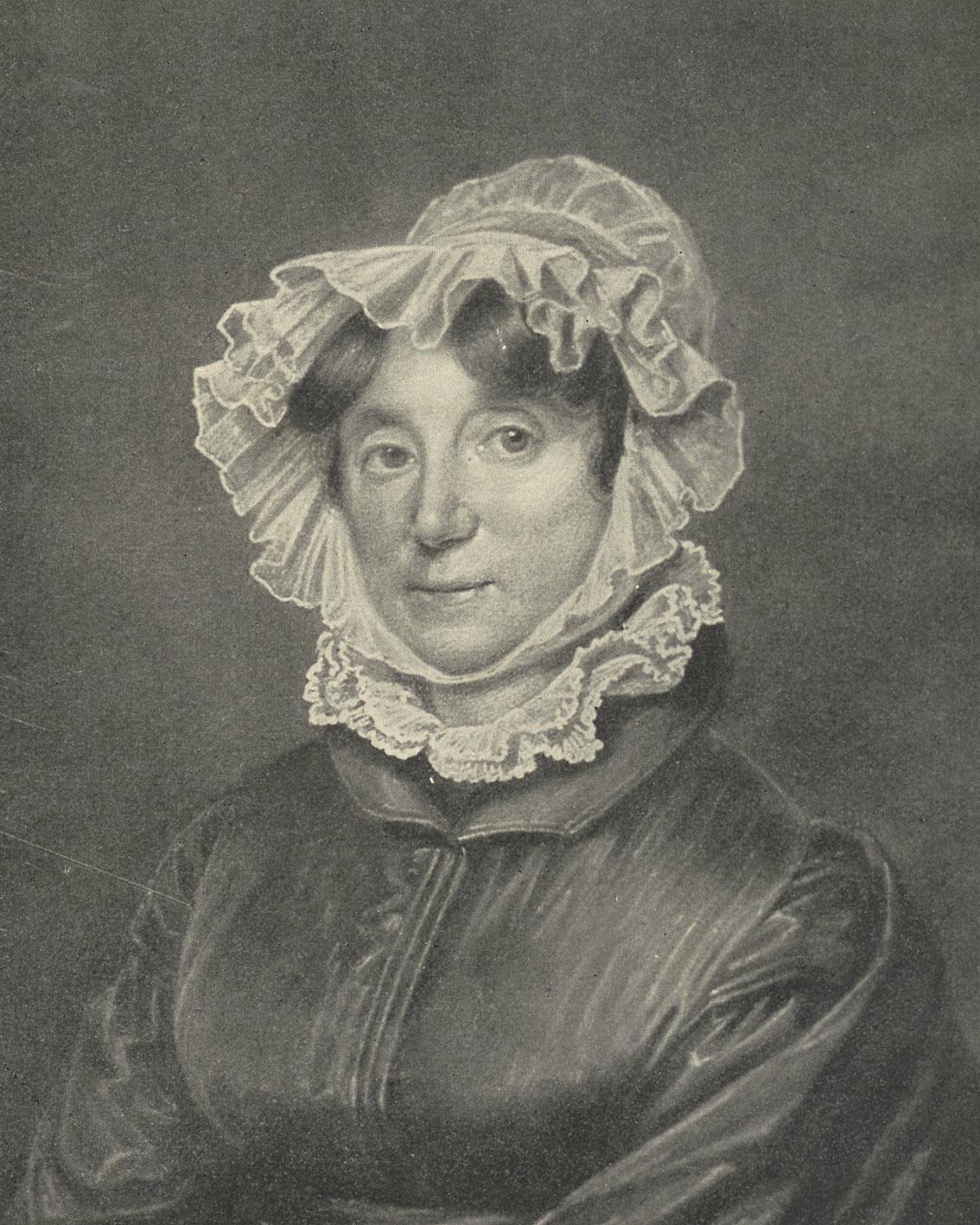
Eleonora Gajewska née Garczyńska, mother of Col. Franciszek Gajewski

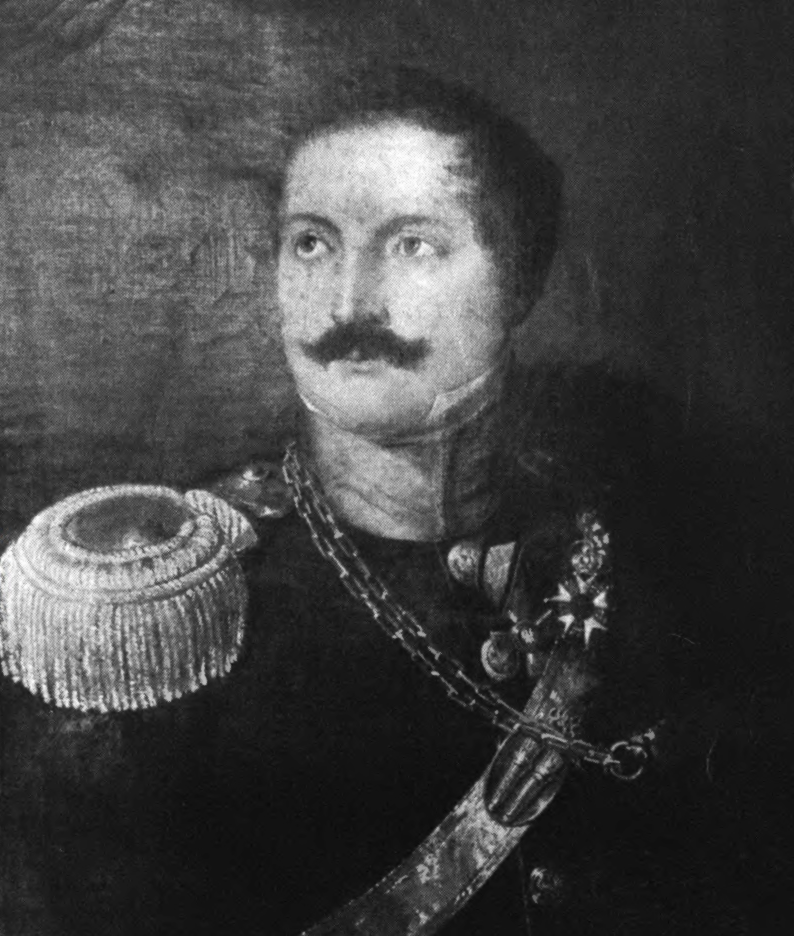
Col. Franciszek Gajewski, adjutant of Emperor Napoleon

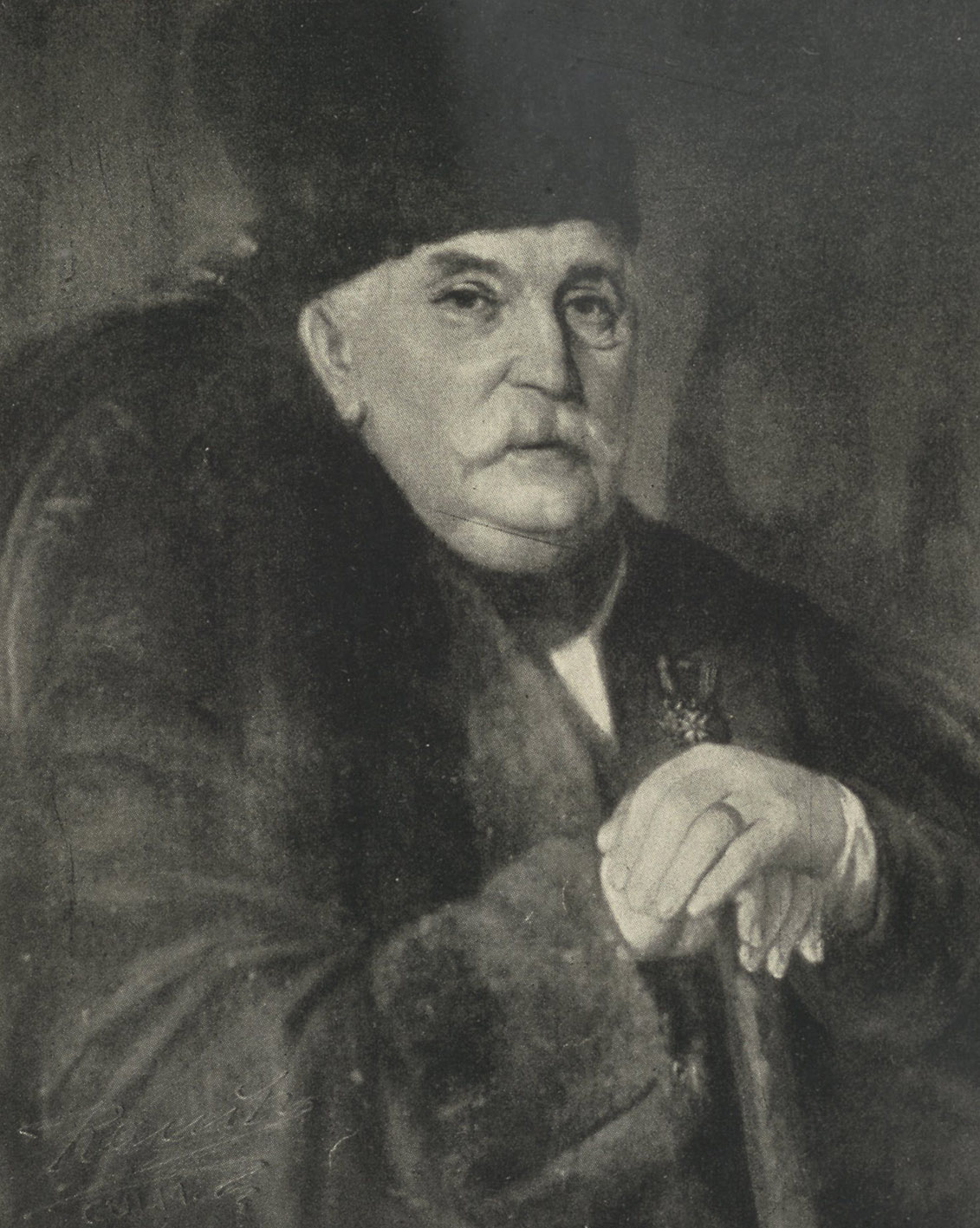
Col. Franciszek Gajewski, in an older age

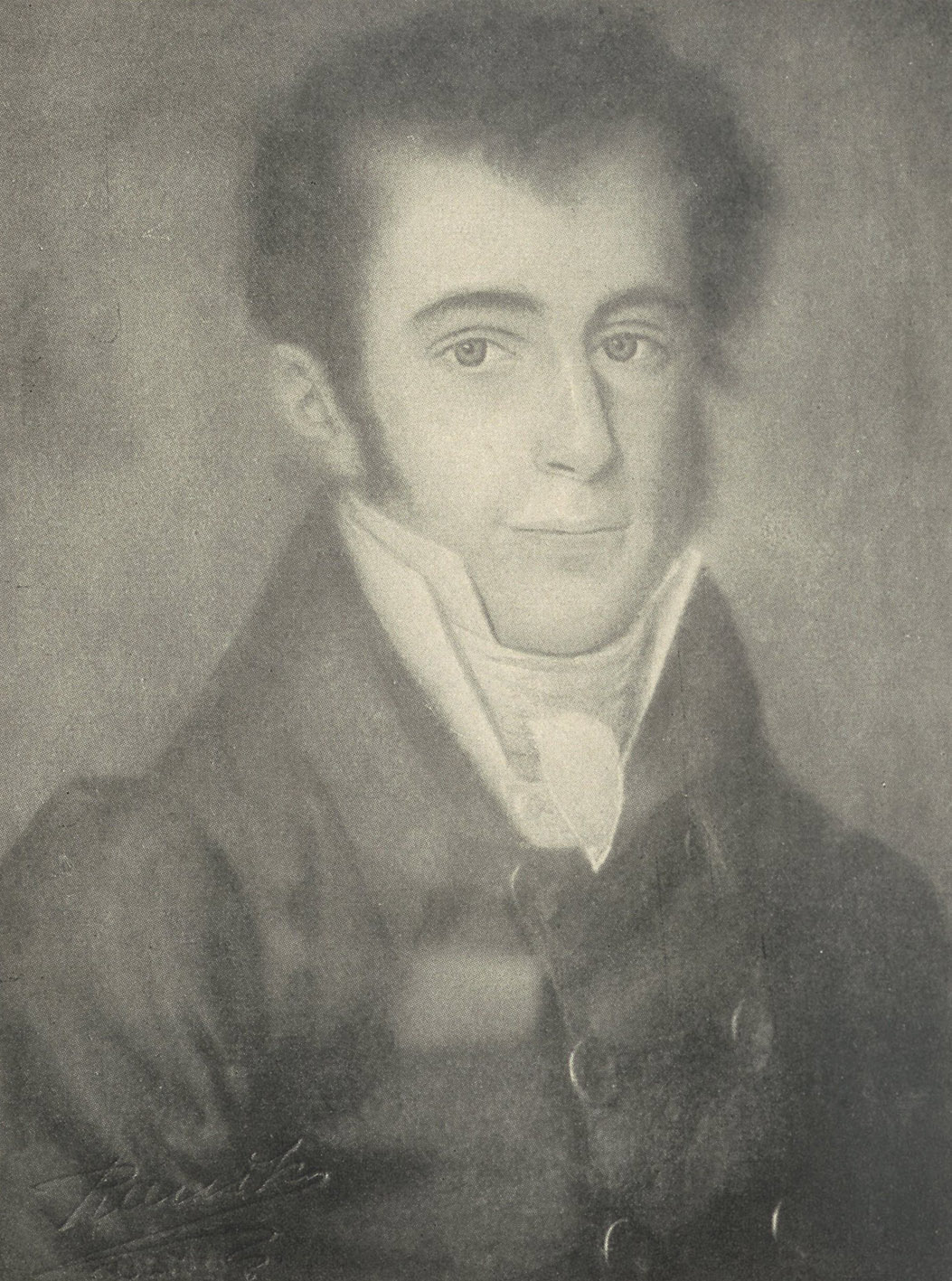
Ewaryst Gajewski

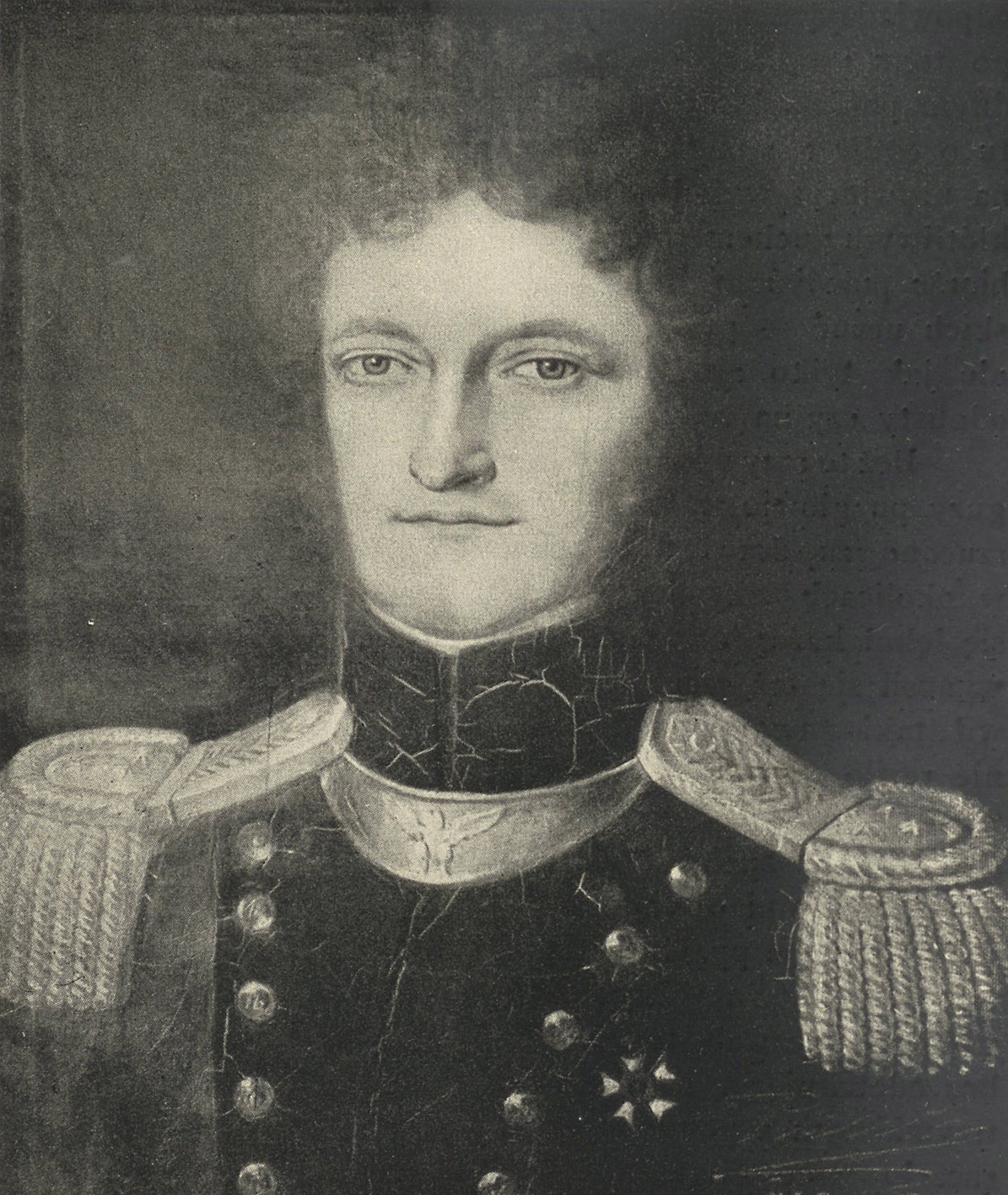
Lt. Col. Józef Gajewski

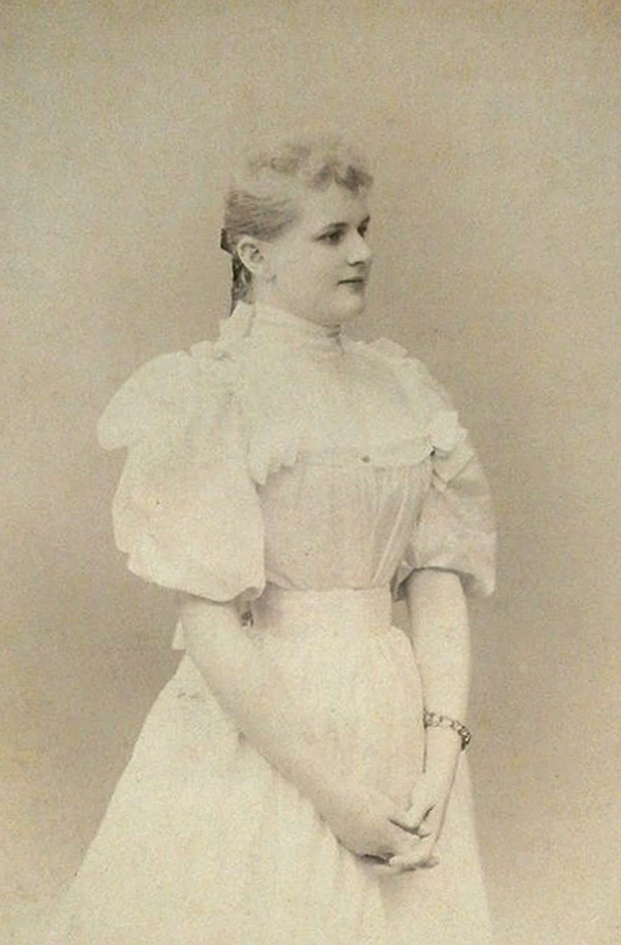
Felicja from Count Mielżyński Gajewska

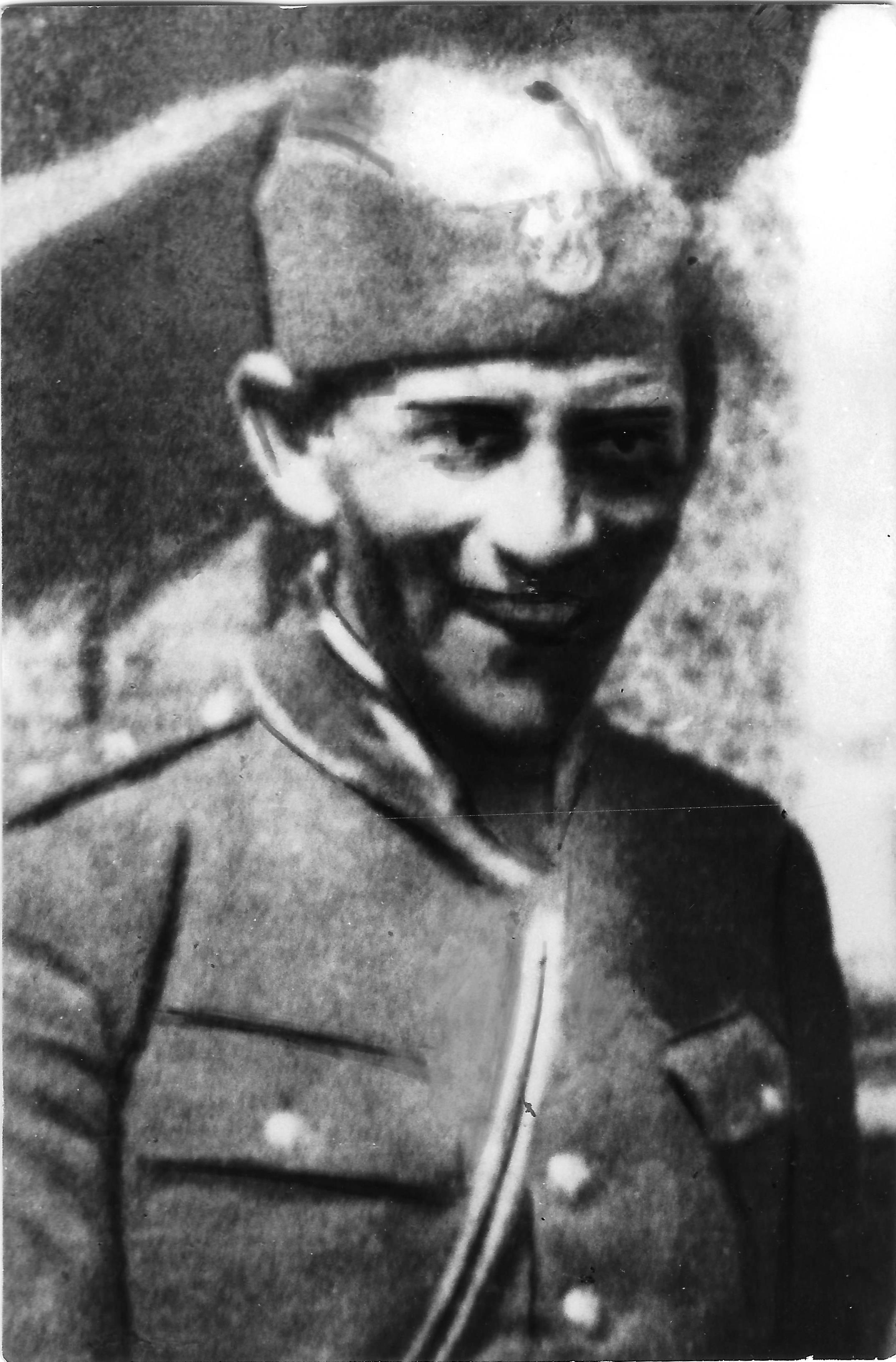
Rtm. Józef Gajewski, decorated with the Order of Virtuti Militari and three times with the Cross of Valor

- Wincenty Gajewski from Błociszewo (died before 1564) - heir of Gaj and Grabianów and part of Błociszewo. As the first of the Błociszewskis, Gaj began to write as Gajewski from his estate, giving rise to a family of this surname. His father was Piotr Błociszewski and his grandfather was Mikołaj from Błociszewo. He got married twice. His first wife was Anna Strzedzewska and the second was Zofia, daughter of Jan Sepiński.
- Erazm Gajewski (died before 1593) - heir of Gaj and parts of Błociszewo and Grabianów, owner of the village of Luczyny and half of Zador and Roszków, the land burgrave of Kościan. His father was Wincenty Gajewski and his mother was Zofia, daughter of Jan Sepiński of the Nowina coat of arms. He got married twice. His first wife was Ewa Bułakowska and the second was Elżbieta Cielecka, the daughter of Mikołaj, the Kalisz bailiff and Magdalena née Galewski.
- Jan Gajewski (died in 1595) - heir of Gaj and a part of Błociszewo and Grabianów, owner of Grodziec, Nietrzanów, Gorzyczek and others, marshal of the coronation parliament (1588), member of the parliament, clerk of the town of Kalisz (1566-1578), eldership and town surrogator Poznań (1578-1582), Poznań land judge (1582-1595). He was the son of Wincenty Gajewski and Zofia Sepińska. His spouse was Barbara, daughter of Piotr Czacki. Jan Gajewski from Błociszewo in 1595 allowed Wojciech Chudziński to join the Ostoja coat of arms.
- Łukasz Gajewski (died around 1618) - heir of estates in Gaj, Przysieka Polska, Gorzyce, Gorzyczki, Czacz and others. He was the son of Erazm and Elżbieta Cielecka. He married Anna Czacka 1v. Rozdrażewska, the daughter of Baltazar Czacki, a Poznań land bailiff.
- Wojciech Gajewski (died in 1609) - heir of the estates of Gorzyce, Gorzyczki, Przysieka Polska, Głuchowo and others, starost of Ujsko-Piła, courtier of king Sigismund III Vasa. He was the son of Jan Gajewski, a Poznań land judge, and Barbara née Czacki. His spouse was Jadwiga Szczawińska. Wojciech Gajewski, as a young man, made many trips around Europe. He studied philosophy and law. He began his education at the University of Leipzig in 1587. Then he studied philosophy in Heidelberg. In the years 1591–1593 he studied in Basel, Strasbourg and Padua.
- Wojciech Gajewski (died 1657) - castellan of Rogozin, starost of Wschowa, elector of Jan II Casimir Vasa from the Poznań voivodeship in 1648, member of parliament (1662, 1665, 1667), heir of the estate in Czacz, where he erected a brick church. He was the son of Łukasz and Anna Czacka. His grandfather was Erazm Gajewski, burgrave of Kościan. He married Apolinara Opalińska.
- Łukasz Gajewski (died 1708) - castellan of Santok in 1690. He was the son of Wojciech, the castellan of Rogozin, and Apollinara née Opalińska. He married Elżbieta Kuczborska.
- Franciszek Gajewski (1675-1734) - the Konarski castellan of Kujawy in 1730, the starost of Kościan. He was the son of Łukasz Gajewski, castellan of Santocki, and Elżbieta Kuczborska. He married Wiktoria Choińska, Abdank coat of arms.
- Antoni Gajewski (died 1775) - the starosts of Kościan and Łęczyca, castellan of Nakło, envoy from the Kalisz voivodeship to the Seym of 1744, elector of King Stanisław August Poniatowski from the Kalisz voivodeship. He was the son of Franciszek, the castellan, and Wiktoria Choińska. He married Izabela Mycielska. He owned Góra and Zalesie.
- Rafał Tadeusz Gajewski (1714-1776) - heir of Wolsztyn, starost of Gniezno, castellan of Rogozin, ensign of Wschowa, member of parliament, elector of King Stanisław August, Knight of the Order of Saint Stanisław. He was the younger son of Franciszek and Wiktoria Choińska. He got married twice. His first wife was Józefa Mielżyńska and the second was Katarzyna Tworzyańska.
- Adam Norbert Gajewski (1755-1834) - heir of Wolsztyn, president of the appellate tribunal in Poznań during the Duchy of Warsaw period. He was the son of Rafał Tadeusz and Katarzyna Tworzyańska. He married Eleonora, daughter of Stefan Garczyński, major general of the Crown forces, adjutant of King Stanisław August and Weronika née Krzycki.
- Bonawentura Gajewski (died after 1812) - civil and military commissar of the Kalisz county, captain of the 3rd National Cavalry Brigade until 1786. He was the son of Rafał Tadeusz and Katarzyna Tworzyańska. He married Anna Maria Mielżyńska.
- Franciszek Gajewski (1792-1868) - colonel, adjutant of Emperor Napoleon I, knight of the Legion of Honor, participant in the November Uprising, commander of the 1st Kalisz Regiment. He was the son of Adam Norbert and Eleonora née Garczyńska. From his wife Emilia Garczyńska, he left sons: Ewaryst and Józef. Author of memoirs published in two volumes by the publishing house - Zdzisław Rzepecki i S-ka in 1913. He wrote about his family house: It struck me in the parental house that they always spoke French to each other, Polish servants and commoners, and German to every official who came, that I always heard the German command when the army was passing through Wolsztyn. I asked my father about the reason for this various speech: Because we are no longer a free nation, said my father with tears in his eyes. - There is no Poland anymore, the Germans and Muscovites have torn our homeland to pieces, but remember, son, that you were born a Pole, never stop loving your homeland, and never serve the oppressors of your nation; for God's punishment will fall sooner or later on the plunderers, a just God.
- Józef Gajewski (died 1831) - lieutenant colonel of the Polish Army of the Congress Kingdom of Poland, commander of the 16th Line Infantry Regiment, participant in the November Uprising. He died on May 26, 1831, in the battle of Ostrołęka. He was the son of Bonawentura and Anna Maria née Mielżyńska. He married Józefa Wincencja Aniela Rychłowska.
- Apolinary Gajewski (1801-1870) - heir of the Wroniewy and Wolsztyn estates, sec. Legion of Lithuania, participant in the November Uprising. He was the son of Adam Norbert and Eleonora née Garczyńska. He was educated in Berlin and Heidelberg. In the years 1827-1830 he traveled to Italy in the company of Stefan Garczyński, his relative. After returning to Poland, he took part in the uprising. In Wolsztyn, inherited from his parents, he erected a neo-Renaissance palace in 1845. He married Eleonora, daughter of Franciszek Garczyński and Katarzyna Radolińska. He died on August 21, 1870, in Wolsztyn. His spouse, Eleonora Garczyńska, went down in the memory of posterity with charity for the Daughters of Charity and the church in Wolsztyn. She was the president of the Society of the Ladies of Mercy of St. Vincent de Paul and the Association of Christian Mothers in Wolsztyn.
- Mirosław Gajewski, ps. Mir (1867-1931) - artist, painter, draftsman, journalist. He was educated in Kharkiv and St. Petersburg. From 1893 he was associated with the Warsaw community. He exhibited his works at the Society for the Encouragement of Fine Arts, Salon Krywult and at the Society of Friends of Fine Arts in Krakow. He was also an illustrator, publicist and caricaturist. He left behind numerous portraits, most often made in the pastel technique.
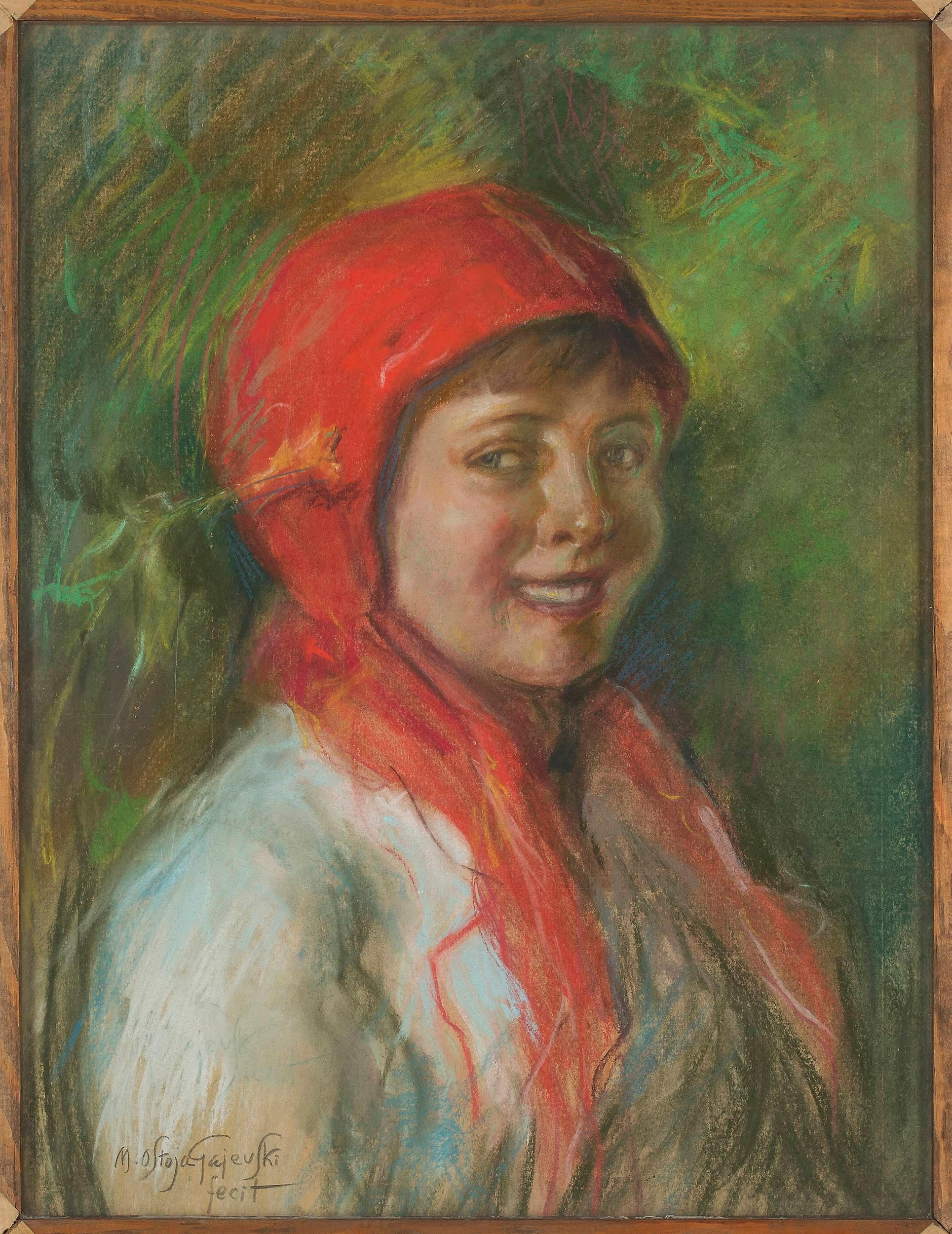
  The girl - pastel by M. Gajewsk
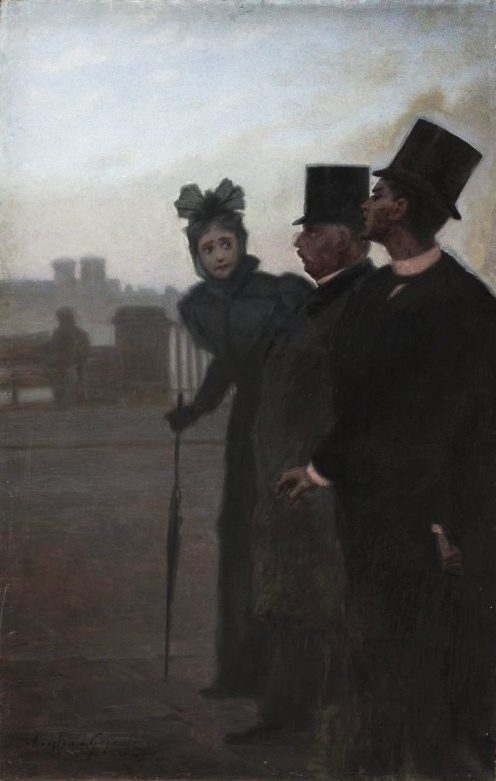
  The Passage - a painting by M. Gajewski
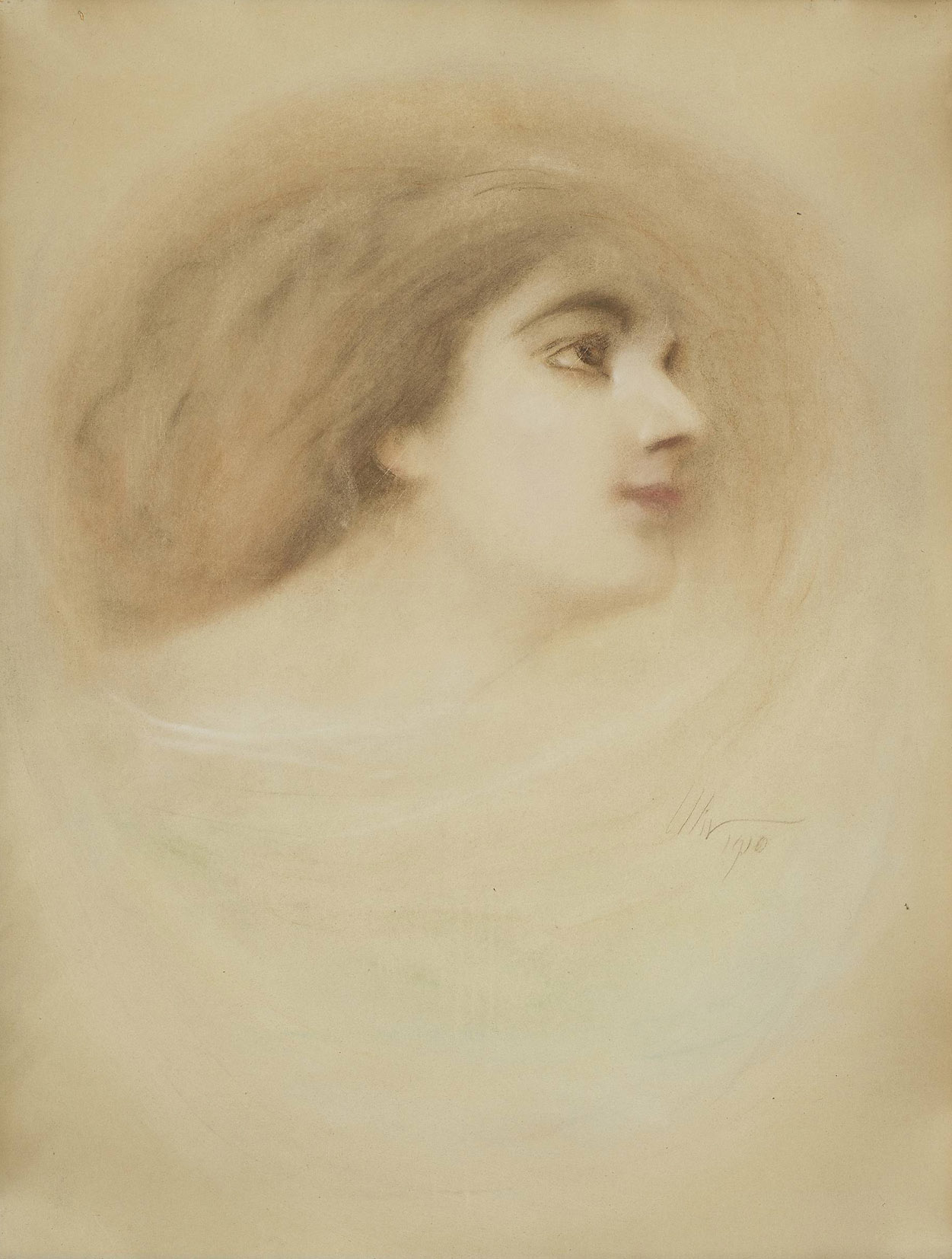
  Woman's profile - pastel by M. Gajewski
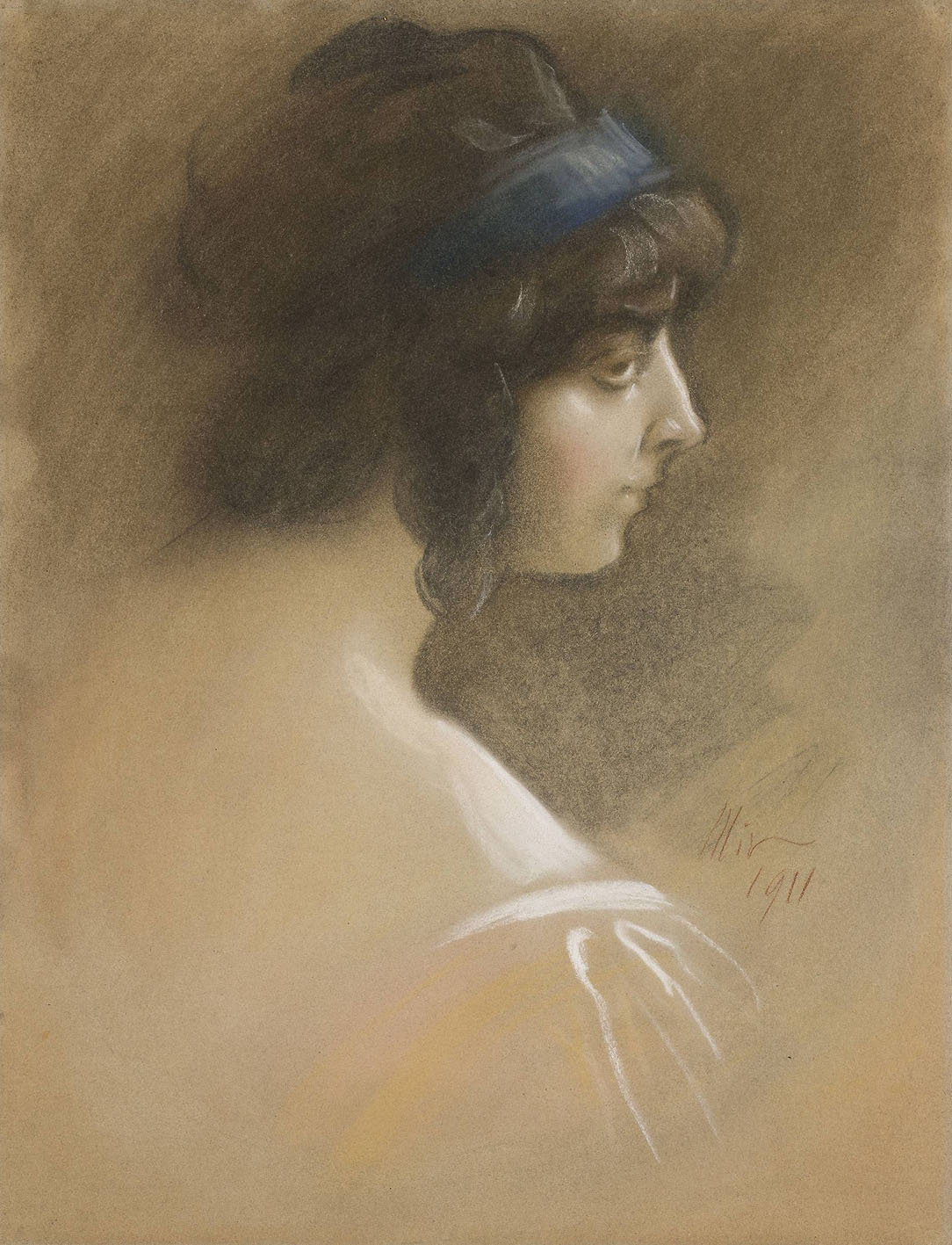
  Portrait of a woman - pastel by M. Gajewski
- Maria née Gajewska count. Potocka (1863–1927) - landowner, social activist, president of the Society of Polish Landowners in Pomerania. She was the daughter of Józef and Łucja née Działowska, owners of the Piątkowo, Wałycz, Mgowo and other estates. She married Count Oswald Potocki, Pilawa coat of arms, son of the major of the Austrian army, Nikodem and Ludwika, Duchess Jabłonowska. She cooperated with the Polish National Committee in Paris. In the years 1911-1921 she was the president of the Society of Polish Landowners in Pomerania. She died on June 30, 1927, in an accident in Napol.
- Felicja from Count Mielżyńskich Gajewska (1877-1939) - landowner, social activist, member of the Scientific Society in Toruń, vice-president of the Society of Polish Landowners in Pomerania, decorated with the Medal of Independence. She was the daughter of Maciej Eliasz, Count. Mielżyński and Teresa née Mycielska. She married Władysław Gajewski (1867-1925), owner of the Turzno estate, son of Józef and Łucja née Działowska, grandson of the sword of Col. Franciszek Gajewski. She was one of the founders of the Pomeranian Childcare Society and the Orphanage in Lubicz. She died in 1939 in Poznań and was buried in the family tomb, in the basement of the church in Wielka Łąka.
- Józef Gajewski pseudonym Tomek (1908-1970) - captain, lieutenant colonel, decorated with the Order of Virtuti Militari and three times with the Cross of Valor. He was born in Warsaw on March 19, 1908. He studied at the State Teacher Training College in Działdowo. He took part in the September 1939 campaign. He was the commander of a partisan unit operating within POS "Jerzyki". In 1944 he was incorporated into the 27th Volhynian Infantry Division of the Home Army. After the division was disarmed, he was active in the WiN structures. In 1946 he was arrested and sentenced to 15 years in prison (released in 1956 as a result of an amnesty). After rehabilitation, he was promoted to the rank of lieutenant colonel. He died on October 6, 1970, in Warsaw and rested in Powązki.

== See also ==
- Ostoja CoA
- Clan Ostoja (Moscics)
- Błociszewski CoA Ostoja
- Church in Stary Białcz founded by Franciszek Wacław Gajewski, son of Wojciech, castellan of Rogozin
- The church in Czacz was erected at the expense of Wojciech Gajewski, the castellan of Rogozin

== Bibliography ==
- F. Gajewski, Pamiętniki Franciszka z Błociszewa Gajewskiego, pułkownika wojsk polskich (1802-1831), S. Karwowski (red.), Poznań 1913, t. I-II.
- Teki Dworzaczka. Materiały historyczno-genealogiczne do dziejów szlachty wielkopolskiej XV-XX w., Biblioteka Kórnicka PAN, Kórnik-Poznań 1995-2019 - Teki Dworzaczka.
- T. Jurek (red.), Słownik historyczno-geograficzny ziem polskich w średniowieczu, Instytut Historii Polskiej Akademii Nauk, 2010–2019, Poznań, część I, s. 450–451.
- K. Niesiecki, Herbarz polski, wyd. J.N. Bobrowicz, Lipsk 1839–1845, t. IV s. 61.
- A. Boniecki, Herbarz polski, Warszawa 1902, t.V, s. 344–347.
- S. Uruski, Rodzina. Herbarz szlachty polskiej, Warszawa 1907, t. IV, s. 76–78.
- R. Kalinowski, Protoheraldyczny znak na portalu kościoła w Wysocicach a historia herbu Ostoja w średniowieczu, Rocznik Polskiego Towarzystwa Heraldycznego nowej serii, t. XV (XXVI).
- Z. Cieplucha, Z przeszłości ziemi Kościańskiej, Kościan 1929.
- M. Pawłowski, Gmina Łysomice. Historia, kultura, tradycja, Rada i Urząd Gminy Łysomice 2014.
