= Ciolkowo =

Ciolkowo may refer to the following places in Poland:

- Ciołkowo, Greater Poland Voivodeship
- Ciółkowo, Masovian Voivodeship
