= Marta Anna Wiecka =

Polish Roman Catholic nun

Blessed Marta Anna Wiecka D.C.
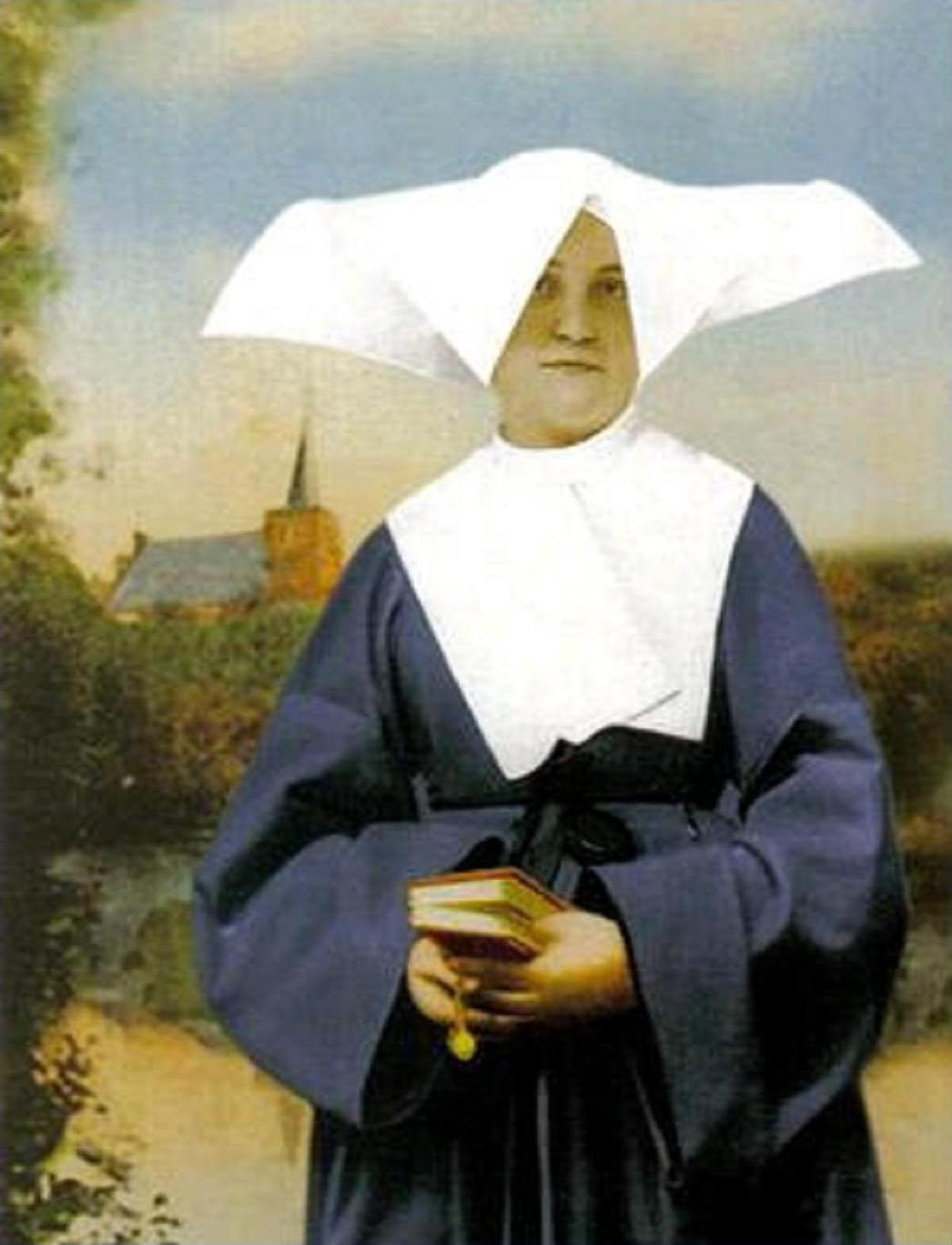

Religious
- Born: 12 January 1874; Nowy Wiec, Province of Prussia, Kingdom of Prussia, German Empire
- Died: 30 May 1904 (aged 30); Sniatyn, Kingdom of Galicia and Lodomeria, Austria-Hungary
- Venerated in: Roman Catholic Church
- Beatified: 24 May 2008, Lviv, Ukraine by Cardinal Tarcisio Bertone
- Feast: 30 May
- Attributes: Religious habit
- Patronage: Nurses

Marta Anna Wiecka, DC (12 January 1874 - 30 May 1904) was a Polish Catholic member of the Daughters of Charity of Saint Vincent de Paul. She assumed the name Maria upon taking vows and worked as a hospital nurse in Poland and Ukraine. She was beatified on 24 May 2008 after a miracle was attributed to her intercession. Cardinal Tarcisio Bertone presided over the beatification on the behalf of Pope Benedict XVI.

== Life ==
Marta Anna Wiecka was born in 1874 in Poland as the third of thirteen children to Marceli Wiecka and Paulina Kamrowska; one brother was the priest Jan (1878-1970). Wiecka was baptized on 18 January 1874 in the parish church of Szczodrowo. She was on the verge of death at the age of two in 1876 but was healed after her parents turned to the Blessed Virgin Mary for her intercession.

Wiecka was a good natured child who aided her mother with the household chores and also dealt with looking after her siblings. She was also known for her ardent devotion to Saint John of Nepomuk; she would have her first Confession on 8 September 1866 and her First Communion on 3 October 1866.

At the age of sixteen she applied to the Vincentian Sisters in Chelmo but was told she was not old enough to join. She tried once more at the age of 18 but was turned to their branch in Kraków where she was accepted.

She entered the Vincentian Sisters in Kraków on 26 April 1892 and assumed the religious name of "Maria". On 12 April 1893 she was clothed in the habit and awaited her first assignment. Following her novitiate she was sent to work as a nurse at a hospital in Lviv in Ukraine. On 15 November 1894 she was moved to a hospital in Podhajce and in 1899 to Bochnia. She made her first vows on 15 August 1897 - on the Feast of the Assumption.

In 1899 she received a vision of the crucified Jesus Christ who urged Wiecka to endure her suffering and defeat it with patience. Her suffering would come to pass soon enough: a patient deemed mental who had left the hospital started a rumor that she was pregnant after an affair with a patient who was a student and nephew of the parish priest; she remained in Bochnia until she managed to prove her innocence.

Wiecka contracted a severe fever after working with ill people in the hospital in 1904 and reported feeling quite weak on 23 May. Her brother, Father Jan, rushed to her bedside upon hearing this news. She died in the evening of 30 May of typhoid. The Jews - before she died - even performed a special service in the hopes she would recover.

== Beatification ==
The beatification process opened in Ukraine after the Congregation for the Causes of Saints approved the opening of the process on 9 October 1997 in an act that granted Wiecka the official title of Servant of God - the first stage of the process. The diocesan process was tasked with collecting documents and evidence that would attest to her potential beatification and spanned from 16 October 1997 until 30 June 1998. The process was declared to have done its work in 1999 and allowed for C.C.S. officials to begin their own investigation.

The Positio was then submitted to the C.C.S. in Rome in 2001 for additional investigation and allowed for them to debate if her cause was credible and could proceed. On 20 December 2004 she was proclaimed to be Venerable after Pope John Paul II acknowledged that Wiecka had lived a life of heroic virtue.

The investigation for a miracle - the prerequisite for her beatification - was held in the diocese of its origin in Poland from 1 July 2003 until 10 October 2003 in which medical documentation and witness testimonies were collated into a large dossier. The miracle was the healing in 2001 of Bronislaw Kohn. The C.C.S. approved the process on 18 June 2004 and began their own investigation into the alleged miracle. It received the papal approval of Pope Benedict XVI in 2007 and allowed for her to be beatified. Cardinal Tarcisio Bertone - on the pope's behalf - presided over the beatification in Lviv on 24 May 2008.

The current postulator assigned to the cause is Father Shijo Kanjirathamkunnel.
