= Łagiewniki, Gmina Sompolno =

Łagiewniki
- Village
- Location within Poland
- Coordinates: 52°18′59″N 18°26′44″E
- Country: Poland
- Voivodeship: Greater Poland
- County: Konin
- Gmina: Sompolno
- Population: 130

Łagiewniki [waɡʲɛvˈniki] is a village in the administrative district of Gmina Sompolno, within Konin County, Greater Poland Voivodeship, in west-central Poland.
