= Krajkowo, Greater Poland Voivodeship =

Krajkowo
- Village
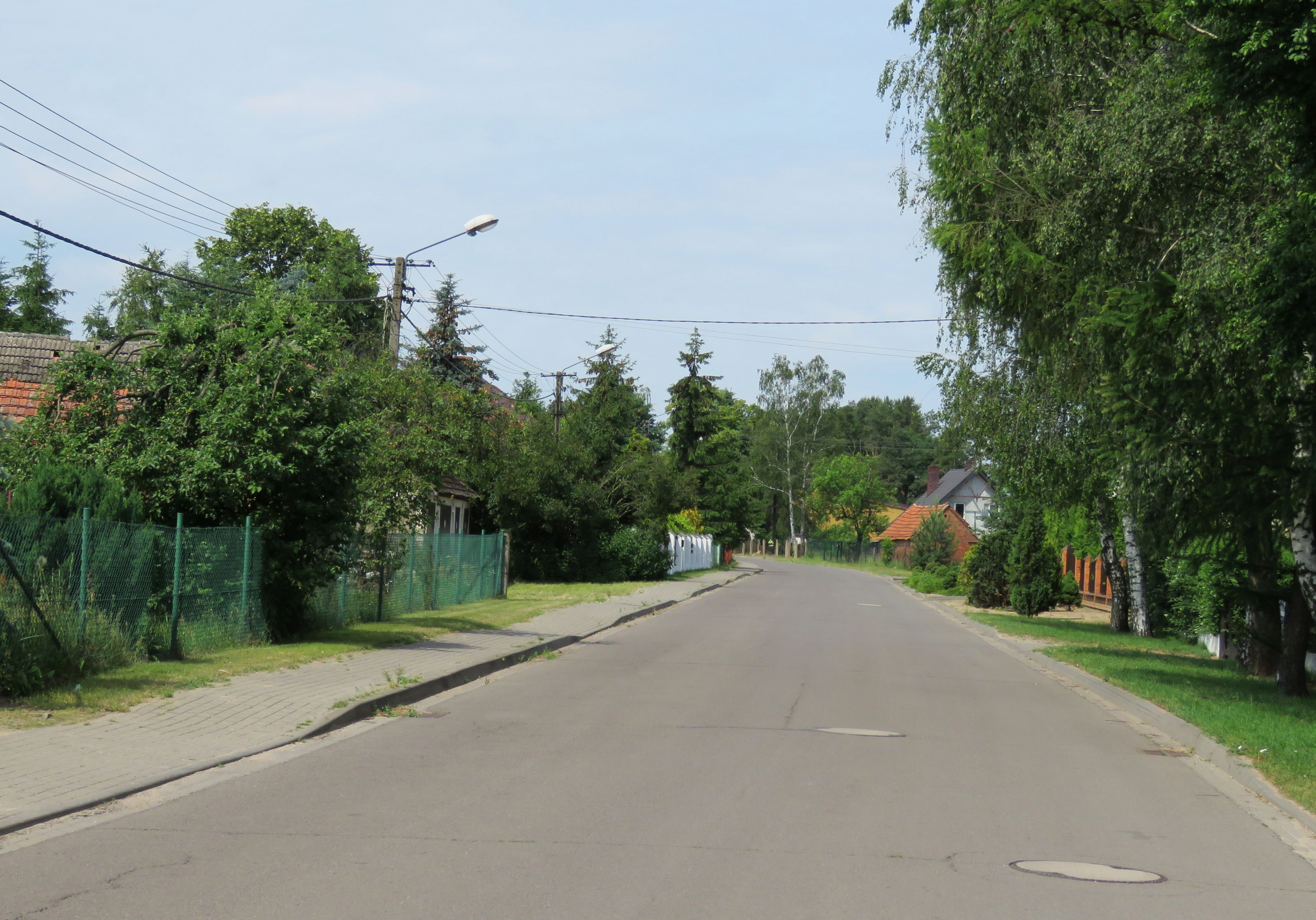

- Location within Poland
- Coordinates: 52°13′N 16°57′E
- Country: Poland
- Voivodeship: Greater Poland
- County: Poznań
- Gmina: Mosina
- Population: 199

Krajkowo [krai̯ˈkɔvɔ] is a village in the administrative district of Gmina Mosina, within Poznań County, Greater Poland Voivodeship, in west-central Poland.

Krajkowo had a population of 199 as of the 2021 census.
