= Grabianowo, Śrem County =

Grabianowo
- Village
- Location within Poland
- Coordinates: 52°7′N 16°53′E
- Country: Poland
- Voivodeship: Greater Poland
- County: Śrem
- Gmina: Brodnica

Grabianowo [ɡrabjaˈnɔvɔ] is a village in the administrative district of Gmina Brodnica, within Śrem County, Greater Poland Voivodeship, in west-central Poland.

From 1975 to 1998, Grabianowo administratively belonged to Poznań Voivodeship.
