= Tuczępy, Greater Poland Voivodeship =

Tuczępy
- Village
- Location within Poland
- Coordinates: 52°32′N 16°1′E
- Country: Poland
- Voivodeship: Greater Poland
- County: Międzychód
- Gmina: Międzychód

Tuczępy [tuˈt͡ʂɛmpɨ] is a village in the administrative district of Gmina Międzychód, within Międzychód County, Greater Poland Voivodeship, in west-central Poland.
