= Marszewo, Śrem County =

Marszewo
- Village
- Location within Poland
- Coordinates: 52°5′N 16°59′E
- Country: Poland
- Voivodeship: Greater Poland
- County: Śrem
- Gmina: Śrem

Marszewo [marˈʂɛvɔ] is a village in the administrative district of Gmina Śrem, within Śrem County, Greater Poland Voivodeship, in west-central Poland.
