= Smogorzewo, Greater Poland Voivodeship =

Smogorzewo
- Village
- Location within Poland
- Coordinates: 51°54′46″N 17°5′9″E
- Country: Poland
- Voivodeship: Greater Poland
- County: Gostyń
- Gmina: Piaski
- Population: 449

Smogorzewo [smɔɡɔˈʐɛvɔ] is a village in the administrative district of Gmina Piaski, within Gostyń County, Greater Poland Voivodeship, in west-central Poland.
