= Chaławy =

- Village
- Location within Poland
- Coordinates: 52°8′N 16°51′E
- Country: Poland
- Voivodeship: Greater Poland
- County: Śrem
- Gmina: Brodnica
- Population: 320

Chaławy [xaˈwavɨ] is a village in the administrative district of Gmina Brodnica, within Śrem County, Greater Poland Voivodeship, in west-central Poland.
