= Wałycz =

- Village
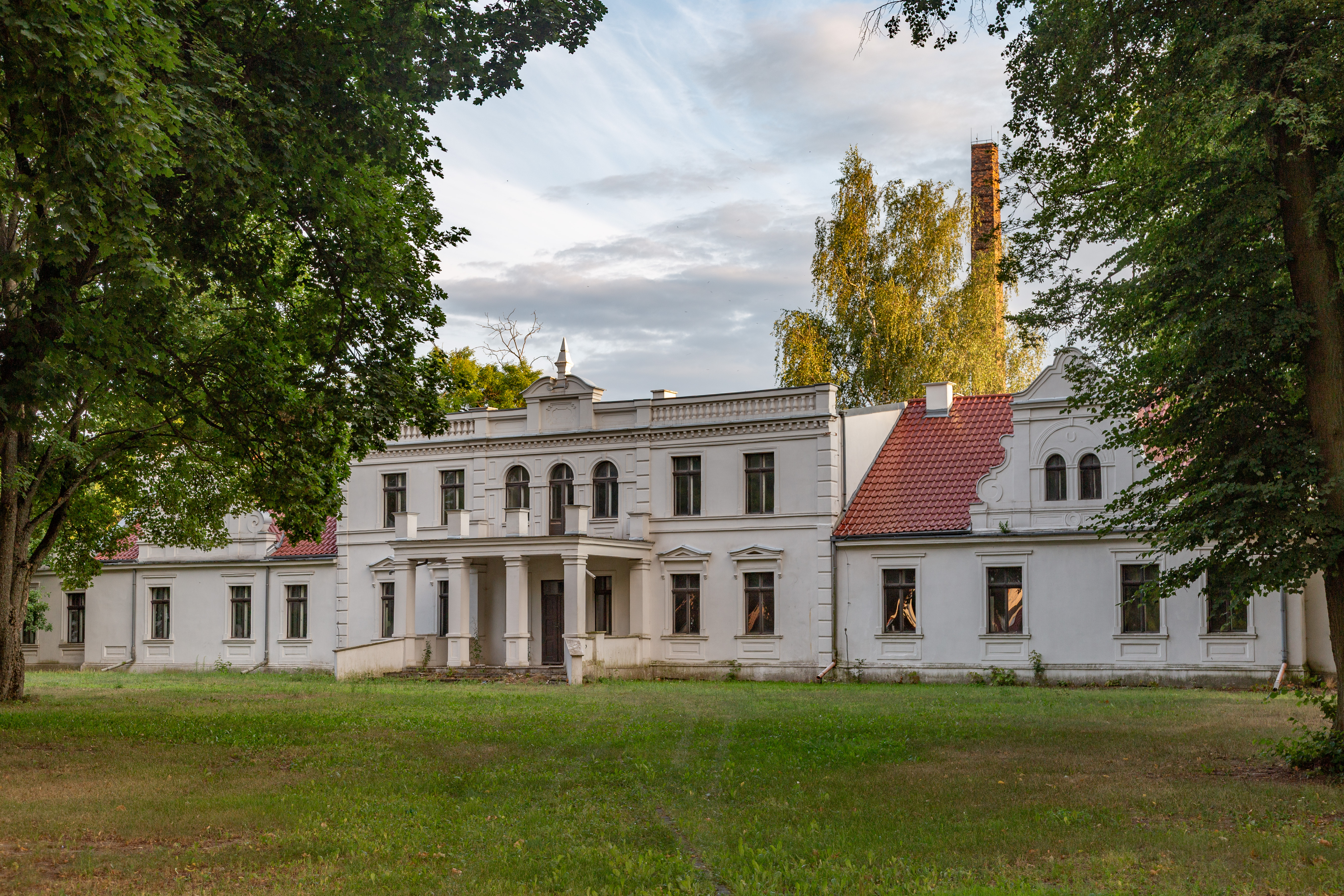
- Wałycz Palace

- Location within Poland
- Coordinates: 53°16′N 19°0′E
- Country: Poland
- Voivodeship: Kuyavian-Pomeranian
- County: Wąbrzeźno
- Gmina: Wąbrzeźno
- Time zone: UTC+1 (CET)
  - Summer (DST): UTC+2 (CEST)

Wałycz [ˈvawɨt͡ʂ] is a village in the administrative district of Gmina Wąbrzeźno, within Wąbrzeźno County, Kuyavian-Pomeranian Voivodeship, in north-central Poland.
