= Szczepowice =

- Village
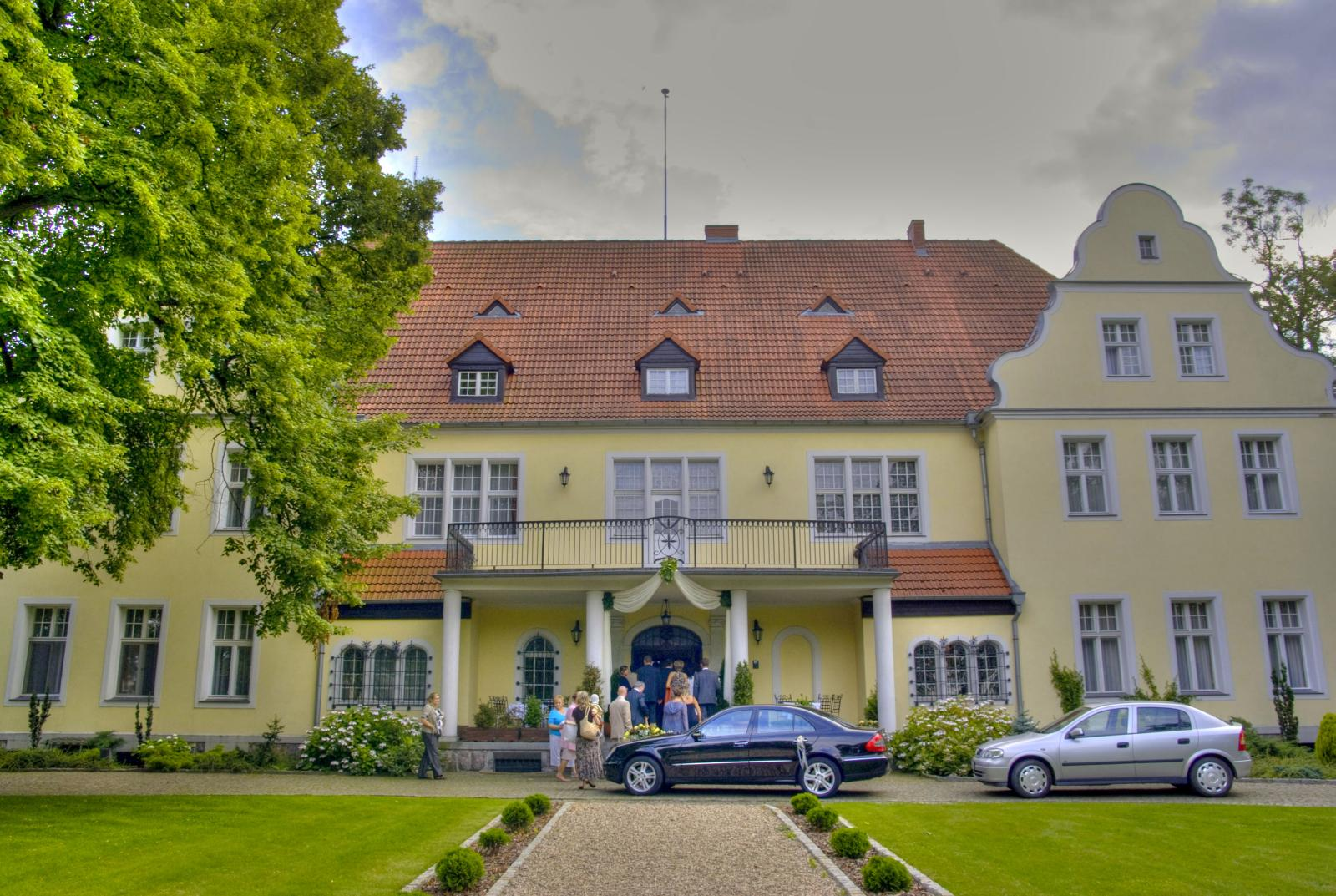

- Location within Poland
- Coordinates: 52°10′36″N 16°35′08″E
- Country: Poland
- Voivodeship: Greater Poland
- County: Grodzisk
- Gmina: Kamieniec
- Population: 300

Szczepowice [ʂt͡ʂɛpɔˈvit͡sɛ] is a village in the administrative district of Gmina Kamieniec, within Grodzisk County, Greater Poland Voivodeship, in west-central Poland.
