= Witów, Gmina Warta =

Witów
- Village
- Location within Poland
- Coordinates: 51°43′11″N 18°33′45″E
- Country: Poland
- Voivodeship: Łódź
- County: Sieradz
- Gmina: Warta
- Population: 120

Witów [ˈvituf] is a village in the administrative district of Gmina Warta, within Sieradz County, Łódź Voivodeship, in central Poland.
