= Piątkowo, Golub-Dobrzyń County =

Piątkowo
- Village
- Location within Poland
- Coordinates: 53°12′N 18°59′E
- Country: Poland
- Voivodeship: Kuyavian-Pomeranian
- County: Golub-Dobrzyń
- Gmina: Kowalewo Pomorskie

Piątkowo [pjɔntˈkɔvɔ] is a village in the administrative district of Gmina Kowalewo Pomorskie, within Golub-Dobrzyń County, Kuyavian-Pomeranian Voivodeship, in north-central Poland.
