= Szczodrowo, Greater Poland Voivodeship =

Szczodrowo
- Village
- Location within Poland
- Coordinates: 52°6′11″N 16°36′6″E
- Country: Poland
- Voivodeship: Greater Poland
- County: Kościan
- Gmina: Kościan
- Population: 166

Szczodrowo [ʂt͡ʂɔˈdrɔvɔ] is a village in the administrative district of Gmina Kościan, within Kościan County, Greater Poland Voivodeship, in west-central Poland.
