= Depot =

Depot may refer to:

== Places ==
- Depot, Poland, a village
- Depot Glacier (disambiguation)
- Depot Island (disambiguation)
- Depot Nunatak
- Depot Peak

== Brands and enterprises ==
- Maxwell Street Depot, a restaurant in Chicago, United States
- Office Depot, an American office supply chain
- The Home Depot, an American home improvement retail chain

== Computing and technology ==
- Depot, an application in the Radio Service Software

== Military ==
- Depot, or logistics center
- Depot, or Main Operating Base, an overseas base for the US military
- Regimental depot, the headquarters and training grounds of a regiment
- Supply depot

== Transport ==
- Depot, a transport hub for freight
- Train depot or train shed, a place where locomotives and rolling stock are sheltered and maintained when not in use
- Bus depot or bus garage, a place where buses are sheltered and maintained when not in use
  - Bus station, whose name can include the word depot, because a bus depot or garage can be, or previously was, a bus stop or terminal
- Castaway depot, contains stores and survival gear for victims of shipwrecks
- Motive power depot, where trains, locomotives, or trams are sheltered and maintained when not in use
  - Train station, whose name can include the word depot, because the same place was previously, or still is, being used as a train shelter, and naturally became a railway station as well
- Propellant depot, which supplies fuel to spacecraft

== Other uses ==
- Depot injection, in pharma, a long-term drug delivery by an injection formation (typically 2 weeks - 6 months)
- RCMP Academy, Depot Division, in Saskatchewan, Canada

== See also ==
- Depot Historic District (disambiguation)
- The Depot (disambiguation)
