= Alphard Island =

Island in Antarctica

Meøya
- Location within Antarctica

Geography
- Location: Antarctica
- Coordinates: 66°58′S 57°25′E
- Length: 4.6 km (2.86 mi)
- Highest elevation: 150 m (490 ft)

Administration
- Administered under the Antarctic Treaty System

Demographics
- Population: Uninhabited

Alphard Island (66°58′S 57°25′E) or Meøya is an island 4.6 kilometres (2.5 nmi) long and rising to 150 metres (500 ft), lying north of Shaula Island in the Øygarden Group. It was mapped by Norwegian cartographers from aerial photos taken by the Lars Christensen Expedition, 1936–37, and called "Meøya" ("Middle Island"). It was first visited by an Australian National Antarctic Research Expeditions party led by R. Dovers in 1954; the island was renamed by the Antarctic Names Committee of Australia after the star Alphard, which was used for an astrofix in the vicinity.

== See also ==
- List of Antarctic and sub-Antarctic islands
- Cartography
