= Depot Island =

Depot Island is the name of several islands. It may refer to:

- Depot Island (Bounty Islands), New Zealand
- Depot Island, Kemp Land, Antarctica
- Depot Island, Victoria Land, Antarctica
- Depot Island Formation, a geological formation in Greenland

== See also ==
- Depot (disambiguation)
