= Watson Nunatak =

Watson Nunatak (67°58′S 62°45′E) is a nunatak standing between Price and Van Hulssen Nunataks in the Trilling Peaks, Framnes Mountains, in Mac. Robertson Land. It was mapped by Norwegian cartographers from air photos taken by the Lars Christensen Expedition, 1936–37. I was named by the Antarctic Names Committee of Australia (ANCA) for K.D. Watson, a diesel mechanic at Mawson Station who assisted in the Framnes Mountains--Depot Peak survey by ANARE (Australian National Antarctic Research Expeditions) in 1965.
