= Abrupt Island =

Island in Antarctica

Brattöy
- Location within Antarctica

Geography
- Location: Antarctica
- Coordinates: 67°0′S 57°46′E
- Width: 0.8 km (0.5 mi)

Administration
- Administered under the Antarctic Treaty System

Demographics
- Population: Uninhabited

Abrupt Island, also known as Brattöy, is an island 0.8 kilometres (0.5 mi) across, lying 2.4 kilometres (1.5 mi) east of Lang Island, east of the Øygarden Group and Edward VIII Bay. Mapped by Norwegian cartographers from aerial photos taken by the Lars Christensen Expedition, 1936–37, and called Brattoy ("abrupt island"). The Norwegian name was translated by ANCA following a 1954 ANARE (Australian National Antarctic Research Expeditions) survey of the area.

== See also ==
- List of Antarctic and sub-Antarctic islands
