= Depot Island, Kemp Land =

Island of Antarctica

Depot Island
- Location within Antarctica

Geography
- Location: Antarctica
- Coordinates: 66°56′S 57°19′E

Administration
- Administered under the Antarctic Treaty System

Demographics
- Population: Uninhabited

Depot Island is a small island in the Øygarden Group, lying 2 kilometres (1 nmi) north of the western end of Shaula Island. It was mapped by Norwegian cartographers from aerial photographs taken by the Lars Christensen Expedition, 1936–37, and so named by the Antarctic Names Committee of Australia because a depot was established there by the Australian National Antarctic Research Expeditions during 1956.

== See also ==
- List of Antarctic and sub-Antarctic islands
