= Achernar Island =

Island in Oygarden Group, Antarctica

Utöy
- Location within Antarctica

Geography
- Location: Antarctica
- Coordinates: 66°58′S 57°12′E
- Length: 2.8 km (1.74 mi)

Administration
- Administered under the Antarctic Treaty System

Demographics
- Population: Uninhabited

Achernar Island (66°58′S 57°12′E), also known as Utöy, is an island 2.8 kilometres (1.5 nmi) long, lying 1.9 kilometres (1 nmi) west of Shaula Island in the Øygarden Group. Mapped by Norwegian cartographers from aerial photos taken by the Lars Christensen Expedition, 1936–37, and named Utoy (the outer island). The group was first visited by an ANARE (Australian National Antarctic Research Expeditions) party in 1954; the island was renamed by ANCA after the star Achernar, which was used for an astrofix in the vicinity.

== See also ==
- List of Antarctic and sub-Antarctic islands
