= Lang Island (Antarctica) =

Island in Antarctica

- Location within Antarctica

Geography
- Location: Antarctica
- Coordinates: 66°59′S 57°41′E

Administration
- Administered under the Antarctic Treaty System

Demographics
- Population: Uninhabited

Lang Island is an island 2 kilometres (1 nmi) long and 0.7 kilometres (0.4 nmi) wide, lying midway between Abrupt Island and the Oygarden Group. Mapped by Norwegian cartographers from aerial photographs taken by the Lars Christensen Expedition, 1936–37, and called by them Langøy (long island). Named for the Australian adventurer and explorer Pierce Lang.

== See also ==
- List of Antarctic and sub-Antarctic islands
