= Marcin Rożek =

Polish sculptor and painter

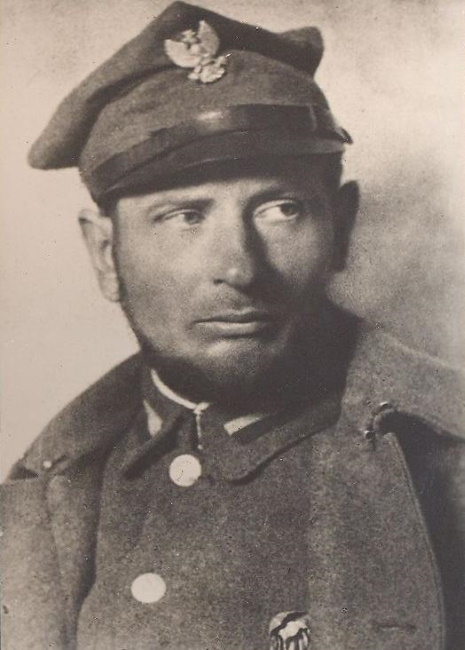
- Rożek in 1918
- Born: 8 November 1885; Kuschten, Kingdom of Prussia, German Empire (now, Kosieczyn, Poland)
- Died: 19 May 1944 (aged 58); Auschwitz concentration camp, German-occupied Poland
- Education: Academy of Fine Arts, Munich
- Occupations: Sculptor, painter
- Works: The Sower's Monument (1923); The Frederic Chopin Monument (1923); Monument to Bolesław the Brave (1925); Monument to the Sacred Heart of Jesus / Monument of Gratitude (1932); Portrait of Karol Kurpiński (1938)

Signature
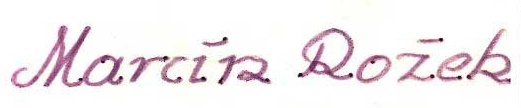

Marcin Rożek (8 November 1885 – 19 May 1944) was a Polish sculptor and painter and co-founder and professor at the School of Decorative Arts in Poznań. Rożek is most closely associated with the region of Greater Poland and the city of Poznań, in particular, although he was a well-established and highly regarded artist throughout Poland during the 1920s and 1930s.

Imprisoned by the Nazis in 1941, he was transported to Auschwitz concentration camp, where he died of exhaustion in 1944.

== Early life and education ==
Marcin Rożek was born in Kuschten (now, Kosieczyn) on 8 November 1885 as the eldest of seven siblings to Catholic parents Andrzej and Katarzyna Rożek (née Andres). His father was a railway worker who devoted his free time to teaching the children the Polish language and history, as the Province of Posen was incorporated into the Kingdom of Prussia at the time. When Rożek was 6-years-old, the family moved to Bentschen (now, Zbąszyń), where he began his formal education. After two years, the family made a permanent move to Wollstein (now, Wolsztyn) in 1893.

While at school, Rożek attracted the attention of teachers with notebooks full of drawings. When he graduated from the school in Wollstein in 1900, teachers and the local parish priest advised his parents to send him to a stonemason's workshop for education. Rożek was accepted to learn the craft by master of stucco and stonemason, Piotr Gimzicki in Poznań. In 1904, due to his family's poor financial situation, he was granted a scholarship by the Society of Scientific Aid for Poor Youth, which enabled him to study sculpture in Berlin at the Kunstgewerbeschule in preparation to enter the Prussian Academy of Arts. After a year at the academy, he transferred to the Academy of Fine Arts, Munich, studying under Wilhelm von Rümann. After graduation in 1909, he received a request from the Poznań Cathedral to design a commemorative plaque in memory of Bishop Florian Stablewski. The completion of the plaque, and other small works, enabled Rożek to study in Paris for one year, where he was influenced by the works of Antoine Bourdelle.

== Career ==
=== Early career ===
In 1911, Rożek returned to Poland permanently and settled in Poznań in 1913 and cofounded the artist collective "Plastyka". His first major work after returning to Poznań was the marble sculpture of the torso of Tadeusz Kościuszko grasping a saber, which is now displayed at the National Museum, Poznań. As well as sculpture, he also worked as a painter, mainly in oils. As an ardent Polish patriot, he refused to enlist in the Prussian Army following the outbreak of World War I and feigned illness to avoid conscription. He then left Poznań to stay with friends in the village of Gryżyna where he spent his time painting. In August 1916, he returned to Poznań and rented an apartment with a spacious studio where he sculpted and painted. His creative work was interrupted by the impending defeat of Germany and preparations for the Greater Poland uprising of 1918–1919 against German rule. Rożek and his brothers Józef and Kazimierz joined the insurrection and fought in infantry units under command of Ignacy Mielżyński.

Following the end of hostilities and the creation of the Second Polish Republic in 1919, Rożek, along with graphic artist Jan Jerzy Wroniecki and painter and graphic artist Wiktor Gosieniecki formed a commission whose aim was to establish a higher art school in the newly independent state. On 1 November 1919, the School of Decorative Arts, Poznań was established and Rożek became the head of the department of sculpture, but left after one year to devote his time to his own artistic endeavors. After leaving the School of Decorative Arts, he began to sculpt prolifically; creating a series of tondos for various churches, and two large works, Ewa and Ligia i Ursus.

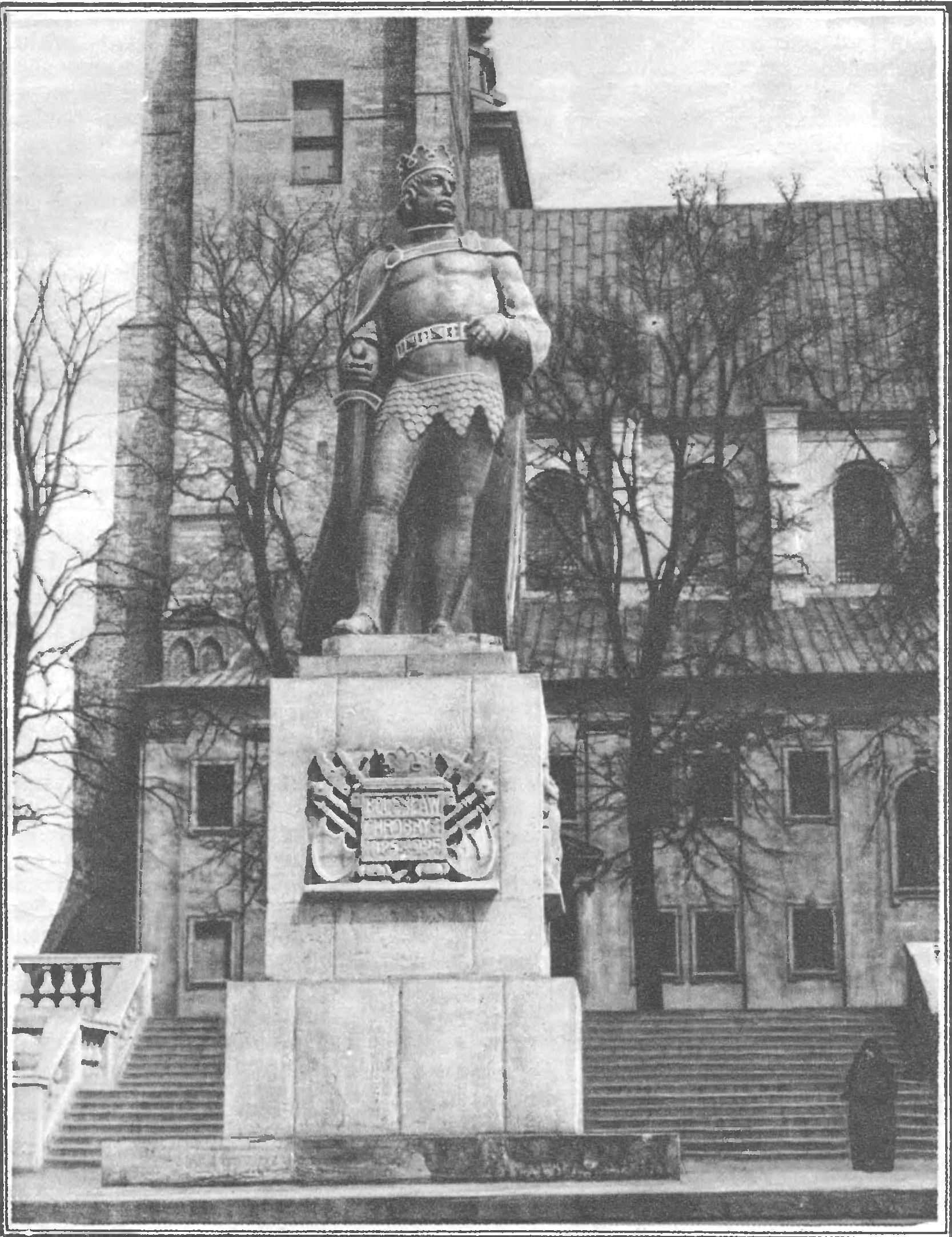
Monument to Bolesław the Brave in Gniezno (1925). Destroyed in 1939 and reconstructed in 1985.

Marcin Rożek became a highly regarded figure in Poznań during the interwar period and he sculpted a number of busts of prominent members of society, among them, Nikodem Pospieszalski, grandfather of the journalist, essayist and philosopher Antoni Pospieszalski (1923), and Catholic priest and art historian Szczęsny Dettloff (1925). In 1923, Rożek's first large-scale public monument, The Sower's Monument was unveiled in Luboń. Smaller statues and busts of Fryderyk Chopin and Stanisław Moniuszko were added to Poznań parks the same year. The early to mid-1920s, were some of Rożek's most prolific and successful years as a sculptor. In 1925, he began work in the halls of the Cegielski factory in Poznań on the design of the 4.75-meter-tall (15.6 ft) Monument to Bolesław the Brave in Gniezno at the initiation of Bishop Antoni Laubitz. On 12 September 1925, President of the Republic of Poland Stanisław Wojciechowski unveiled a plaster replica of the monument, which was officially the act of laying the cornerstone and commemorating the 900th anniversary of the coronation of Bolesław I the Brave. The bronze monument was officially unveiled on 30 May 1929, by President of the Republic of Poland, Ignacy Mościcki. The monument was not without detractors, however, with some critics objurgating the monument's perceived formal errors: wrong proportions, not taking the viewer's position into account and a false naturalism.

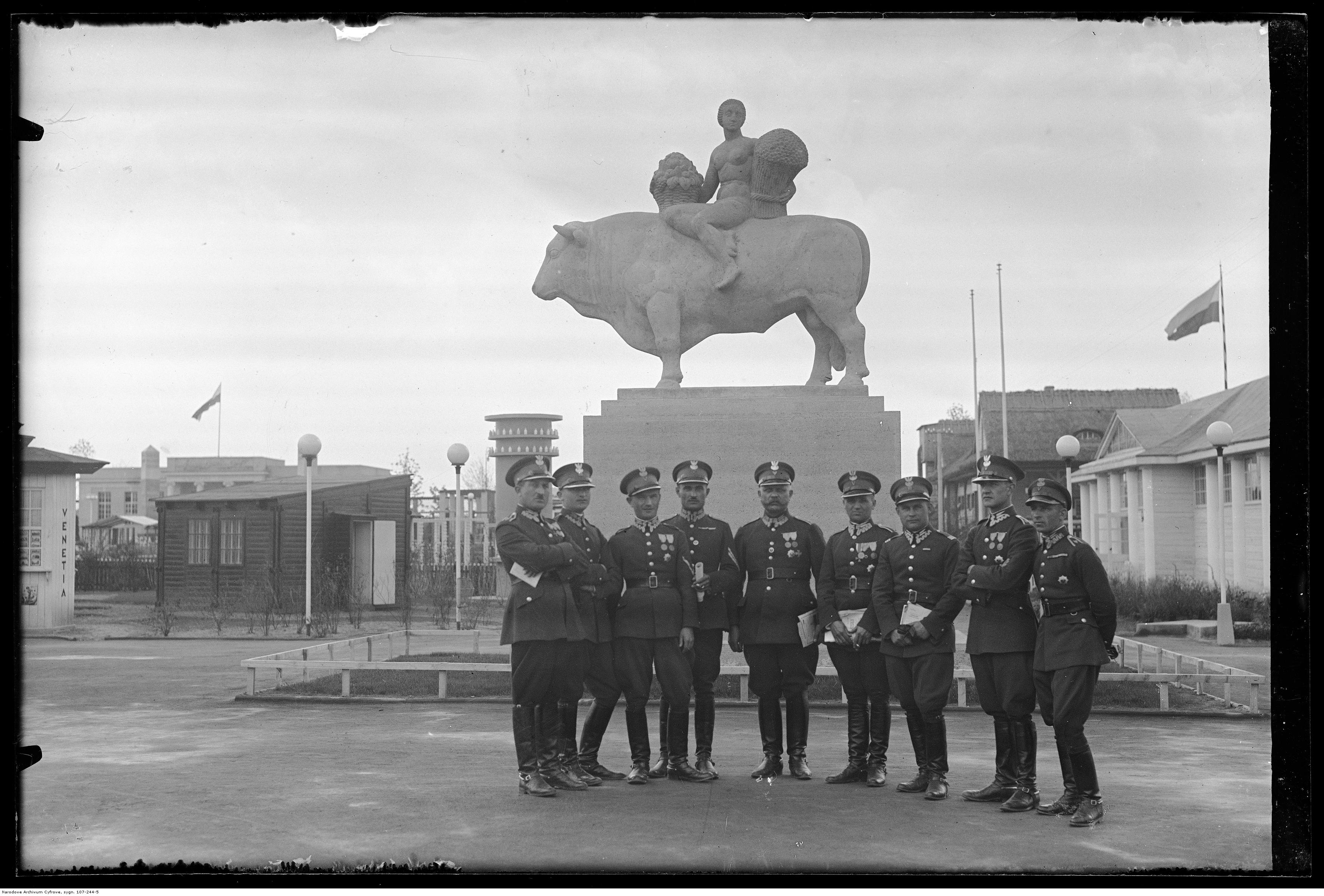
Non-commissioned Polish officers of the 1st Cavalry Regiment under the sculpture Agriculture at the Poznań Fair grounds (1929)

Also in 1929, he created three sculptures for the Poznań Fair grounds, allegories of industry, agriculture and forestry. Agriculture was symbolized by a woman seated on a bull, holding sheaves of grain in her hand; Industry was symbolized by a woman seated on a dolphin with fish in her hand; and Forestry by a European bison.

On 7 September 1929, the Monument to the Insurgents of the Greater Poland Uprising was unveiled in Szamotuły amidst great fanfare to a crowd of thousands. The town was decorated with flowers and national flags, culminating in a two-day celebration which included a parade. Chief of State and Marshal of Poland Józef Piłsudski sent telegrams, which were read to the crowd by the President of the Szamotuły District of the Society of Insurgents and Soldiers, Edward Müller. Józef Dowbor-Muśnicki, the military commander of the Greater Poland Uprising was among those in attendance for the unveiling. Mayor of Szamotuły, Konstanty Scholl, praised the erection of the monument and noted its future importance for the town.

In 1930, at the behest of the Silesian Parliament, he created busts of Silesian activists Karol Miarka, Józef Lompa, Paweł Stalmach and Józef Londzin.

=== The 1930s ===
Throughout the 1930s, Rożek created many monuments and other smaller sculptures and his monuments were known throughout Poland. He also took part in several foreign exhibitions. From 1928, a number of students began to train at Rożek's studio. Rożek worked on several reliefs with several of these students, including figures of the four patron saints of Poznań – Piotr, Paweł, Wojciech and Stanisław – on the tower of church of St. Martin of Tours in Poznań and above the altar of the Sacred Heart of Jesus. On 30 October 1932, the enormous Monument to the Sacred Heart of Jesus / Monument of Gratitude monument was unveiled in Adam Mickiewicz Square in Poznań. The monument itself, designed by architect Lucjan Michałowski, had the form of a triumphant arch, 12.5 meters high and 22 meters wide, with a 5.3-meter-tall (17 ft) bronze cast figure of Christ by Rożek, set on a 2-metre-high (6.6 ft) base on the front side, in the central recess. Rożek made two medallions also over the side spans. The medallion on the left side depicted Pope Pius XI, and on the right side depicted Polish Primate Edmund Dalbor. The northern side was decorated with bas-reliefs by sculptor Kazimiera Pajzderska. The figure of Christ from the monument was repeated by Rożek in altar sculpture in the church in Ostrów Wielkopolski.

Numerous commissions permitted Rożek to build a comfortable villa by his own design in 1934 with two spacious studios for himself on Stycznia Street in his hometown of Wolsztyn. There was a sculpting studio on the ground floor and a painting studio on the first floor. The windows of the studios overlooked the garden that reached the shore of Lake Wolsztyn. Along the path leading through the garden to the lake, Rożek placed busts of his favorite writers, musicians and philosophers, created by himself. In this new studio, he created the figure of fifteen Polish saints and blessed crowning the ceiling of Gniezno Cathedral and the bas-relief tympanum of Saint George and the Dragon above the entrance to the Church of St. George in Gniezno.

During the second half of the 1930s, he worked on a series of bas-reliefs of the Way of the Cross for St. Nicholas' Church in Krobia. One of the last surviving works created by Rożek before the German invasion of Poland in 1939 is the portrait head of Karol Kurpiński in 1938, which still adorns the foyer of the Grand Theatre, Poznań.

== World War II, arrest and death ==
In 1939, following the German invasion and defeat of Poland, Rożek was soon targeted by Nazi authorities, both because he belonged to the Polish creative intelligentsia, and for his close association with writer, journalist and nationalist politician Józef Kisielewski. Kisielewski's book Earth Gathers the Ashes had been published in the summer of that year, just prior to Germany's invasion, and was a strong critique of Nazi Germany.

Rożek left his home and studio in Wolsztyn and went into hiding with the aid of friends in Poznań, Objezierze and Tarnowo Podgórne. In late 1939, he traveled in secret to Wolsztyn, where one of his students informed him that the Germans had ransacked his home while searching for him, smashing many of his sculptures and throwing some into the lake just beyond his garden. He returned to hiding in Poznań and acquired false identity papers, working with underground Resistance movements in Wielkopolska and Silesia by creating leaflets and false stamps and frequently changed residences. In the autumn of 1941, he was arrested by the Gestapo in Tarnowo Podgórne and imprisoned at Fort VII prison and transit camp in Poznań. During his time in prison, he worked in the prison warehouse, issuing and repairing other prisoner's shoes. In his free time, he sketched portraits of fellow inmates. He was known to comfort inmates who were awaiting execution.

On 23 July 1943, Rożek was sent by transport to Auschwitz concentration camp from Fort VII after allegedly refusing to paint a portrait of Adolf Hitler by demand of the prison warden. He was registered within the camp as prisoner No. 131047. Rożek died in Auschwitz of exhaustion on 10 April 1944, aged 58. He never married or had children.

Many of Rożek's works were destroyed during the war, including the Monument to Bolesław the Brave which was razed during the German invasion. On 26 September 1939, the Monument to the Insurgents of the Greater Poland Uprising was one of two structures blown up by the Germans in Szamotuły, the other being the town's synagogue. The Monument to the Sacred Heart of Jesus / Monument of Gratitude was demolished in October 1939 by a decision of the Third Reich administration occupying Wielkopolska and the central figure of Christ was melted down. During the demolition, Polish workers were able to save the two fingers of the sculpture in the benediction position, and they are currently housed at the Archdiocese Museum in Poznań.

== Legacy ==
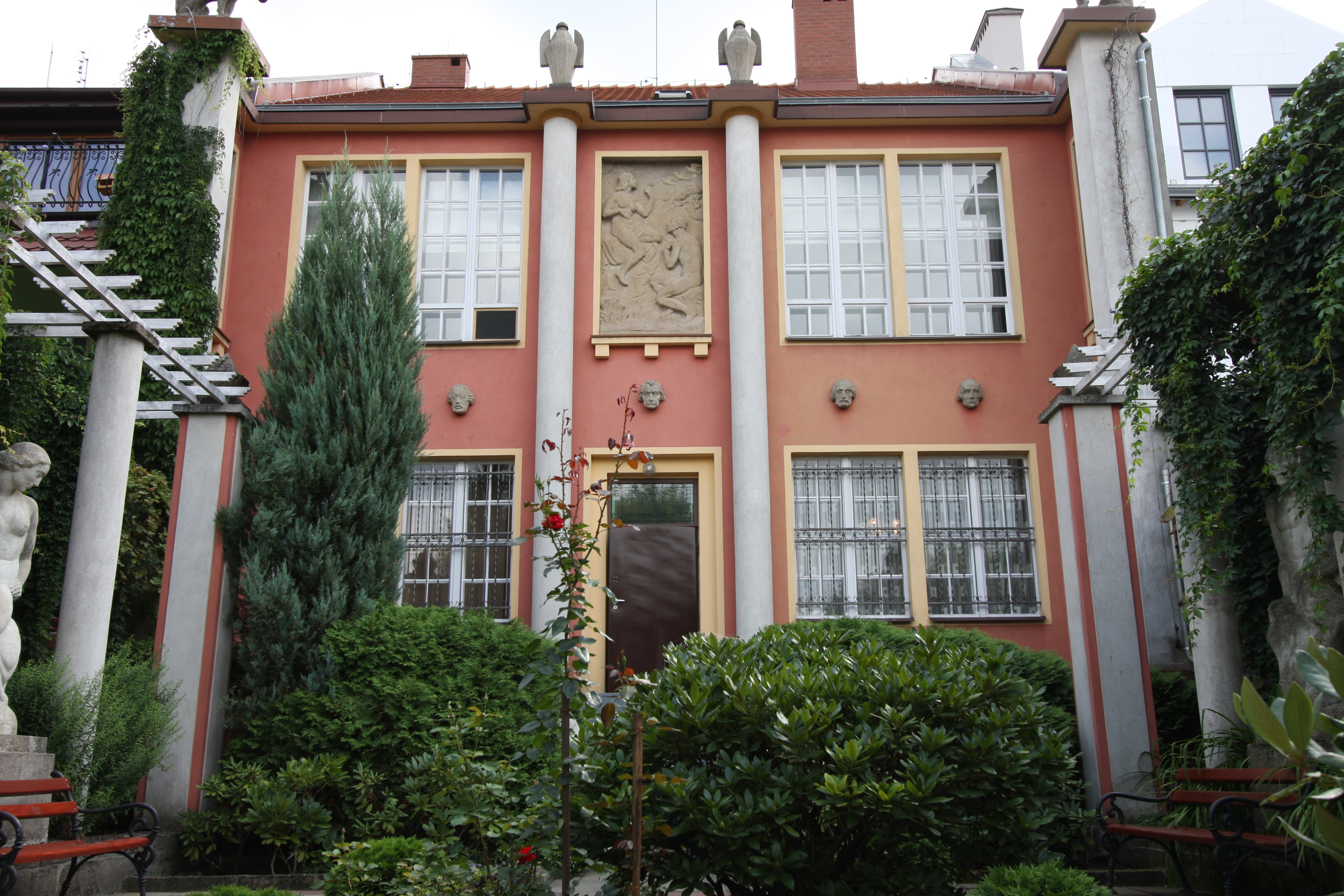
The Marcin Rożek Museum in Wolsztyn which opened in 1968

In 1968, authorities of the city of Wolsztyn established the Marcin Rożek Museum at Rożek's former villa which includes a permanent exhibition devoted to the life and work of Rożek, and two rooms are intended for temporary exhibitions. The original works that helped to establish the museum were largely from the private collection of Rożek's sister, Jadwiga Rożek.

Sculptor Jerzy Sobociński reconstructed Rożek's Monument to Bolesław the Brave from a prototype and the sculpture was unveiled on 9 May 1985 on Jan Łaski Street in Gniezno, where it had stood before its demolition in 1939.

In 2007, a meter high bas-relief of Saint Joseph created by Rożek was rediscovered at a church in Czacz. The small relief had previously only been known from photographs taken prior to World War II that were held by the Marcin Rożek Museum.

Since 8 November 2017, the Primary School Marcin Rożek in Kosieczyn bears his name.

== Gallery ==
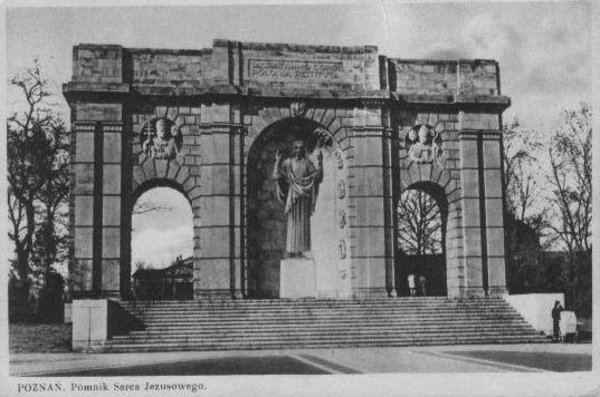
Monument to the Sacred Heart of Jesus / Monument of Gratitude in Poznań (1932), designed by architect Lucjan Michałowski, with the central figure of Christ and two opposing medallions by Rożek and further medallions and reliefs by Rożek and Kazimiera Pajzderska. Destroyed in 1939

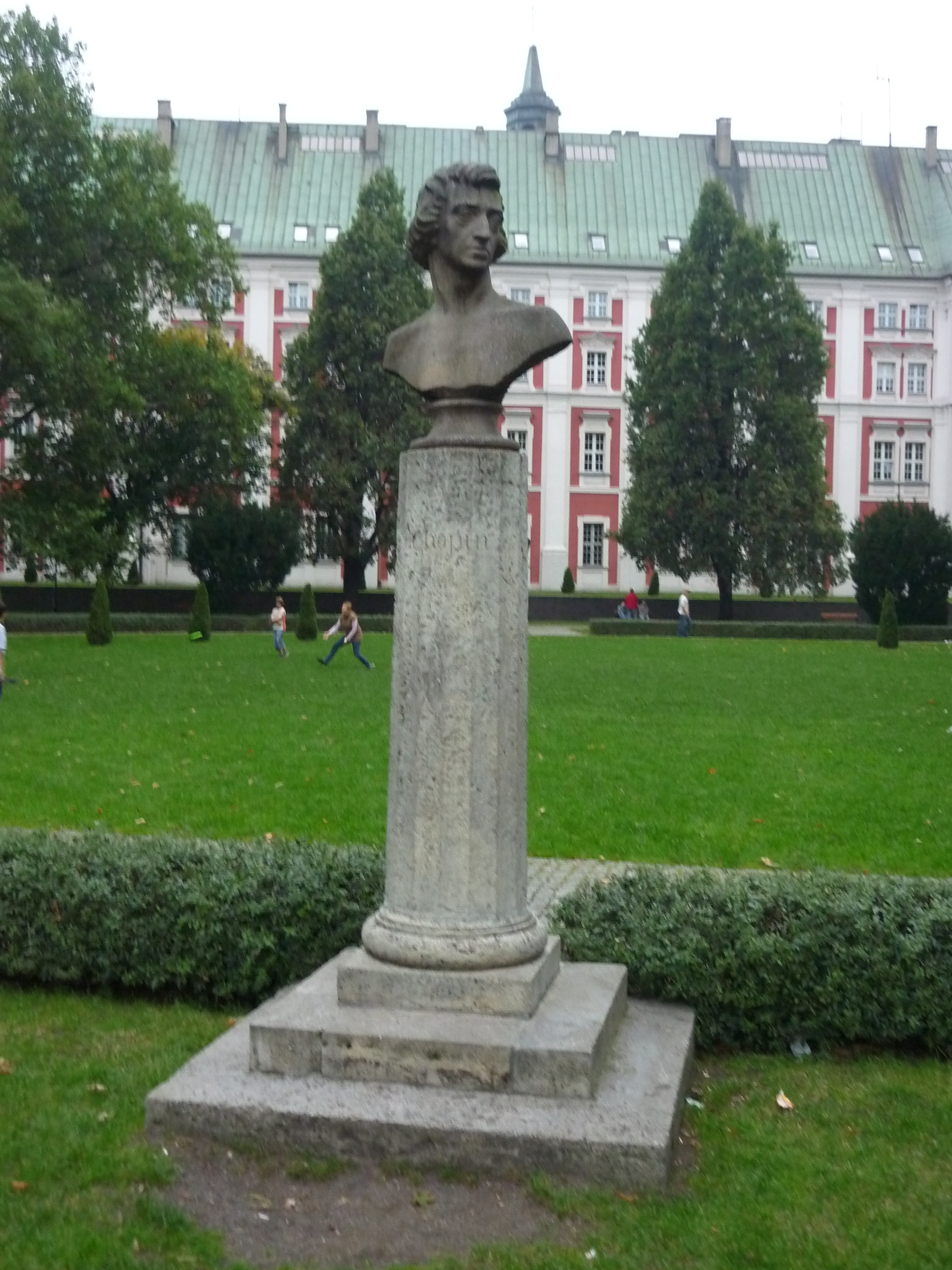
Fryderyk Chopin Monument in Poznań (1923)

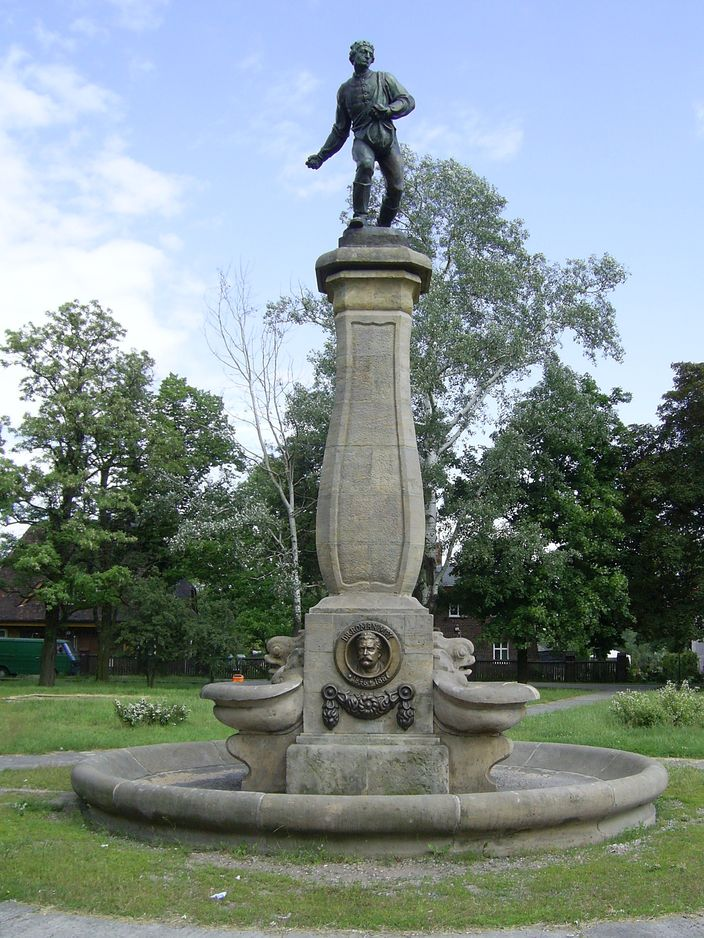
The Sower's Monument in Luboń (1923)

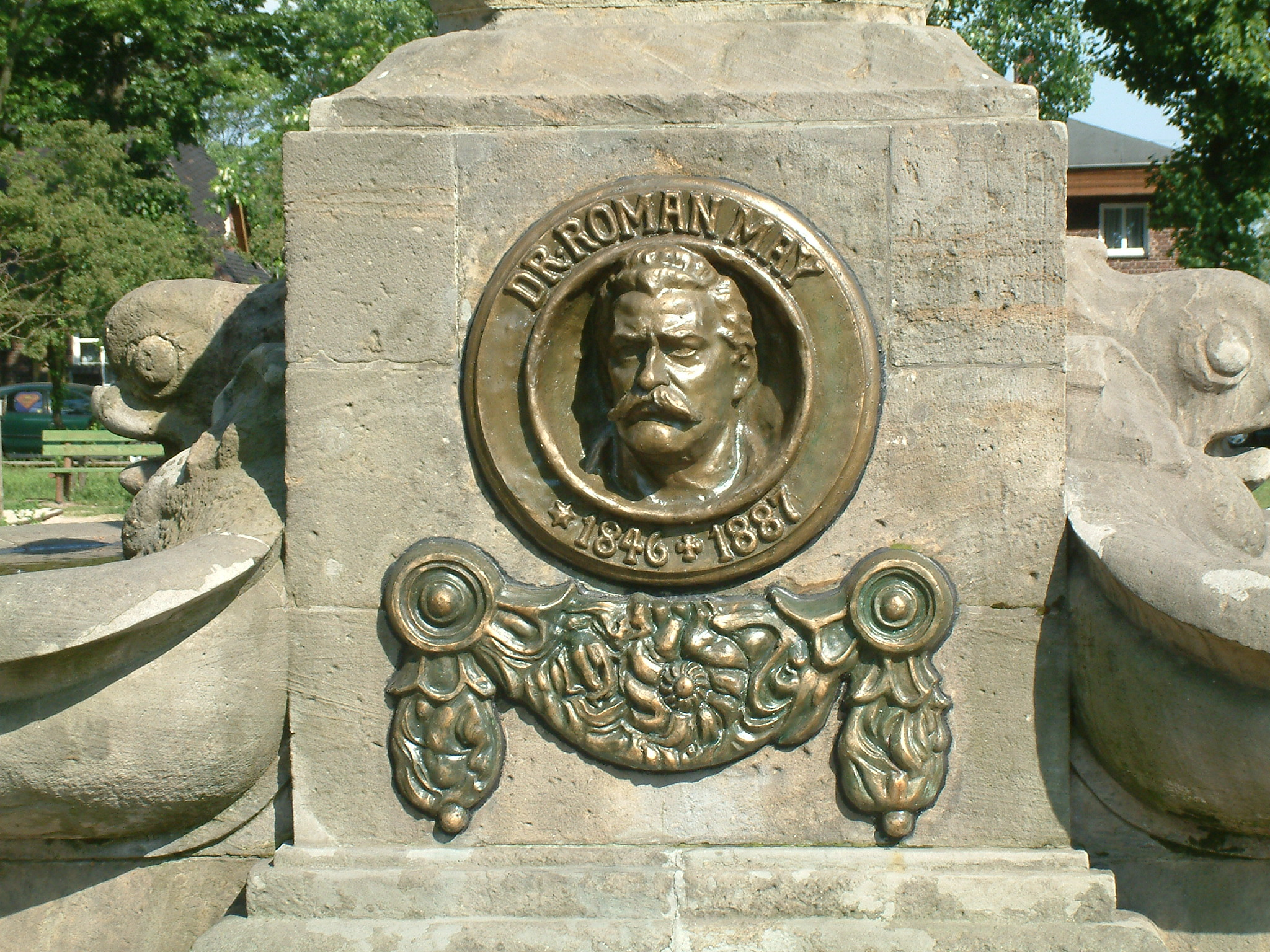
Detail of medallion of chemist, teacher, social activist and industrialist Roman May on The Sower's Monument in Luboń (1923).

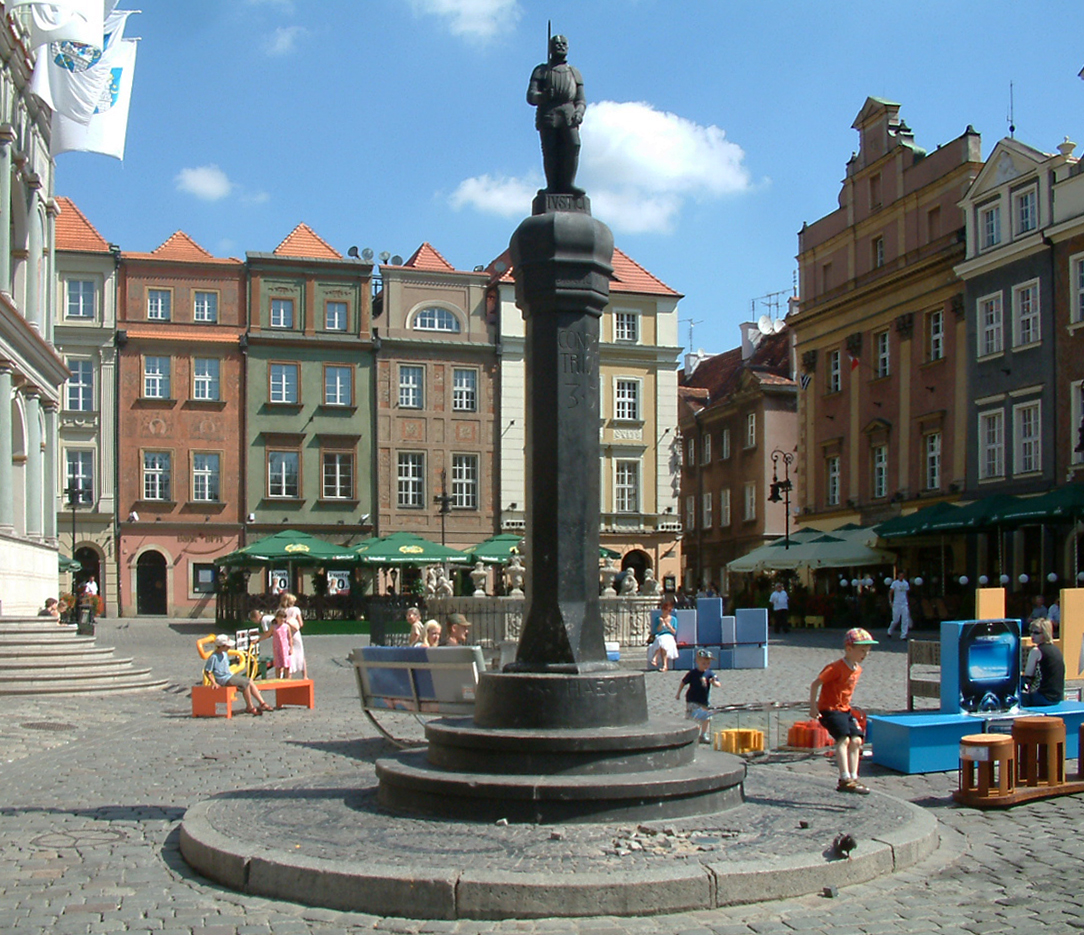
Replica of the Pillory in Poznań created by Marcin Rożek (1925)

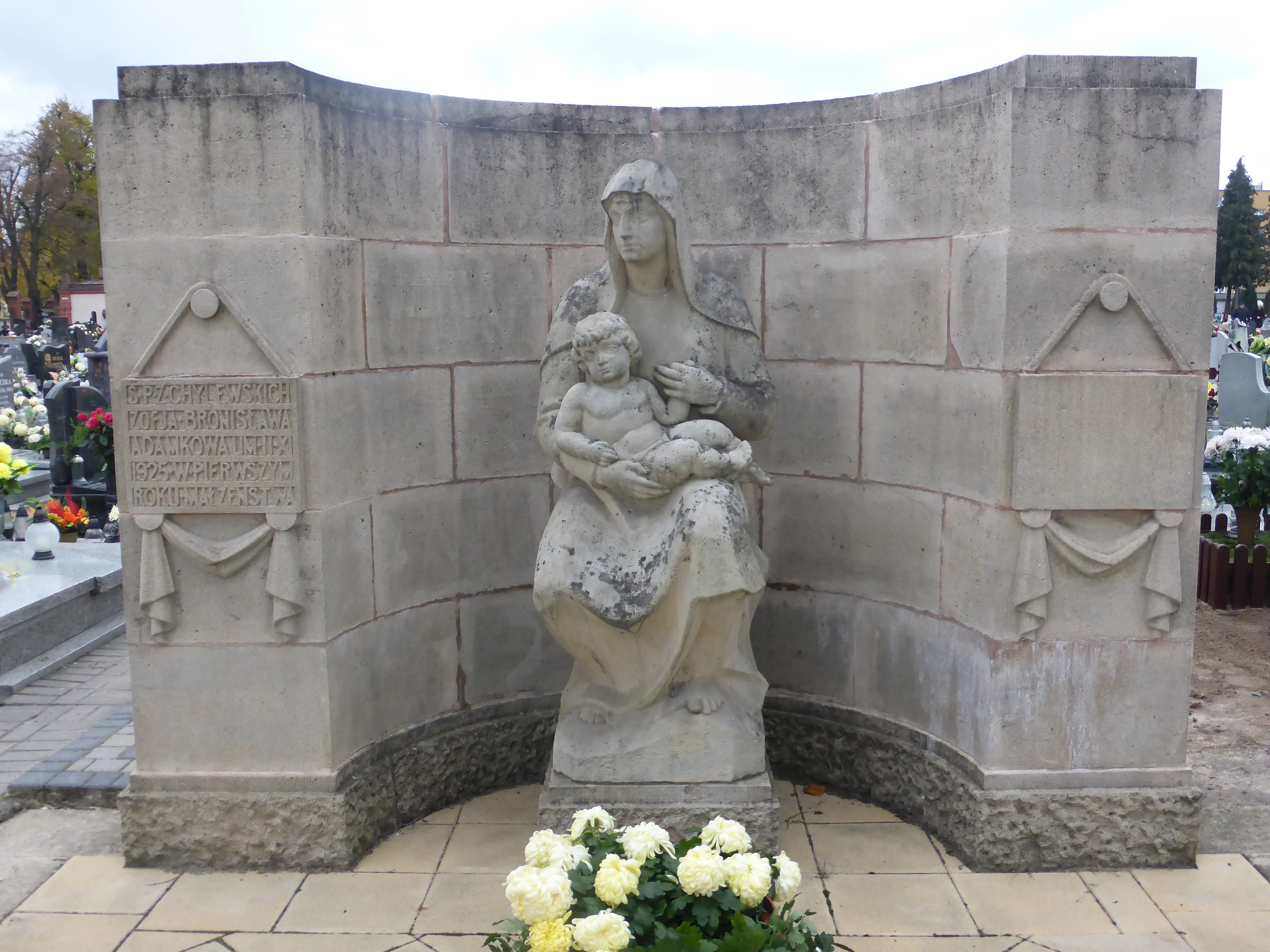
Tomb of Zofja Adamkowa in Grodzisk Wielkopolski (1925)

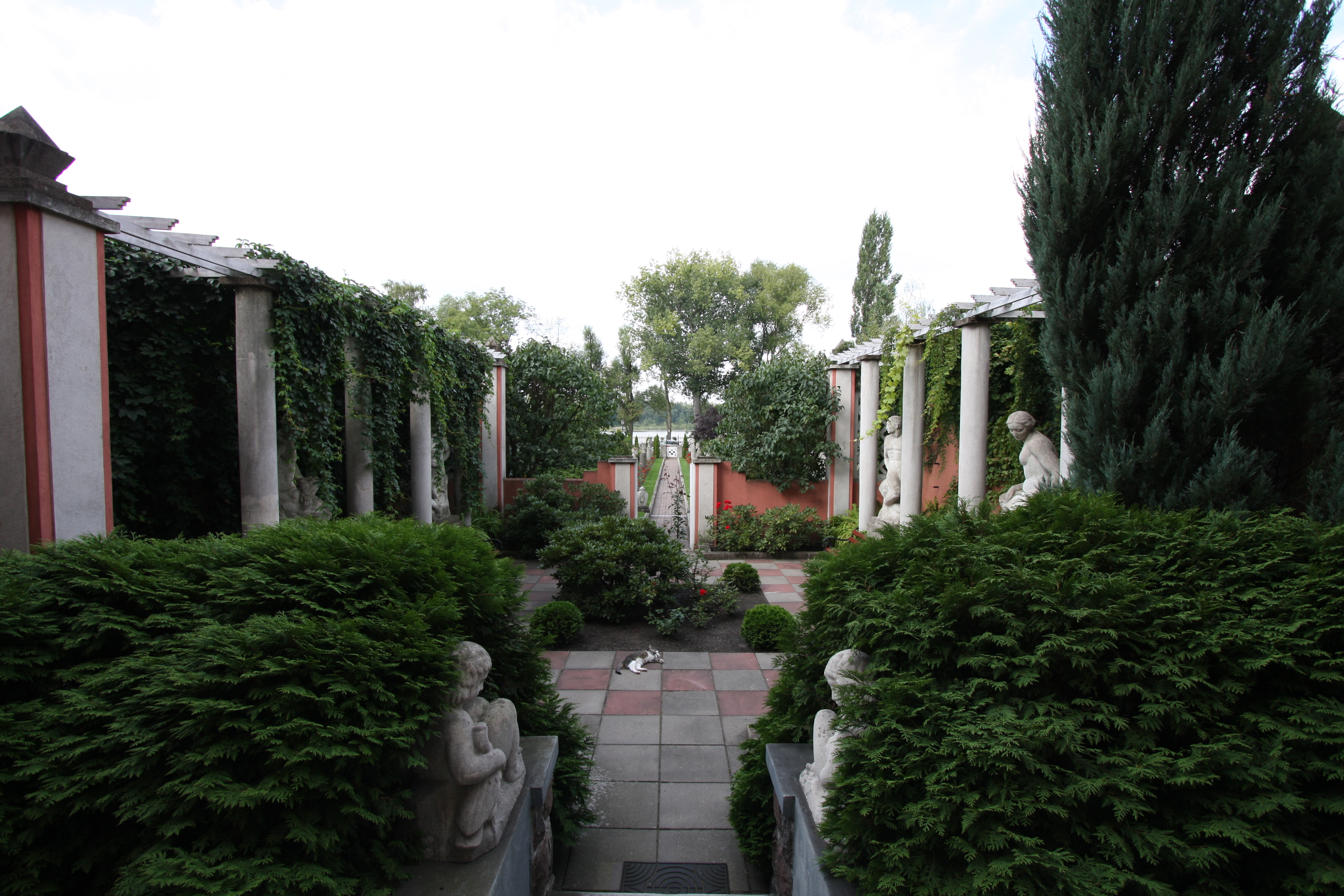
The back garden of Rożek's villa (currently, the Marcin Rożek Museum) leading to Lake Wolsztyn at 34, 5 Stycznia Street in Wolsztyn, lined with numerous busts and sculptures created by Rożek

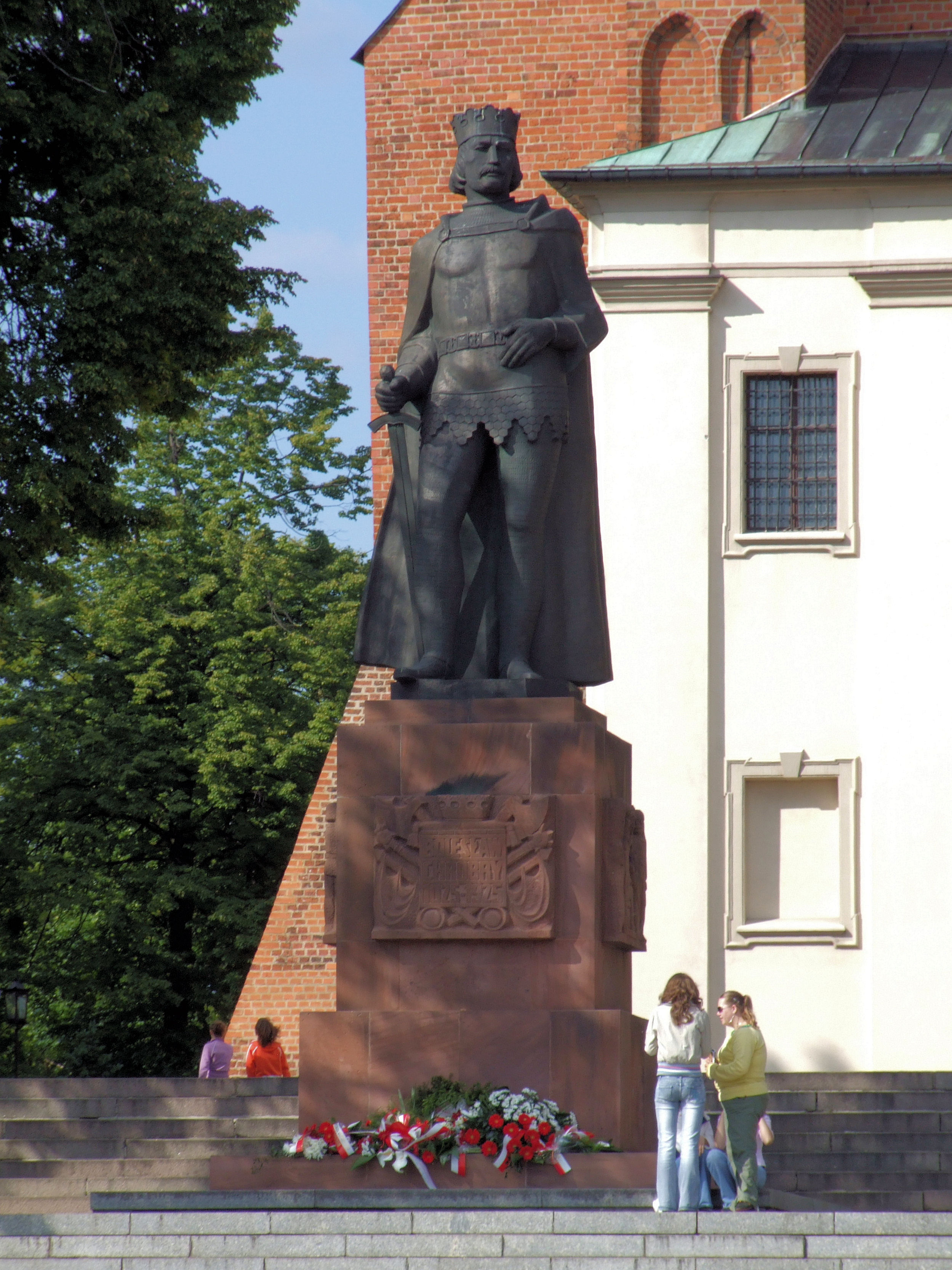
1985 reconstruction of the Monument to Bolesław the Brave by Jerzy Sobociński in Gniezno
