= Gmina Zbąszynek =

Administrative district in Poland

Gmina Zbąszynek Zbąszynek Commune
- Gmina
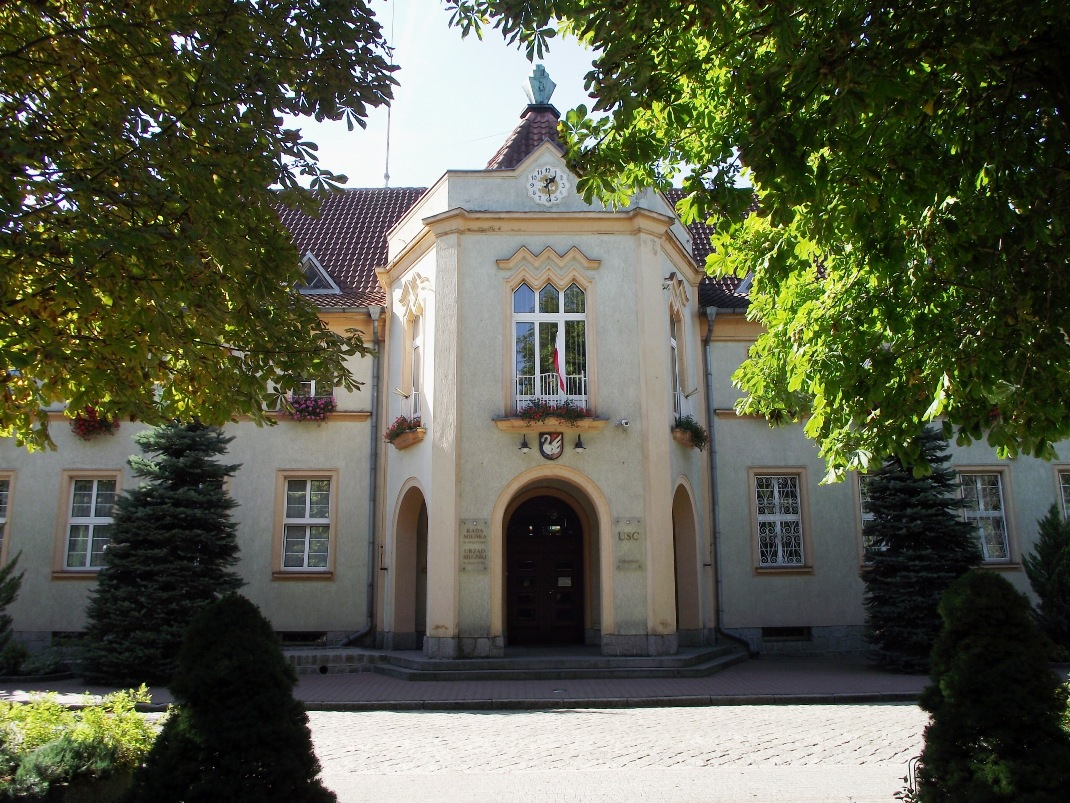
- Gmina office in Zbąszynek

- Coat of arms
- Interactive map of Gmina Zbąszynek
- Coordinates (Zbąszynek): 52°15′N 15°49′E
- Country: Poland
- Voivodeship: Lubusz
- County: Świebodzin
- Seat: Zbąszynek

Area
  - Total: 94.42 km^{2} (36.46 sq mi)

Population (2019-06-30)
  - Total: 8,292
  - Density: 87.82/km^{2} (227.5/sq mi)
  - Urban: 5,020
  - Rural: 3,272
- Time zone: UTC+1 (CET)
  - Summer (DST): UTC+2 (CEST)
- Vehicle registration: FSW
- Website: www.zbaszynek.pl

Gmina Zbąszynek is an urban-rural gmina (administrative district) in Świebodzin County, Lubusz Voivodeship, in western Poland. Its seat is the town of Zbąszynek, which lies approximately 20 kilometres (12 mi) east of Świebodzin, 41 km (25 mi) north-east of Zielona Góra, and 66 km (41 mi) south-east of Gorzów Wielkopolski.

The gmina covers an area of 94.42 square kilometres (36.5 sq mi), and as of 2019 its total population is 8,292.

== Villages ==
Apart from the town of Zbąszynek, Gmina Zbąszynek contains the villages and settlements of Boleń, Bronikowo, Chlastawa, Dąbrówka Wielkopolska, Depot, Kosieczyn, Kręcka Winnica, Kręcko, Nowy Gościniec, Rogoziniec, Samsonki and Stradzewo.

== Neighbouring gminas ==
Gmina Zbąszynek is bordered by the gminas of Babimost, Szczaniec, Trzciel and Zbąszyń.

== Twin towns – sister cities ==
Gmina Zbąszynek is twinned with:

- Bedum (Groningen), Netherlands
- Peitz, Germany
- Zbąszyń, Poland
