= Paul Rostock =

Nazi official (1892–1956)

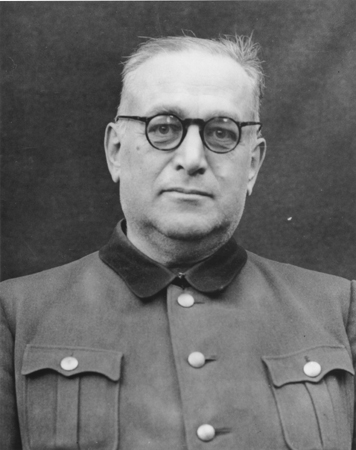
- Mugshot of Rostock
- Born: 18 January 1892; Kranz, German Empire
- Died: 17 June 1956 (aged 64); Bad Tölz, West Germany
- Occupation: Surgeon
- Political party: Nazi Party
- Status: Acquitted
- Criminal charges: Conspiracy against peace War crimes Crimes against humanity
- Trial: Doctors' Trial

Paul Rostock (18 January 1892 – 17 June 1956) was a German physician, official, and university professor. He was chief of the Office for Medical Science and Research (Amtschef der Dienststelle Medizinische Wissenschaft und Forschung) under Third Reich Commissioner and war criminal Karl Brandt and a full professor, medical doctorate, medical superintendent of the University of Berlin Surgical Clinic.

After the end of World War II, he was tried as a war criminal in the Doctors' Trial for his complicity in medical atrocities performed on concentration camp prisoners, where he was acquitted.

== Education and Nazi Party membership ==
Rostock was born in Kranz, Meseritz district, German Empire. He studied medicine in Greifswald and completed his medical doctorate at Jena in 1921. He received his medical license and became an intern at the University of Jena Surgical Clinic. From 1927 to 1933, Rostock was assistant medical director at Bergmannsheil Hospital in Bochum and worked with Karl Brandt, who was at that time an intern there. In 1933, Rostock took on the position of medical superintendent in Berlin and in 1941 became associate professor and director of the University of Berlin Surgical Clinic in Ziegel Street, where Karl Brandt was then working as assistant medical director. Rostock became dean of the medical faculty at the University of Berlin in 1942.

Rostock joined the Nazi Party on May 1, 1937 (No. 5,917,621) and the National Socialist German Physicians Association on February 20, 1940 (Nr. 31,569).

Rostock's military medical career began in 1939 with a position as Consulting Surgeon to the Wehrmacht. In 1943, General Commissioner Karl Brandt chose Rostock as his deputy and representative in the Medical Science Research Department.

== Doctors' Trial and later years ==
Rostock was a defendant in the Doctors' Trial. Because of his very high position, Rostock was charged with complicity in several series of human experiments on concentration camp prisoners. He was acquitted and released in August 1947.

He immediately began to work on documentation of the Doctors' Trial, with the goal of presenting the trial to the public from another perspective. Rostock never finished this project.

In 1948, Rostock began working as medical supervisor of Versehrten Hospital in Possenhofen. He then worked as the medical supervisor of Versorgungs Hospital in Bayreuth, from 1953 to his death at age 64 in Bad Tölz.

== See also ==
- Doctors' Trial
- Nazi human experimentation
