= Kręcko =

- Village
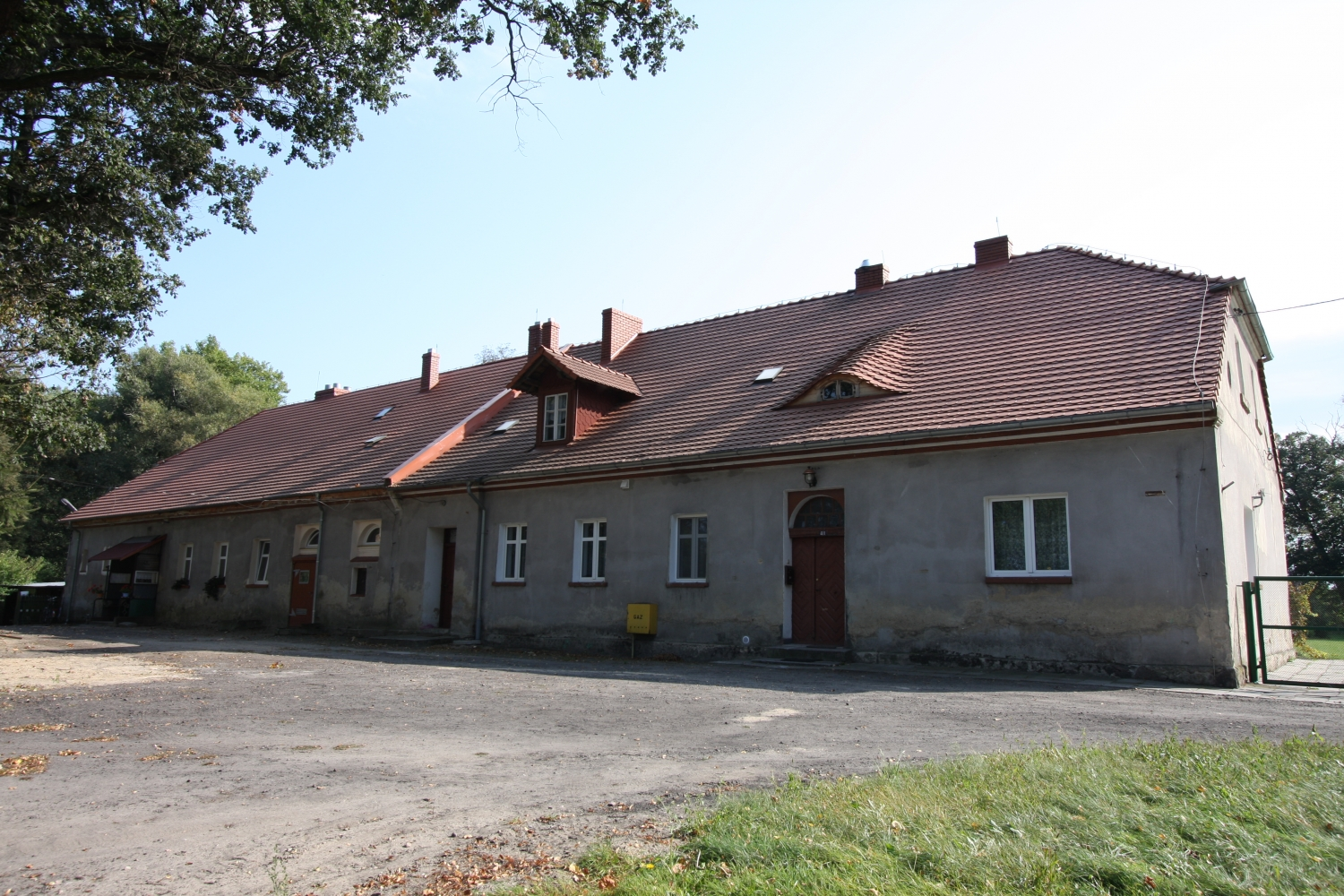
- Manor

- Location within Poland
- Coordinates: 52°13′N 15°47′E
- Country: Poland
- Voivodeship: Lubusz
- County: Świebodzin
- Gmina: Zbąszynek

Kręcko [ˈkrɛnt͡skɔ] is a village in the administrative district of Gmina Zbąszynek, within Świebodzin County, Lubusz Voivodeship, in western Poland.

== Notable residents ==
- Paul Rostock (1892–1956), German physician and war criminal
