= Kosieczyn =

- Village
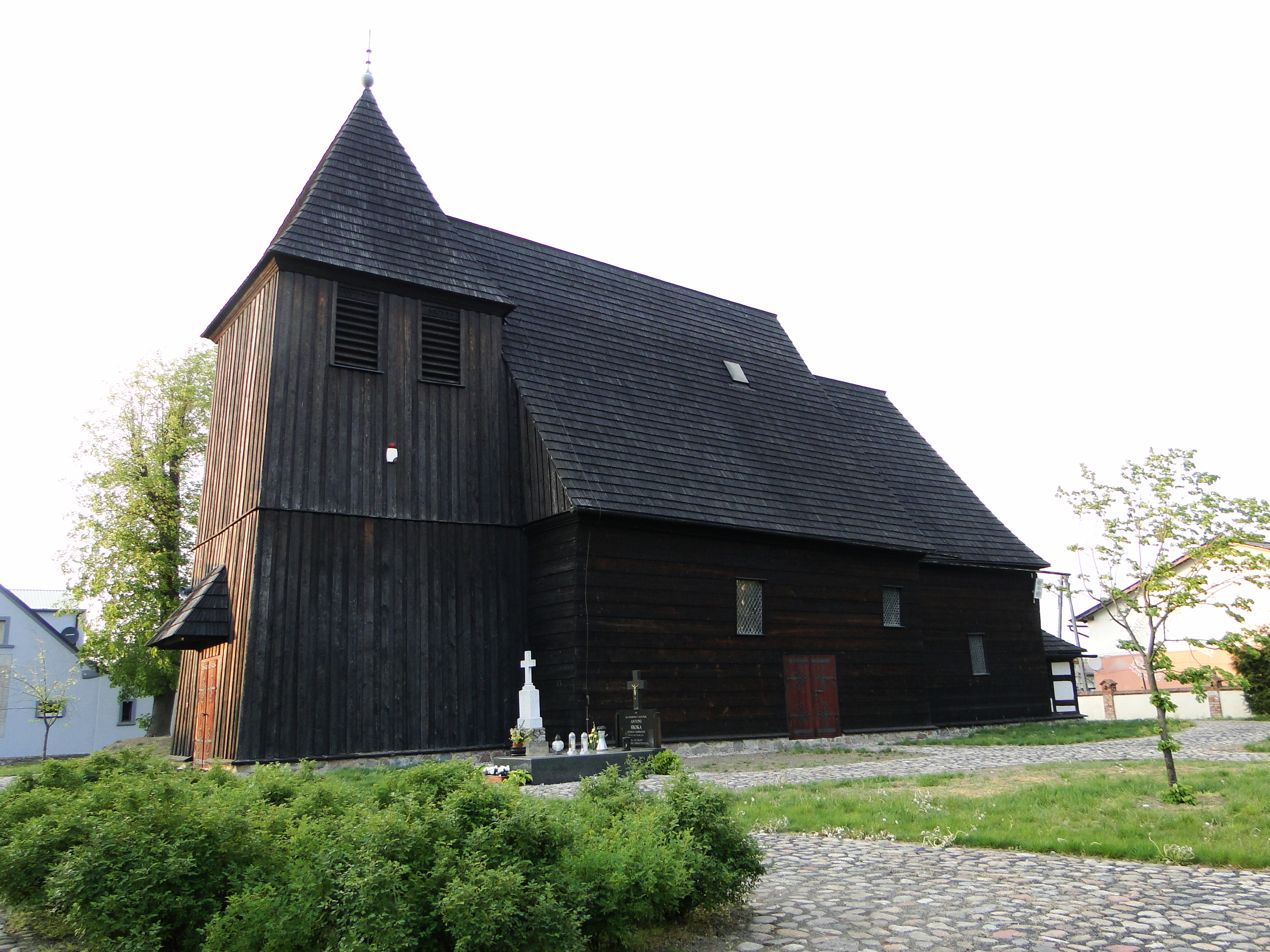
- Church of Saints Simon and Jude from the early 15th century

- Location within Poland
- Coordinates: 52°13′N 15°49′E
- Country: Poland
- Voivodeship: Lubusz
- County: Świebodzin
- Gmina: Zbąszynek
- Population: 950

Kosieczyn [kɔˈɕɛt͡ʂɨn] is a village in the administrative district of Gmina Zbąszynek, within Świebodzin County, Lubusz Voivodeship, in western Poland.

Polish sculptor and painter Marcin Rożek (1885–1944) was born in Kosieczyn.
