= Samsonki =

- Settlement
- Location within Poland
- Coordinates: 52°16′29″N 15°51′33″E
- Country: Poland
- Voivodeship: Lubusz
- County: Świebodzin
- Gmina: Zbąszynek

Samsonki [samˈsɔnki] is a settlement in the administrative district of Gmina Zbąszynek, within Świebodzin County, Lubusz Voivodeship, in western Poland.
