= Zbąszynek =

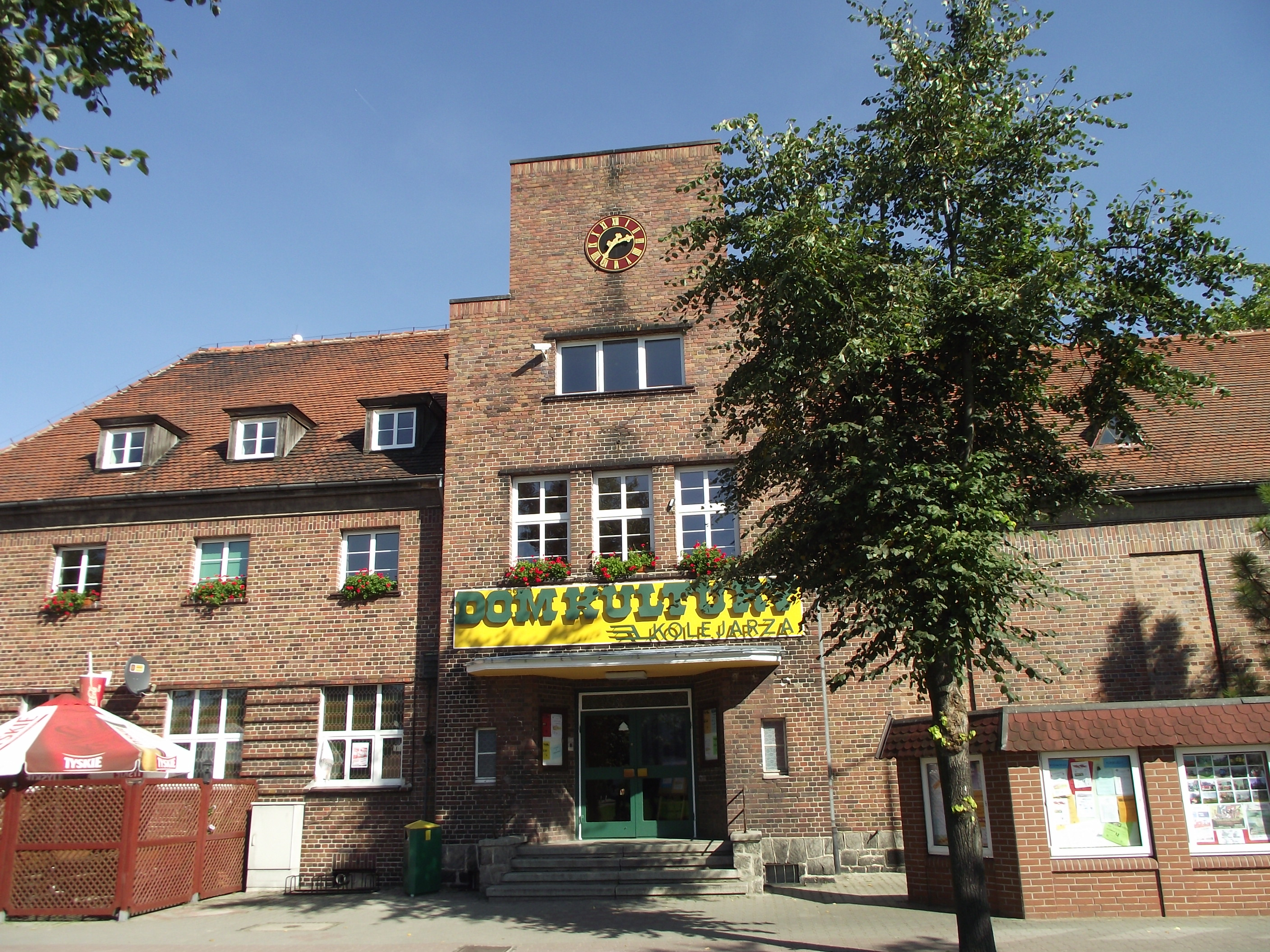
- Culture centre

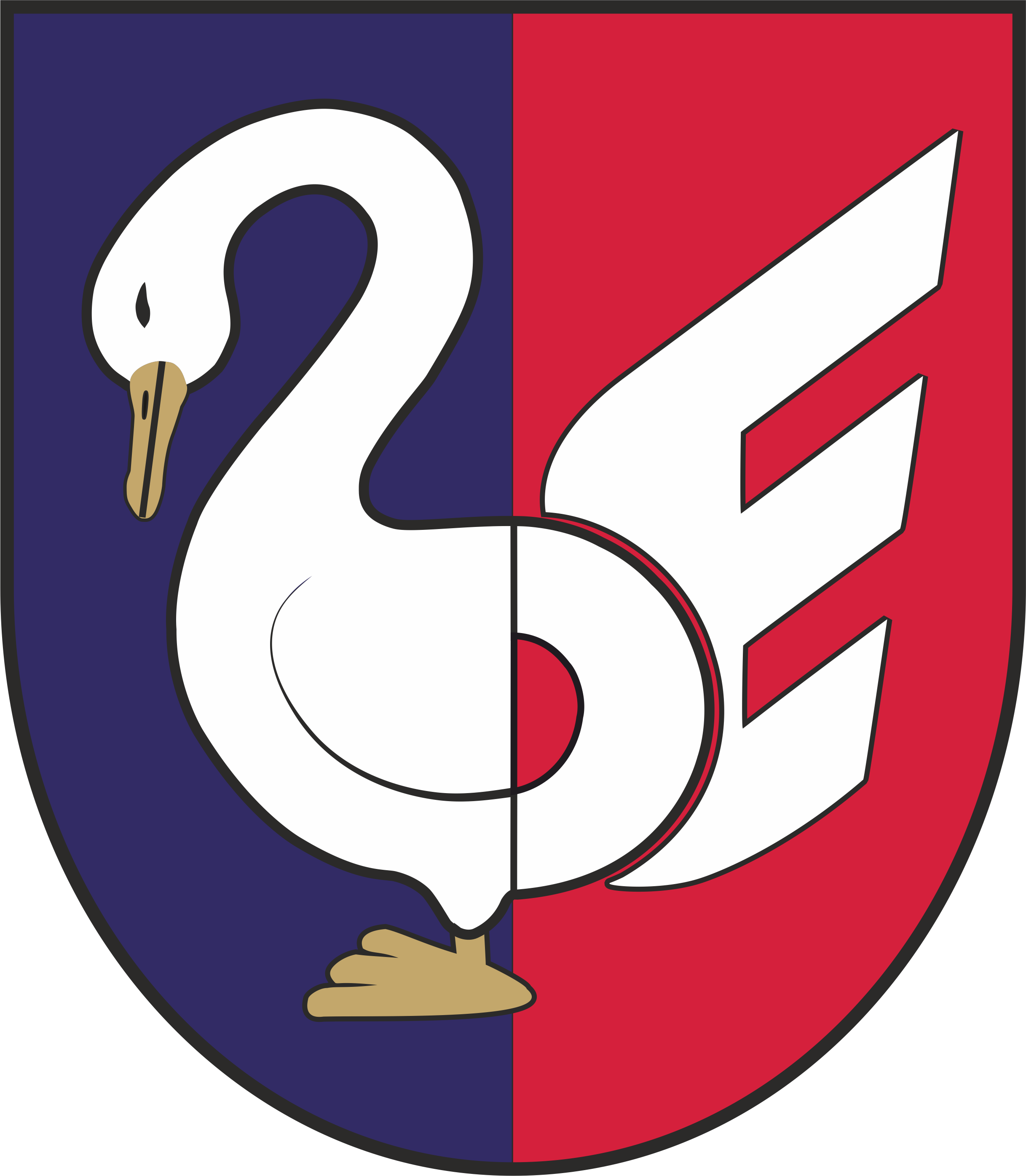
- Flag Coat of arms

- Location within Poland
- Coordinates: 52°15′N 15°49′E
- Country: Poland
- Voivodeship: Lubusz
- County: Świebodzin
- Gmina: Zbąszynek

Area
  - Total: 2.76 km^{2} (1.07 sq mi)

Population (2019-06-30)
  - Total: 5,020
  - Density: 1,820/km^{2} (4,710/sq mi)
- Time zone: UTC+1 (CET)
  - Summer (DST): UTC+2 (CEST)
- Postal code: 66-210
- Area code: +48 68
- Vehicle registration: FSW
- Website: http://www.zbaszynek.pl

Zbąszynek (pronounced [zbɔ̃ˈʂɨnɛk]; German: Neu Bentschen) is a town in western Poland, in Lubusz Voivodeship, in Świebodzin County. As of 2019, it has 5,020 inhabitants. It is located within the historic region of Greater Poland.

== History ==
Historical population
Year	Pop.	±%
1946	2,091	—
1950	2,345	+12.1%
1960	2,996	+27.8%
2010	5,042	+68.3%

The territory became a part of the emerging Polish state under its first historic ruler Mieszko I in the 10th century. It formed part of the Kościan County in the Poznań Voivodeship in the Greater Poland Province until the Second Partition of Poland in 1793, when it was annexed by Prussia. After the successful Greater Poland uprising of 1806, it was regained by the Poles and included within the short-lived Duchy of Warsaw. Following the duchy's dissolution, it was re-annexed by Prussia, and from 1871 it was also part of Germany.

The town was founded in the early 1920s when, as a result of the Treaty of Versailles, the railroad hub in nearby Zbąszyń (Bentschen) became again part of the Second Polish Republic. In 1922, the government of Weimar Germany decided to build a new border station, a new rail hub (which replaced Zbaszyn) as well as a settlement for railroad workers. Within a few years in 1923–30, a large station was constructed, together with a modern suburban type settlement, based on a project by architect Friedrich Veil. The town, named Neu Bentschen, was inhabited by ethnic German railroad workers. There were two churches, a printing shop, a house of culture (Deutsches Haus), a school, a mail office and a bank. The settlement belonged to the Meseritz county.

It was from German Neu-Bentschen (now Zbąszynek) that thousands of Polish Jews expelled from Germany in October, 1938, were forced into Polish Zbąszyń, among them the parents of Herschel Grynszpan.

=== World War II ===
Following the invasion of Poland in World War II, the Germans opened a forced labour camp in Zbąszynek, in which various categories of prisoners were kept including POWs from France, Italy, and, after 1941, from the Soviet Union, as well as Jews from the Łódź Ghetto. Hundreds died of diseases and exhaustion. Those who survived, worked on the rail infrastructure, which was necessary for transports to the Eastern front.

In January 1945 some German inhabitants of Neu Bentschen fled the advancing Red Army and the town was captured without fighting. As a result of the territorial changes of Poland immediately after World War II following the Potsdam Conference, it was transferred to Poland. The remaining populace was expelled to Germany in accordance with the Potsdam Agreement. Neu Bentschen was briefly called Nowy Zbąszyń, some time in the late 1940s, the name was changed to Zbąszynek.

== Twin towns – sister cities ==
See twin towns of Gmina Zbąszynek.

== Gallery ==
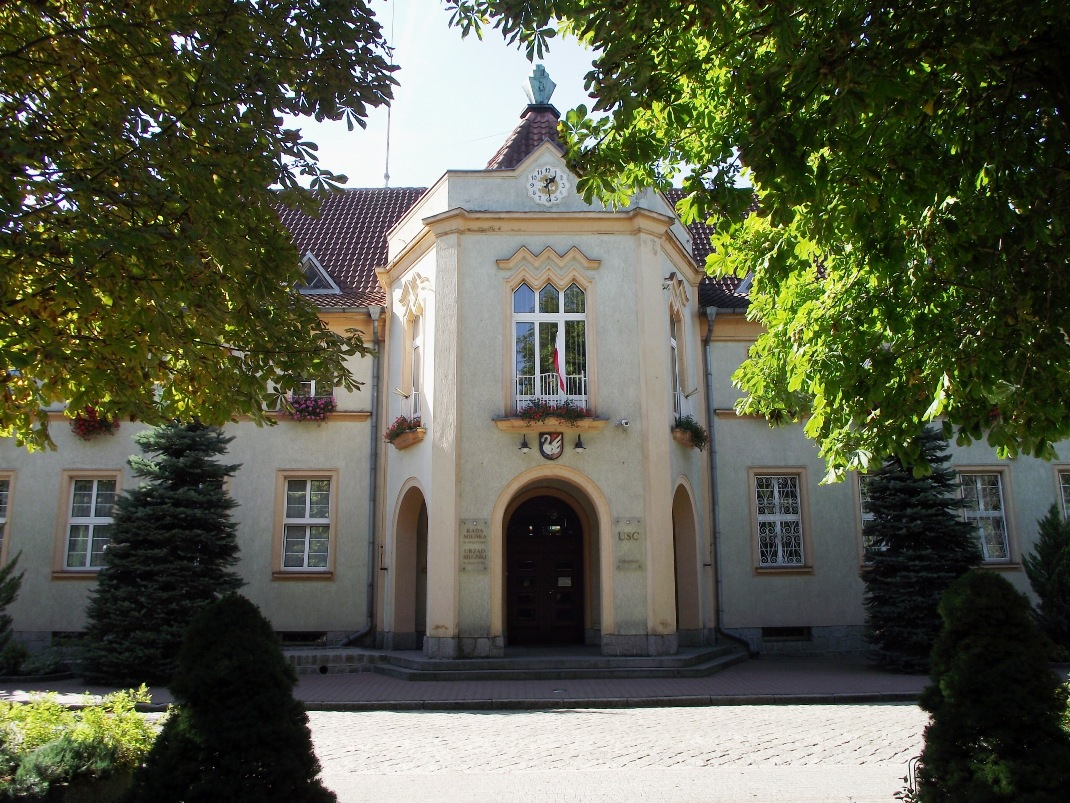
Municipal office

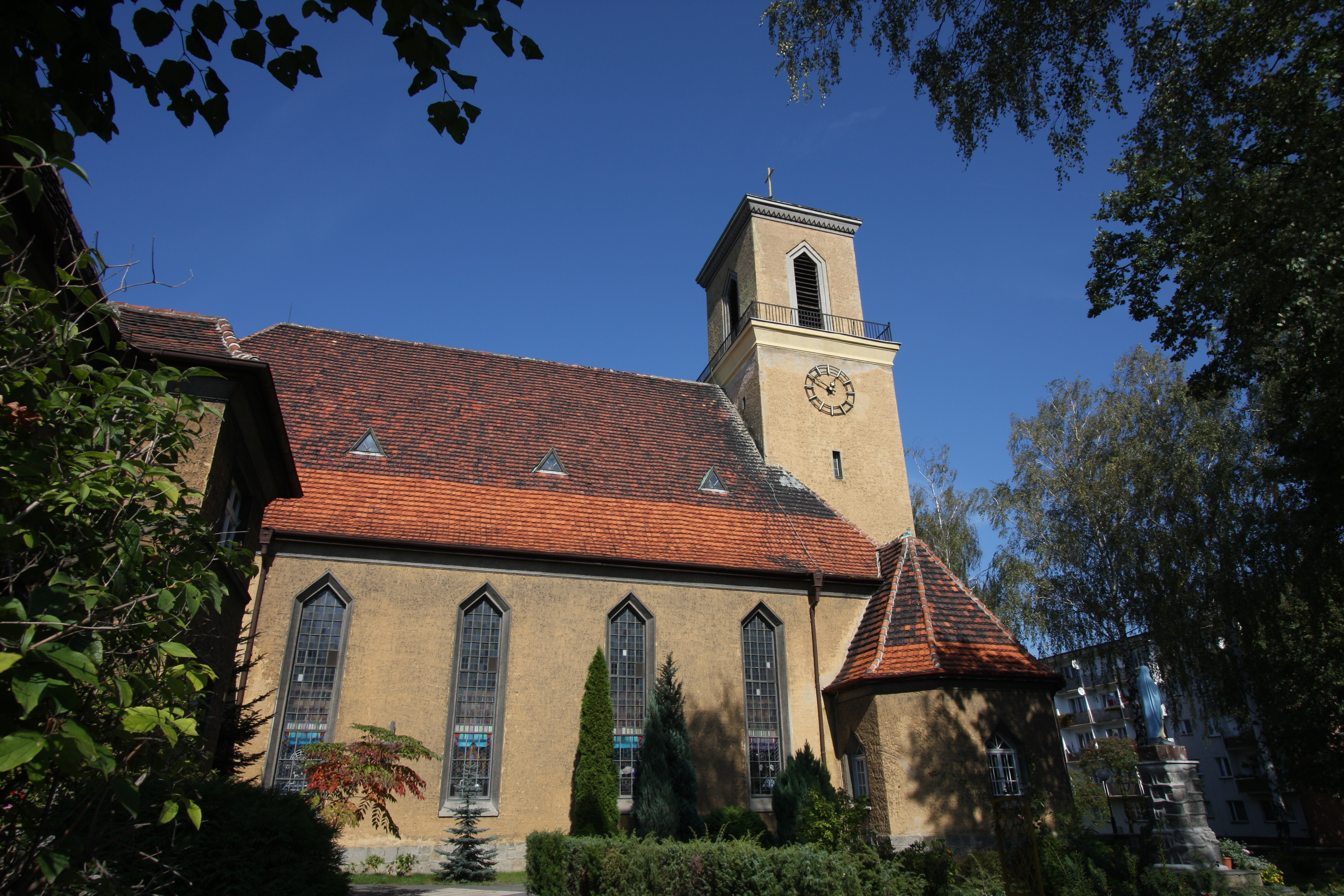
Saint Mary church of the Maternity

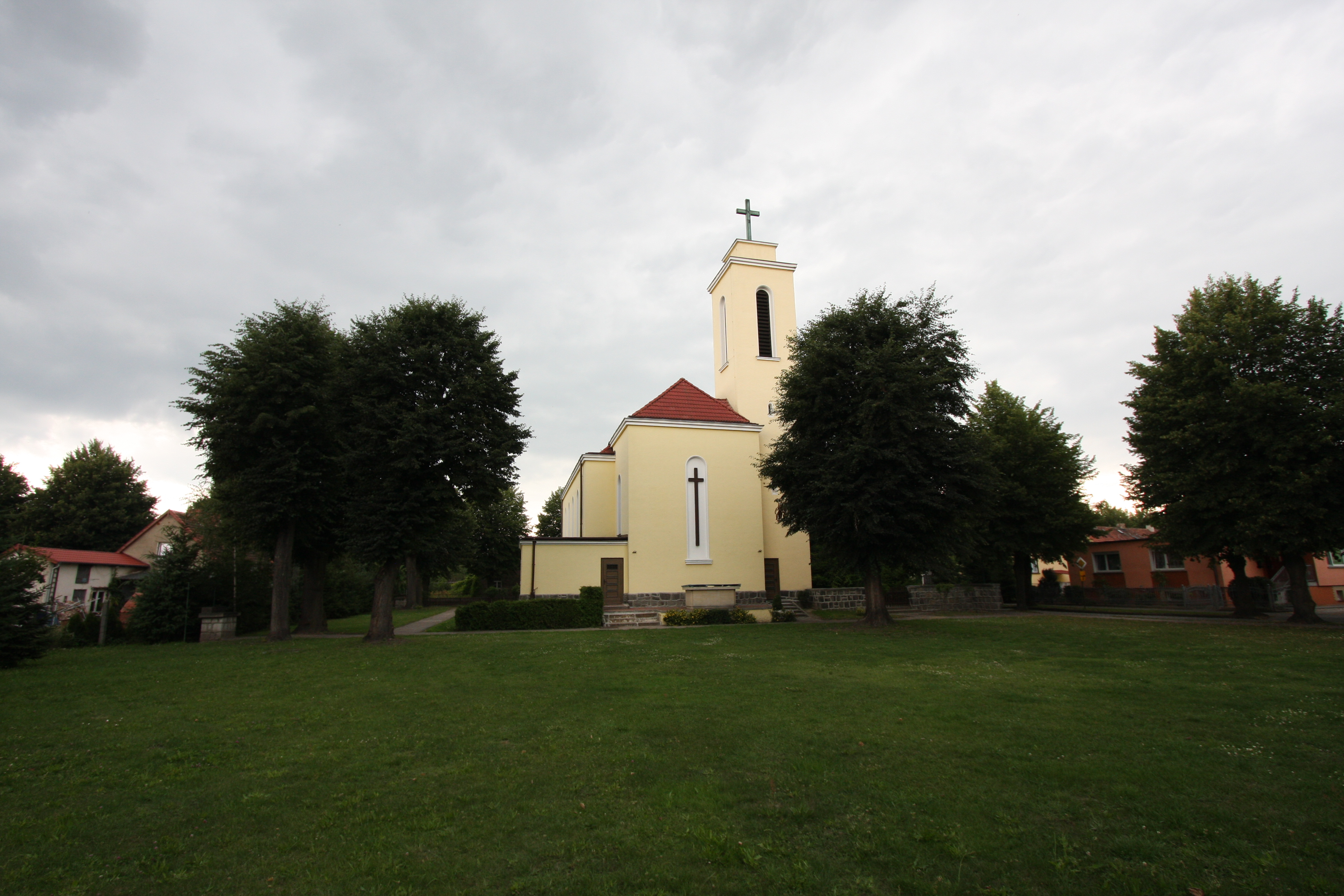
Saints Peter and Paul church

== See also ==
- German–Polish customs war
