= Kręcka Winnica =

- Settlement
- Location within Poland
- Coordinates: 52°12′24″N 15°46′11″E
- Country: Poland
- Voivodeship: Lubusz
- County: Świebodzin
- Gmina: Zbąszynek

Kręcka Winnica [ˈkrɛnt͡ska vinˈnit͡sa] is a settlement in the administrative district of Gmina Zbąszynek, within Świebodzin County, Lubusz Voivodeship, in western Poland.
