= Stradzewo, Lubusz Voivodeship =

Stradzewo
- Village
- Location within Poland
- Coordinates: 52°12′8″N 15°45′33″E
- Country: Poland
- Voivodeship: Lubusz
- County: Świebodzin
- Gmina: Zbąszynek
- Population: 30

Stradzewo [straˈd͡zɛvɔ] is a village in the administrative district of Gmina Zbąszynek, within Świebodzin County, Lubusz Voivodeship, in western Poland.
