= Nowy Gościniec =

- Village
- Location within Poland
- Coordinates: 52°14′25″N 15°46′50″E
- Country: Poland
- Voivodeship: Lubusz
- County: Świebodzin
- Gmina: Zbąszynek
- Population: 60

Nowy Gościniec (Polish: [ˈnɔvɨ ɡɔɕˈt͡ɕiɲɛt͡s]) is a village in the administrative district of Gmina Zbąszynek, within Świebodzin County, Lubusz Voivodeship, in western Poland.
