= The Depot (disambiguation) =

The Depot is a musical venue in the Salt Lake City Union Pacific Depot.

The Depot could also refer to:

- Magnolia station, a historic train station in Magnolia, Mississippi
- Station Theatre (Urbana) in Urbana, Illinois
- The Depot at Cleburne Station, a baseball park in Cleburne, Texas
- The Depot, part of Museum Boijmans Van Beuningen in Rotterdam

== See also ==
- Depot (disambiguation)
