= Bronikowo, Lubusz Voivodeship =

Bronikowo
- Settlement
- Location within Poland
- Coordinates: 52°15′50″N 15°49′4″E
- Country: Poland
- Voivodeship: Lubusz
- County: Świebodzin
- Gmina: Zbąszynek

Bronikowo [brɔniˈkɔvɔ] is a settlement in the administrative district of Gmina Zbąszynek, within Świebodzin County, Lubusz Voivodeship, in western Poland.
