= Boleń, Lubusz Voivodeship =

Boleń
- Settlement
- Location within Poland
- Coordinates: 52°16′19″N 15°46′6″E
- Country: Poland
- Voivodeship: Lubusz
- County: Świebodzin
- Gmina: Zbąszynek

Boleń [ˈbɔlɛɲ] is a settlement in the administrative district of Gmina Zbąszynek, within Świebodzin County, Lubusz Voivodeship, in western Poland.
