= Chlastawa =

- Village
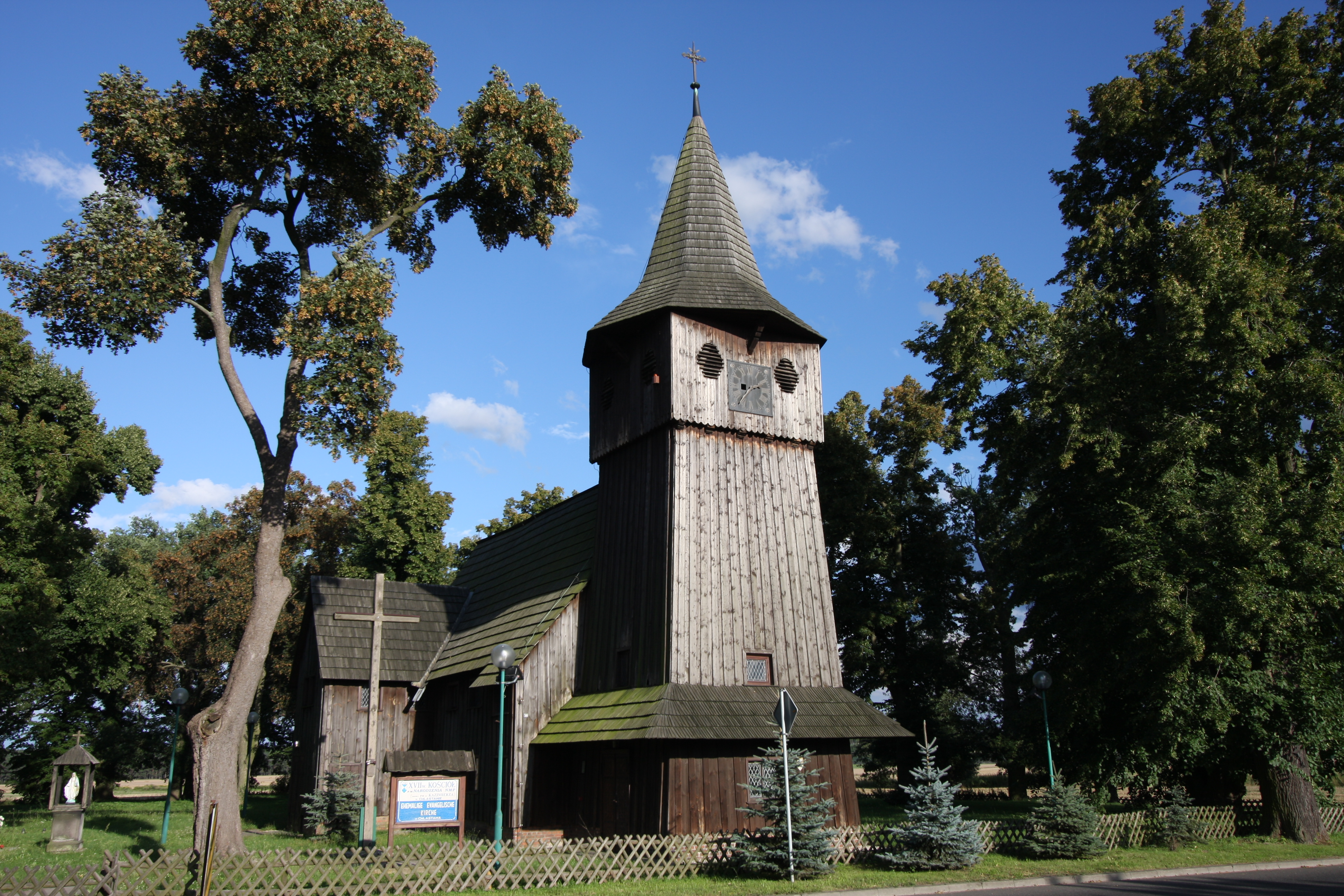
- Church of the Nativity of the Virgin Mary

- Location within Poland
- Coordinates: 52°15′N 15°50′E
- Country: Poland
- Voivodeship: Lubusz
- County: Świebodzin
- Gmina: Zbąszynek

Chlastawa [xlasˈtava] is a village in the administrative district of Gmina Zbąszynek, within Świebodzin County, Lubusz Voivodeship, in western Poland.
