= Dąbrówka Wielkopolska =

- Village
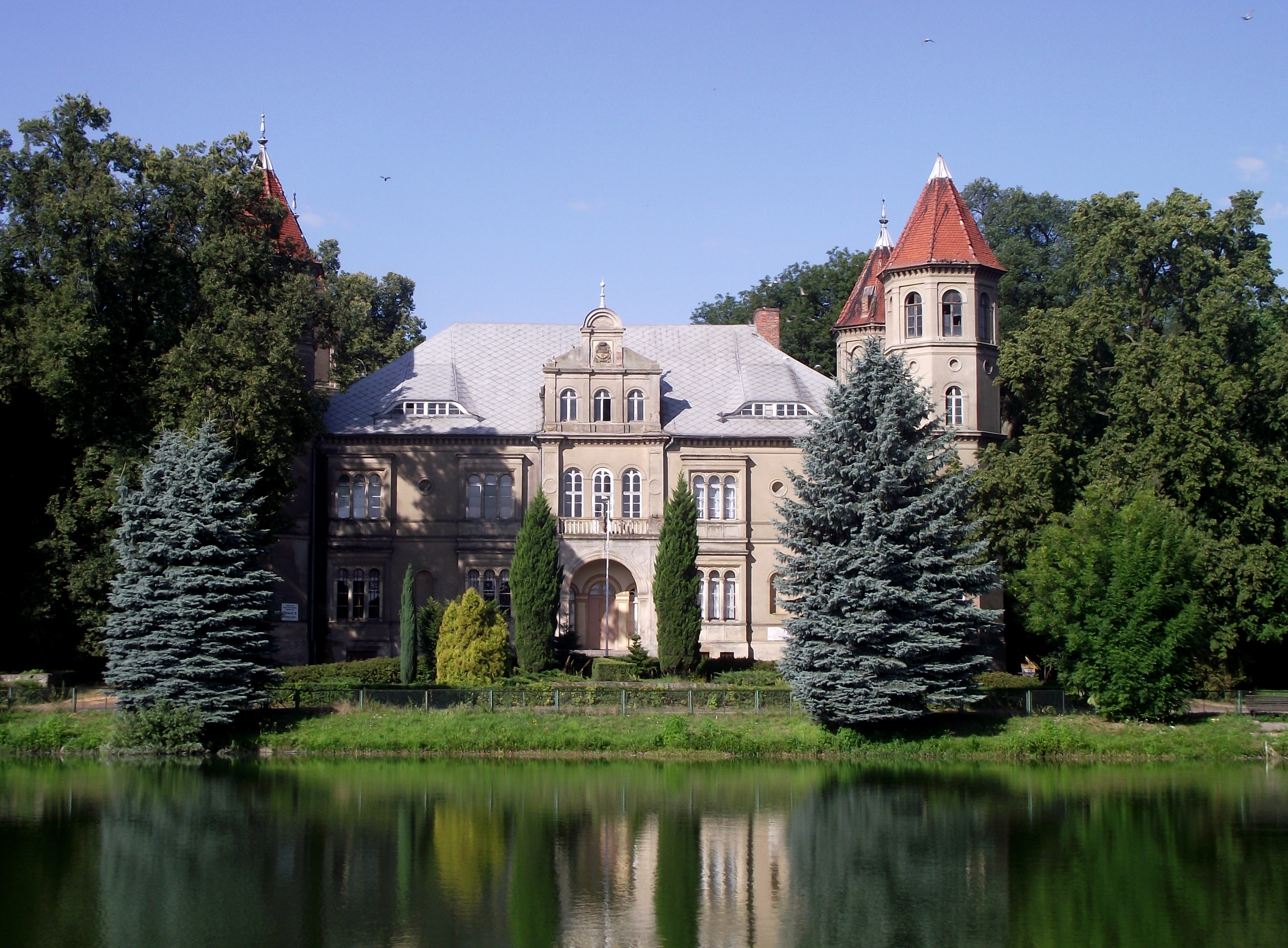
- Dąbrówka Wielkopolska Palace

- Location within Poland
- Coordinates: 52°17′N 15°49′E
- Country: Poland
- Voivodeship: Lubusz
- County: Świebodzin
- Gmina: Zbąszynek

Population
  - Total: 1,174 (2,017)
- Time zone: UTC+1 (CET)
  - Summer (DST): UTC+2 (CEST)
- Vehicle registration: FSW

Dąbrówka Wielkopolska [dɔmˈbrufka vjɛlkɔˈpɔlska] is a village in the administrative district of Gmina Zbąszynek, within Świebodzin County, Lubusz Voivodeship, in western Poland.

== History ==
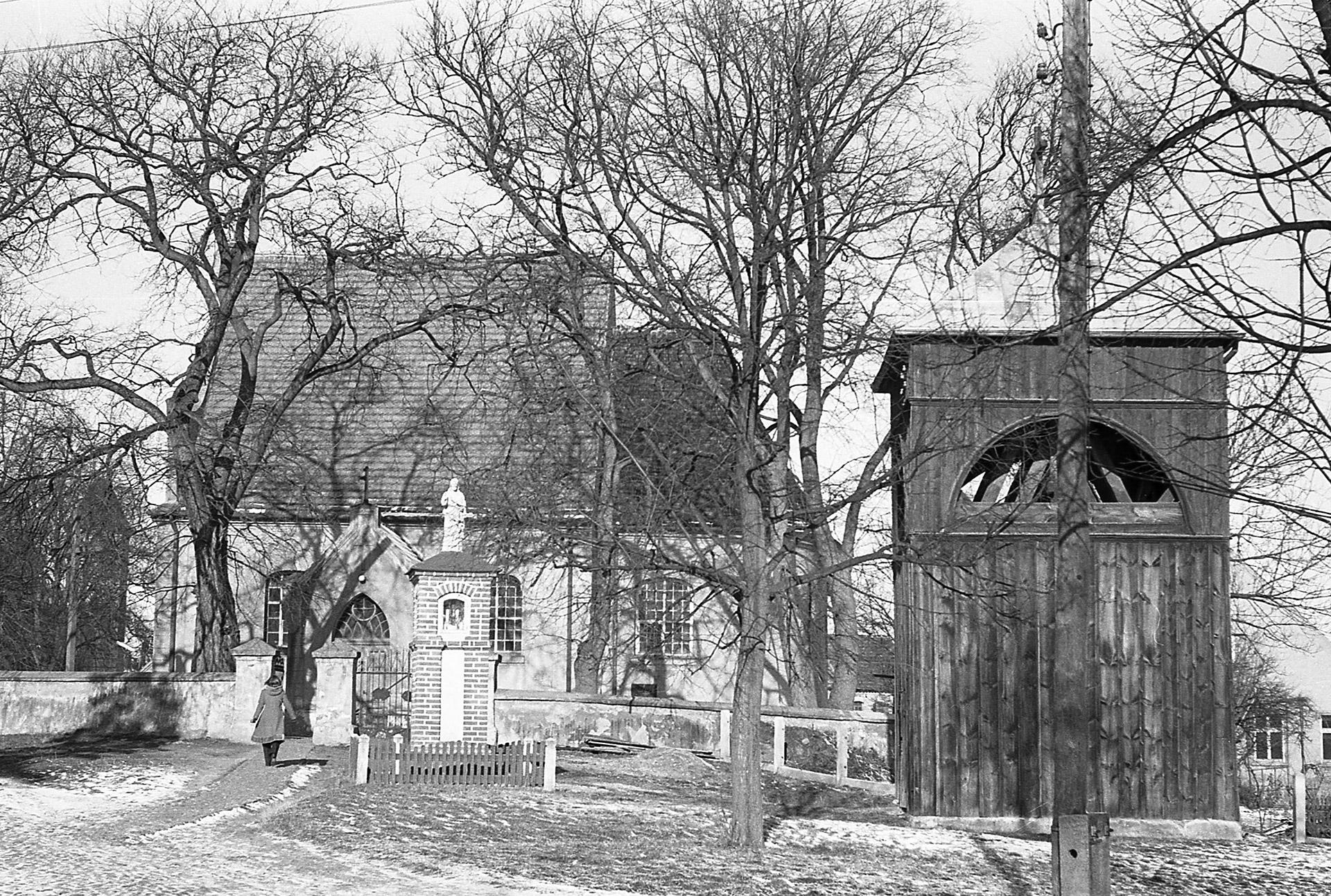
Immaculate Conception church in 1975

As part of the region of Greater Poland, i.e. the cradle of the Polish state, the area formed part of Poland since its establishment in the 10th century. Dąbrówka was a private village of Polish nobility, administratively located in the Kościan County in the Poznań Voivodeship in the Greater Poland Province.

From 1871 to 1945, the village was part of Germany. Despite being located in the heavily Germanized western borderland of the Province of Posen, it always had an ethnic Polish majority population. In 1905, 1,038 people lived in the village, of which 90.1% were Poles and 9.7% were Germans. Despite the protests of the Polish population, in 1919 it remained within Germany by the decision of the inter-Allied commission and was part of Kreis Meseritz.

In 1929–1939, there was a Polish school in the village, where 3 teachers taught and 140 children attended. There was also a Polish kindergarten established in the village in 1935 with 70 children. In 1931, the Polish Bank Ludowy was founded in the village. In 1939, out of 1,287 inhabitants of the village, 986 (76.6%) were Poles. In June 1939, the Gestapo carried out an anti-Polish operation in the village, closing down local Polish organizations, confiscating their files and funds, and expelling four leading Polish activists. On 11 September 1939, the Germans imprisoned 29 local prominent Poles, who were afterwards deported to concentration camps. Several young Poles, wanting to avoid being drafted into the Wehrmacht and fighting against Poland, fled the village. They were later caught and executed by the Germans in occupied Poland. The Germans also carried out further expulsions of Poles. With the defeat of Nazi Germany in World War II, the village became again part of Poland.

== Transport ==
There is a train station in the village.
