= Depot Island, Victoria Land =

Island of Antarctica

Depot Island
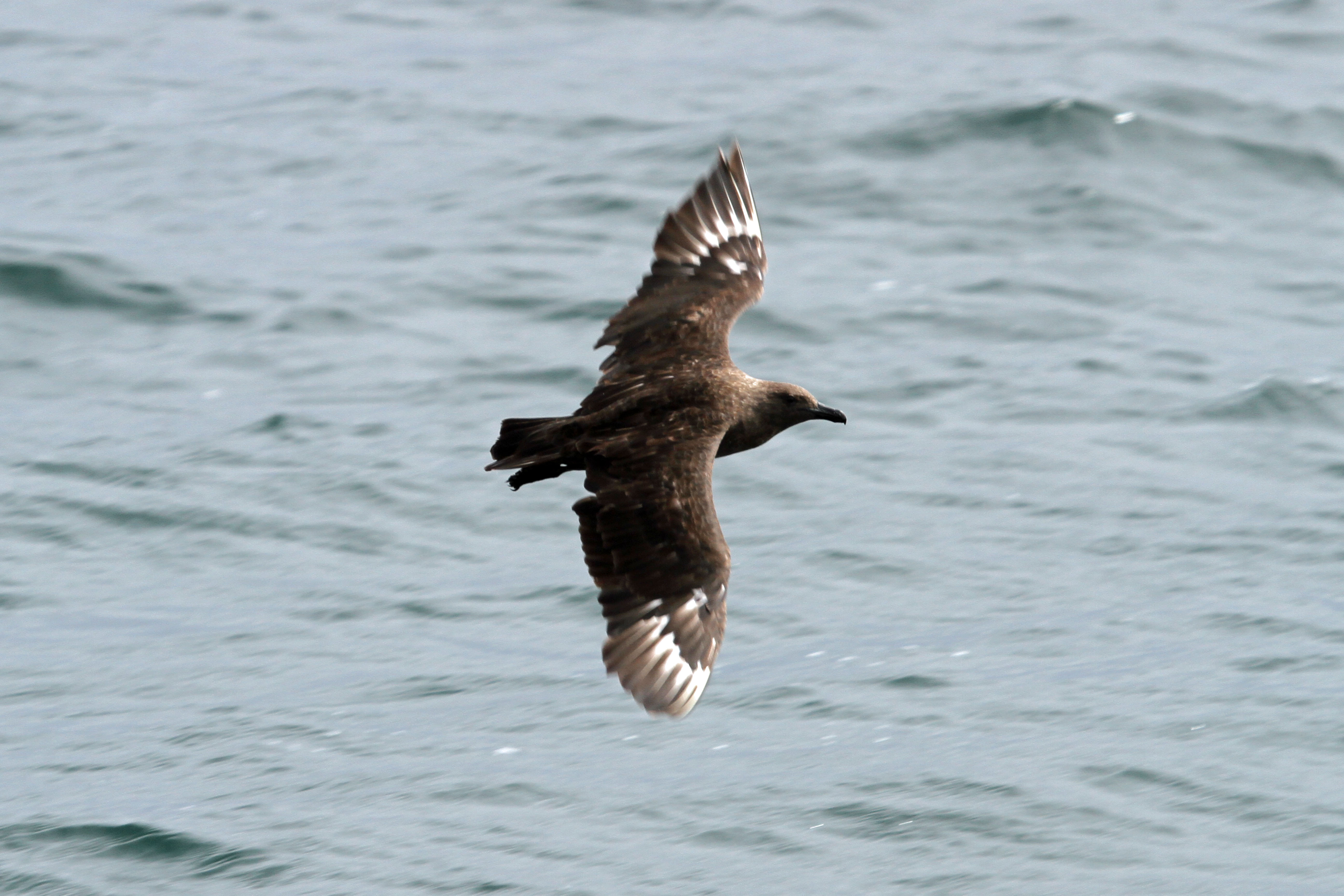
- South polar skuas breed on the island

- Location within Antarctica

Geography
- Location: Antarctica
- Coordinates: 76°42′04″S 162°58′12″E
- Area: 7 ha (17 acres)
- Length: 0.3 km (0.19 mi)
- Width: 0.3 km (0.19 mi)

Administration
- Administered under the Antarctic Treaty System

Demographics
- Population: Uninhabited

Depot Island (76°42′S 162°58′E) is a small granite island lying 2 nautical miles (3.7 km; 2.3 mi) northwest of Cape Ross, off the coast of Victoria Land, Antarctica. It was discovered by the South Magnetic Pole Party of the British Antarctic Expedition, 1907–09 and so named by them because they put a depot of rock specimens on this island.

== Location ==
Depot Island is a triangular ice-free 7 hectares (17 acres) island that os 200 metres (660 ft) off the coast of Evans Piedmont Glacier, in southern Victoria Land, Antarctica. It lies about 4 km north of Cape Ross and 10 km south-east of Tripp Island. T he whole island has been designated an Important Bird Area (IBA) by BirdLife International because it supports a small colony of south polar skuas.

== See also ==
- List of Antarctic and Subantarctic islands

== Sources ==
- Alberts, Fred G., ed. (1995), Geographic Names of the Antarctic (PDF) (2 ed.), United States Board on Geographic Names This article incorporates public domain material from websites or documents of the United States Board on Geographic Names.
