= Depot, Poland =

Depot
- Village
- Location within Poland
- Coordinates: 52°16′55″N 15°46′35″E
- Country: Poland
- Voivodeship: Lubusz
- County: Świebodzin
- Gmina: Zbąszynek
- Population: 320

Depot [ˈdɛpɔt] is a village in the administrative district of Gmina Zbąszynek, within Świebodzin County, Lubusz Voivodeship, in western Poland.
