= Depot Glacier =

Depot Glacier may refer to:

- Depot Glacier (Antarctica)
- Depot Glacier (Washington), in North Cascades National Park, Washington, USA
