= Depot Historic District =

Depot Historic District or Depot Square Historic District may refer to:

- Depot-Compress Historic District, Holly Springs, Mississippi, listed on the National Register of Historic Places (NRHP) in Marshall County, Mississippi
- Meridian Depot Historic District, listed on the NRHP in Mississippi
- Depot Historic District (Marion, North Carolina), listed on the NRHP in North Carolina
- Depot Historic District (Raleigh, North Carolina), listed on the NRHP in North Carolina
- Depot Square Historic District (Wichita Falls, Texas), listed on the NRHP in Wichita County, Texas
- Depot Square Historic District (Randolph, Vermont), listed on the NRHP in Orange County, Vermont
