= Radio Service Software =

Radio Service Software (RSS) is a software package used to program commercial Motorola two-way radios and cellular telephones. An update of RSS is CPS, a Windows-based version of the package used for some of Motorola's newer radio models. Radios are connected to PCs via the serial port, and proprietary programming cables. The use of genuine Motorola OEM programming cables is strongly suggested, as aftermarket brands are not as reliable and could lead to radio damage.

== Licensing ==
RSS (the Carrier and Super Agent forms) is available to authorized professionals from Motorola. The license does not permit resale of the software.

Unauthorized possession and use of RSS can lead to criminal charges and prosecution, as well as legal action by Motorola. In September 1999, Motorola alleged unauthorised use of this software as part of a case involving sale of non-US Motorola 2-way radios in the US. On July 17, 2000, Motorola filed a lawsuit against five individuals accused of selling copies of RSS through eBay.
