= Shaula Island =

Island in Oygarden Group, Antarctica

Shaula Island (66°58′S 57°21′E) is an island 4.8 km (3 mi) long and rising to 490 ft (150 m) lying 1.6 km (1 mi) east of Achernar Island in the Oygarden Group. Mapped by Norwegian cartographers from aerial photos taken by the Lars Christensen Expedition, 1936–37, and called "Soroya" (the south island). The group was first visited by an Australian National Antarctic Research Expeditions (ANARE) party in 1954; the island was renamed by ANARE after the star Shaula which was used for an astrofix in the vicinity.

== See also ==
- List of Antarctic and sub-Antarctic islands
