= Depot Peak =

Mountain in Antarctica

Depot Peak is a solitary nunatak featuring a single needle-shaped peak, located approximately 37 nautical miles (70 km) north of the Stinear Nunataks in Mac. Robertson Land. It was discovered by an Australian National Antarctic Research Expeditions party led by R.G. Dovers during a southern journey in December 1954, and named as such because a depot was established nearby.
