= Øygarden Group =

Islands in Cosmonauts Sea, Antarctica

- Location within Antarctica

Geography
- Location: Cosmonauts Sea
- Coordinates: 66°58′S 57°25′E

Administration
- Administered under the Antarctic Treaty System

Demographics
- Population: Uninhabited

Øygarden Group is a group of rocky, irregular islands in Antarctica which extends about 20 kilometres (11 nmi) in an east–west direction, lying in the southern part of the entrance to Edward VIII Bay. First sighted in February 1936 by Discovery Investigations personnel on the RSS William Scoresby, and considered by them to be part of the mainland. They were charted as islands by Norwegian cartographers from aerial photographs taken by the Lars Christensen Expedition in January–February 1937, and named Øygarden, a descriptive term for a protective chain of islands lying along and off the coast.
