= Max Samuel Grifenhagen =

1900s American public figure

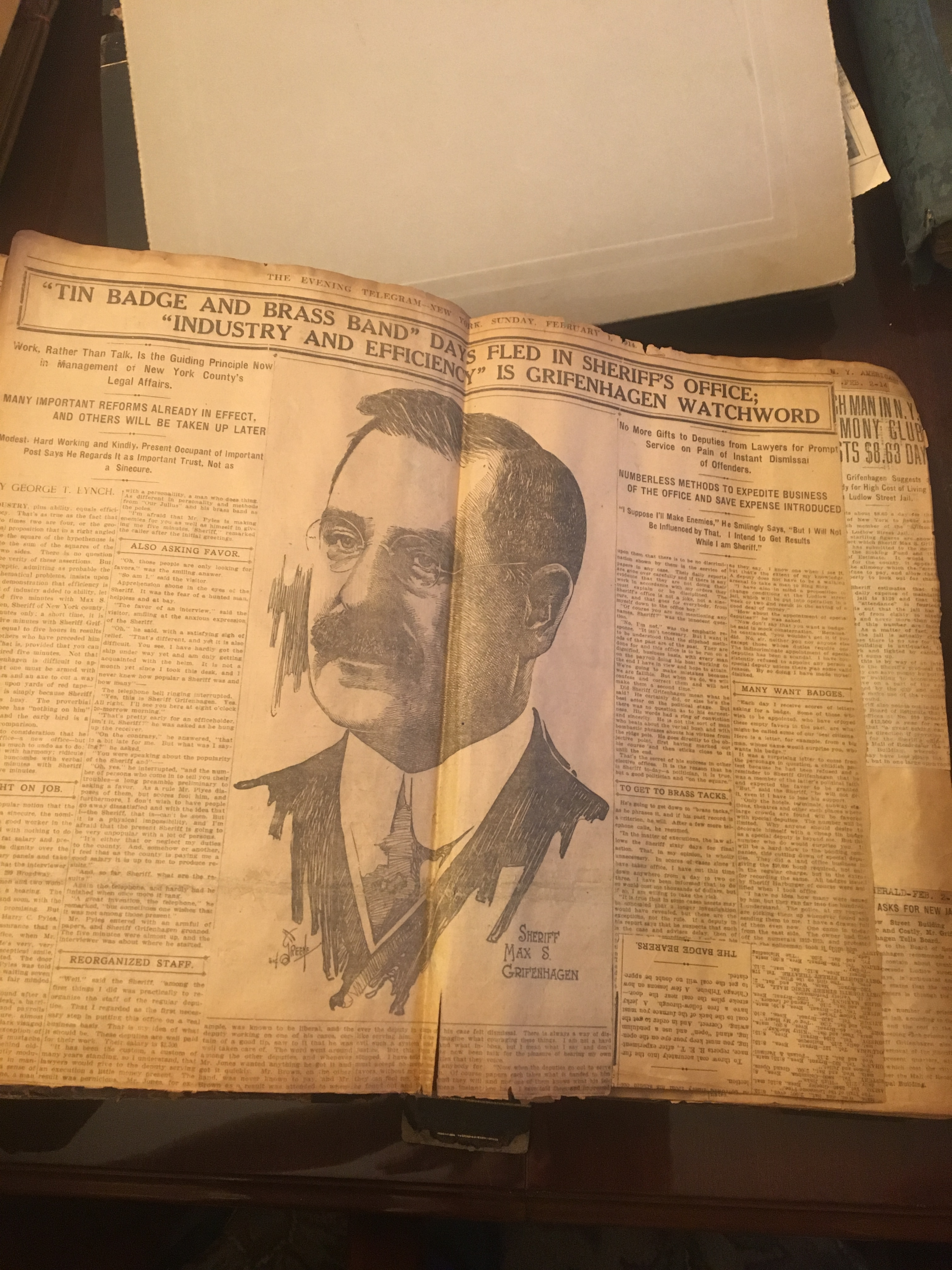
- Newspaper from February 1, 1914, concerning Grifenhagen
- Born: May 12, 1861; Chicago, Illinois
- Died: October 28, 1932 (aged 71)

Max Samuel Grifenhagen (May 12, 1861 – October 28, 1932) was an American entrepreneur, businessman, manufacturer, and notable Republican politician in New York City in the early 1900s. He was the noted sheriff of New York County (present day Manhattan), an alderman, and a city registrar.

== Biography ==
=== Early life ===
Max was born to a Jewish family in Chicago, Cook County, Illinois, where he attended the public schools there. His father died in 1866, when Max was only five years old. The Great Chicago Fire of 1871 caused Max's family to lose all of their income, and two years later they moved to New York City and lived in the 7th Ward on the East-side. Max attended public schools on Monroe and Henry Streets. After school, Max had to work as an errand boy and a newsboy to help support his family financially.

After leaving school and while still in his teens, he went to Denver, where he engaged in cattle dealing. After remaining there for six years, he returned to New York City and married.

He then began his entrepreneurship on a grand scale, beginning "his business career as a poor boy and [making] a fortune in the manufacture and sale of bottles, cider, vinegar, and sacramental wines, among various other business ventures and real estate dealings."

== Business ventures ==
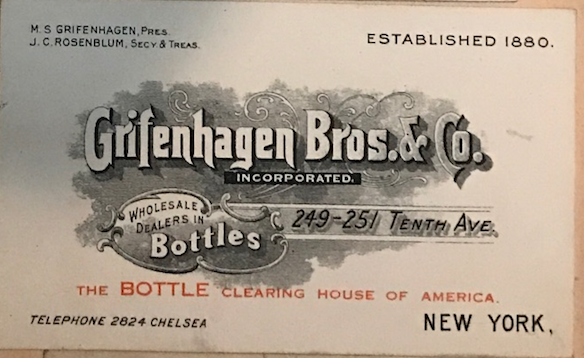
Grifenhagen Bros. & Co., Inc. business card #2

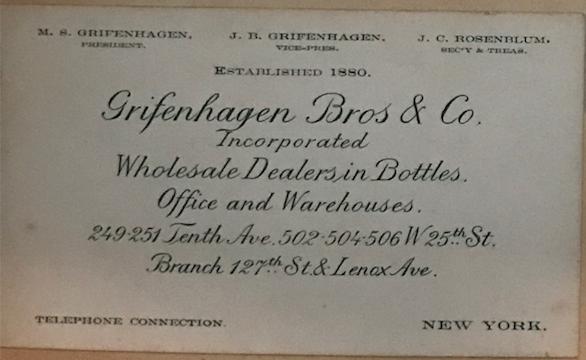
Grifenhagen Bros & Co. Inc. business card

=== Grifenhagen Bros and Co. ===
In 1880, Max and his brother Jacob B. Grifenhagen founded Grifenhagen Brothers & Company, Incorporated (more commonly called Grifenhagen Bros & Co.). They were wholesale dealers in new and old bottles. The firm went on to manufacture bottles, and was the biggest bottle manufacturer in America in the late 1800s. The corporate offices were shared with Max's other business offices at 249–251 Tenth Avenue. They were known as "The Bottle Clearing House of America", becoming one of the largest of its kind in the country.

=== Mohican Springs Co. ===
Max served as the Vice President and Director of the Mohican Springs Co. after purchasing the property and other assets of the Mohican Springs Water Co. of New Jersey. His brother Jacob B. Grifenhagen served as President.

=== Duffy-Mott Company, Inc. ===
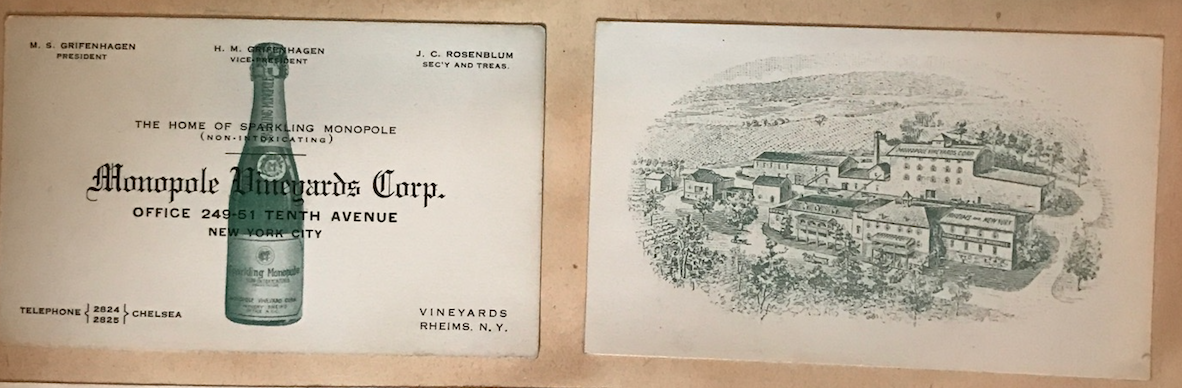
Monopole Vineyards Corp. business card and photo

In 1912, Max founded the Duffy-Mott Company, Inc., cider and vinegar manufacturers and wholesale dealers. The Duffy-Mott Company would go on to become the household applesauce company commonly known as Mott's. Max was President of the Duffy-Mott Company until his death.

=== Monopole Vineyards Corporation ===
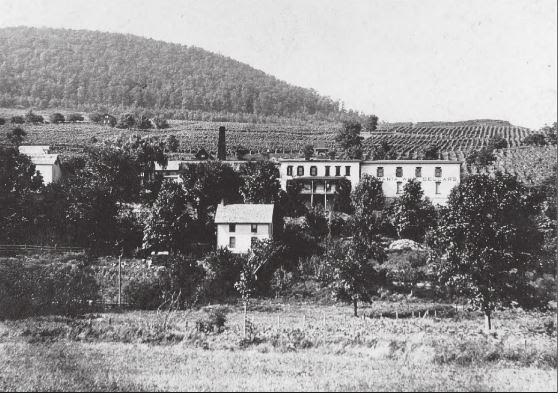
Monopole Vineyards Corp.

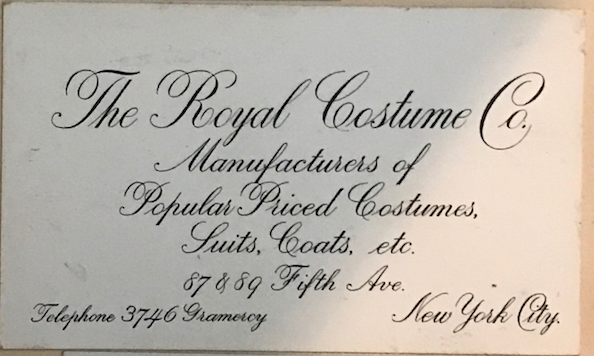
The Royal Costume Co. business card

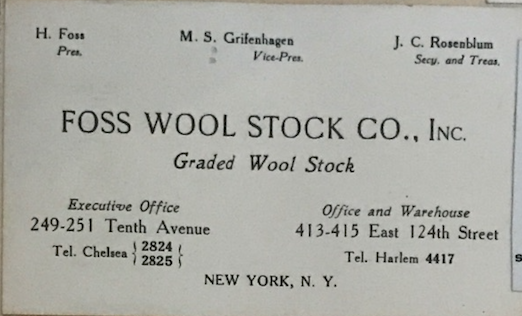
Foss Wool Stock Co. business card

In 1914, Max founded the Monopole Vineyards Corporation, with a large winery at Rheims, NY. After retiring as the Sheriff of New York County, Max purchased the Germania Wine Cellars in Steuben County in September 1919. Before prohibition, it manufactured and sold champagne and other fine wines. Following prohibition, manufacturing was limited to sacramental wines and non-alcoholic beverages. Max's son Herbert M. Grifenhagen served as Vice President while his brother-in-law Jacob C. Rosenblum served as Secretary and Treasurer. Max served as President of the corporation until his death. The corporate offices were shared with Max's other business offices at 249–251 Tenth Avenue.

=== The Royal Costume Co. ===
Max was the founder and President of The Royal Costume Company, manufacturers of popular priced costumes, suits, coats, etc. The business was located at 87 & 89 Fifth Ave., New York City.

=== Foss Wool Stock Co., Inc. ===
Max also served as the Vice President of Foss Wool Stock Company, Inc., which was in the business of producing/manufacturing "Graded Wool Stock". H. Foss served as President of the company and Jacob C. Rosenblum served as Secretary & Treasurer.

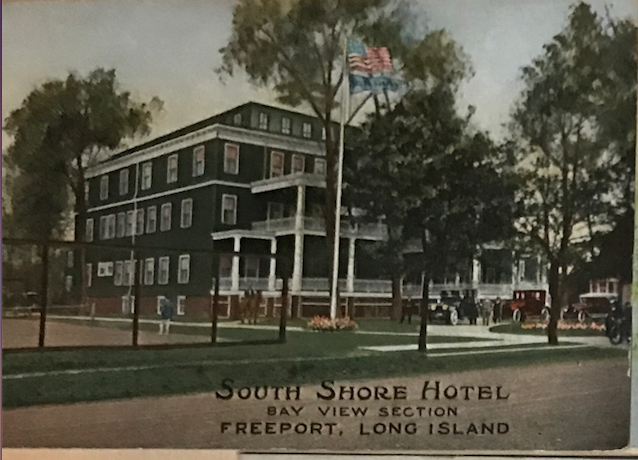
South Shore Hotel, one of Max's many hotels

=== Real estate ===
Max was heavily involved and extremely successful in the real estate business throughout New York. He bought, sold, owned and operated numerous hotels throughout New York City and the state of New York over the course of his life. One of the many notable commercial properties owned by Max was the Grove Hotel, located at 98 Rose Street, which he purchased for $60,000 in 1916. This is the building that the Duffey's (Duffey-Mott) lived in for many years.

== Political life ==
=== Alderman ===
In 1904, representing the Washington Heights district, Max became a Republican Alderman, serving for five years.

In 1907, he became chairman of the Committee on Buildings of the Board of Alderman.

==== Building Code revisions ====
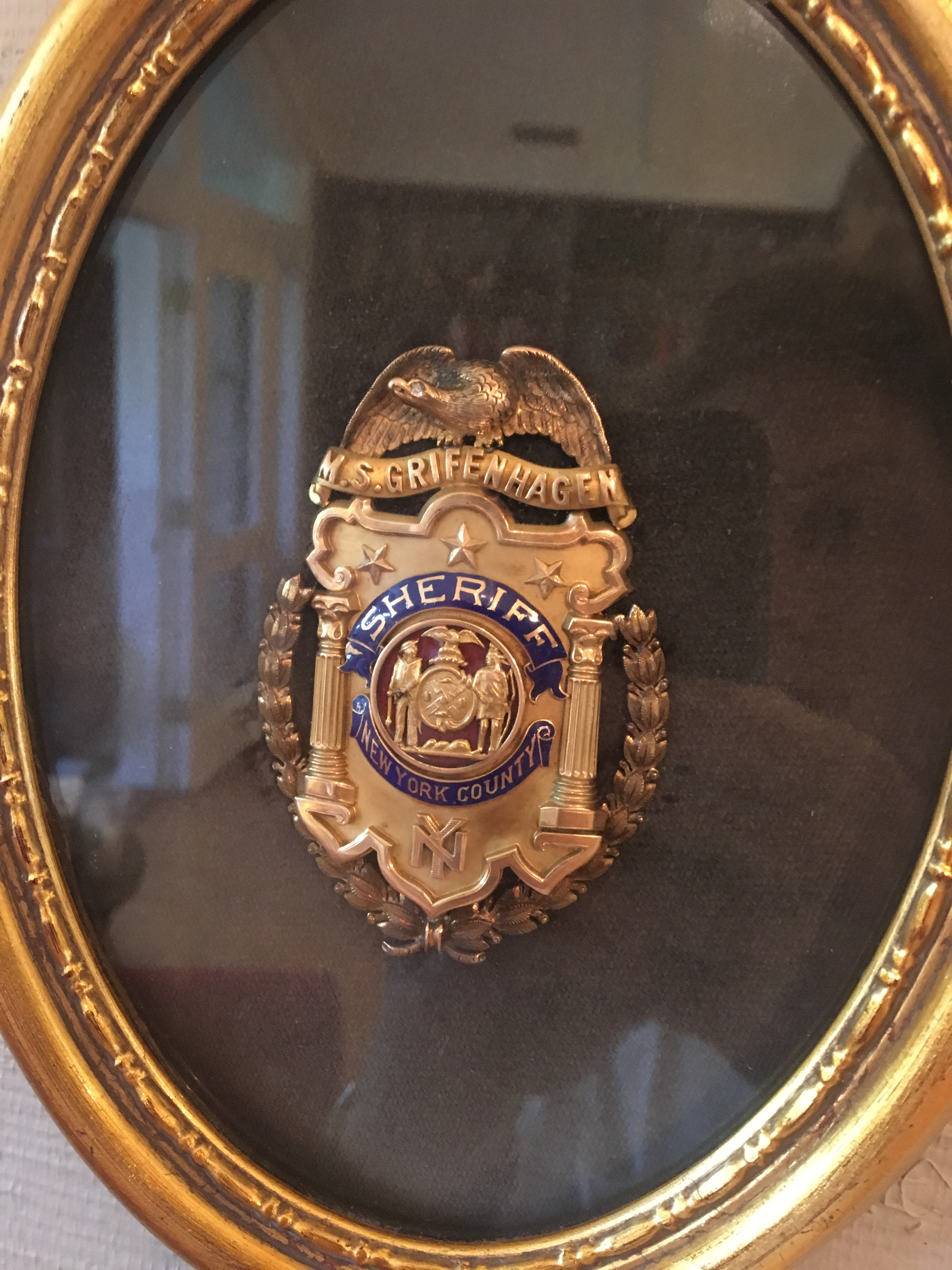
Sheriff's Badge of Max Samuel Grifenhagen

Max's efforts to have the Building Code revised were highly praised. Max believed that "a small auxiliary committee of experts can be more effective than the larger one which it is possible to employ under the terms of the resolution of the Board."

In revising the code, Max believed that it "should be based upon thoroughly scientific grounds, taking advantage of the latest developments in municipal architecture, in sanitation and in civil engineering".

In addition to taking advantage of the latest innovation and technology, Max's revisions to the Code also encouraged and ensured the creation of a more beautiful New York City; "It should not be forgotten that, at the same time, the artistic considerations should be always kept in view. Changes can be made in the Building Code which if properly considered would go far to improve the artistic character of New York City. We have many restrictions in our Code for the purely material side of affairs, but few which are based upon the principles of beauty. In every great foreign metropolis such restrictions are reçognized and made part of the Code—in some instances even being given first consideration."

=== New York County Register ===
In 1909, running on the Republican-Fusion Ticket, Max was elected New York County Register. He made many changes in the property registration methods of the office.

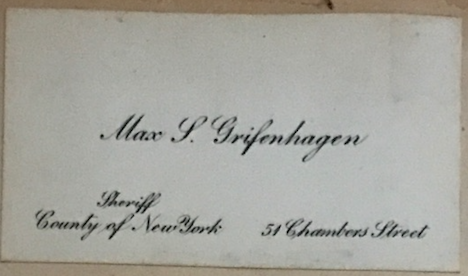
Old business card of Sheriff Max Grifenhagen

=== New York County Sheriff ===
In 1913, again running as a Republican-Fusion candidate, he was elected Sheriff. During his term, Harry Thaw and police lieutenant Charles Becker were among his prisoners. Thaw was the murderer of the renowned architect Stanford White. Becker was the first American police officer to ever receive the death penalty. The scandal that surrounded his arrest, conviction, and execution was one of the most important in Progressive Era New York City.

==== Changes in Fee System under Sheriff Max S. Grifenhagen ====
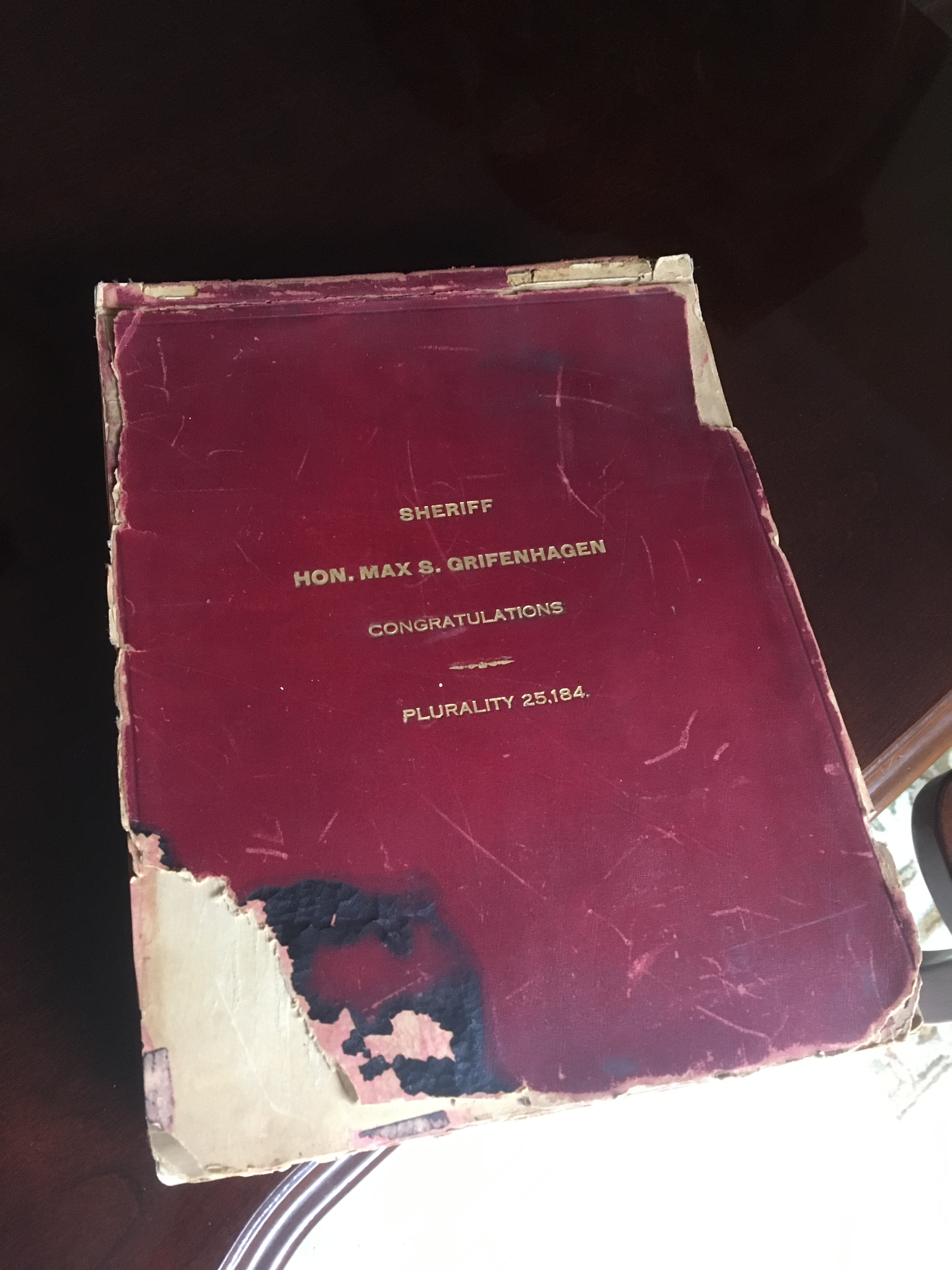
Collection of hundreds of congratulation letters sent to Max when he was elected Sheriff

While serving as Sheriff, Max urged that a law be passed providing for payment of Sheriff's fees into the public treasury instead of to the Sheriff. He held that the Sheriff's remuneration was excessive. He was the first Sheriff of New York County to reveal what the fees and salary amounted to, saying that he received US$113,000 for his first two years in office (equivalent to $3,600,000 in 2025).

In May 1916, a few months after Max retired from office, Governor Whitman signed a bill abolishing payment of fees to Sheriffs, to take effect after the term of Alfred E. Smith, Max's successor. Max was key in bringing an end to the corruptible practice of paying fees directly to the Sheriff.

=== Political agenda and charity ===
Because of his poverty-stricken childhood, Max was always passionate about helping the poor. This was apparent throughout his political life; he pushed to establish medical clinics, parks, and playgrounds on the East Side of New York City. He was also a liberal contributor to charity.

Max was very active in the affairs of the Hebrew Orphan Asylum and gave considerable sums toward its upkeep. Max was a trustee for the last twenty five years of his life and was the third oldest member of the board at his death. He was also the second oldest member of the congregation of Temple Israel of the City of New York.

In 1918, Max was urged to run for Congress, but declined. He took an active interest in Republican affairs until his death, however, often making campaign speeches. He belonged to the National Republican Club and the Riverside Republican Club, and was a founder of the New York County Republican Club.

== Retirement and late life ==
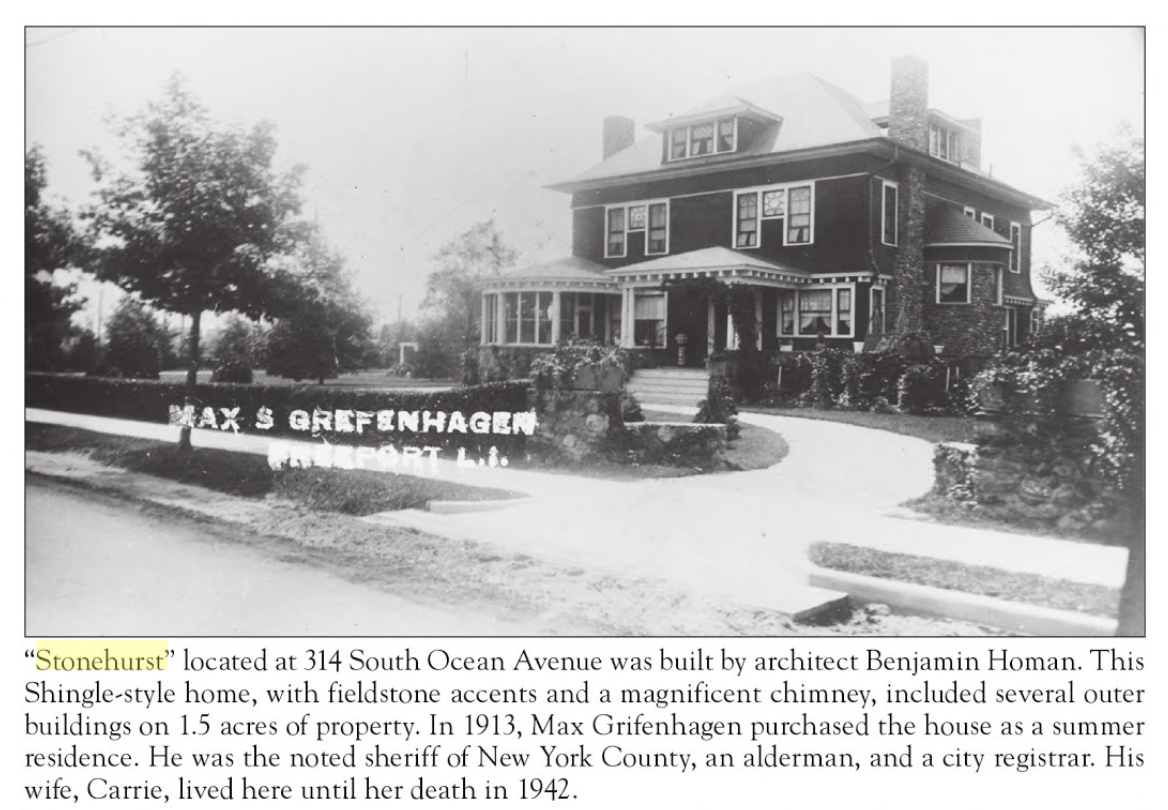

=== Stonehurst ===
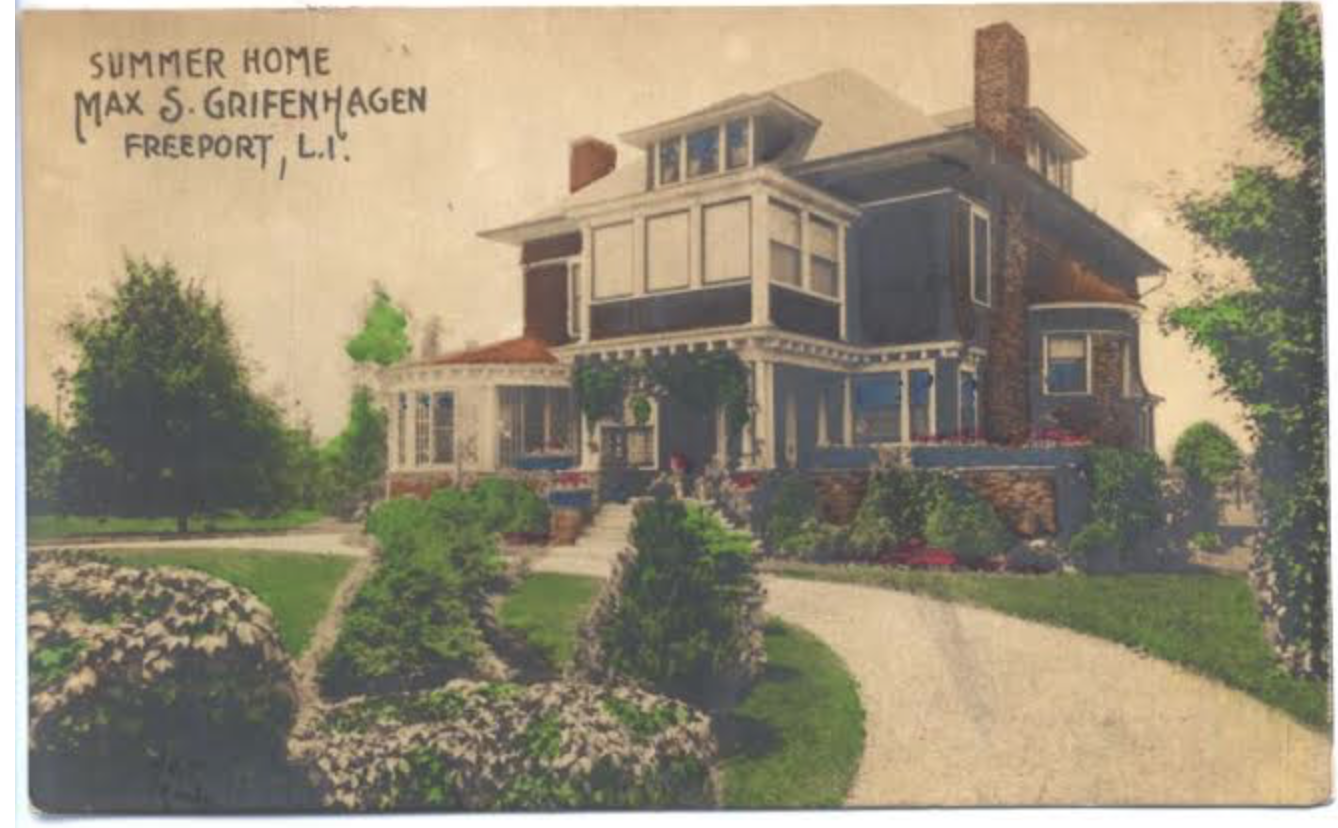
Stonehurst, Max's summer home, Freeport, Long Island

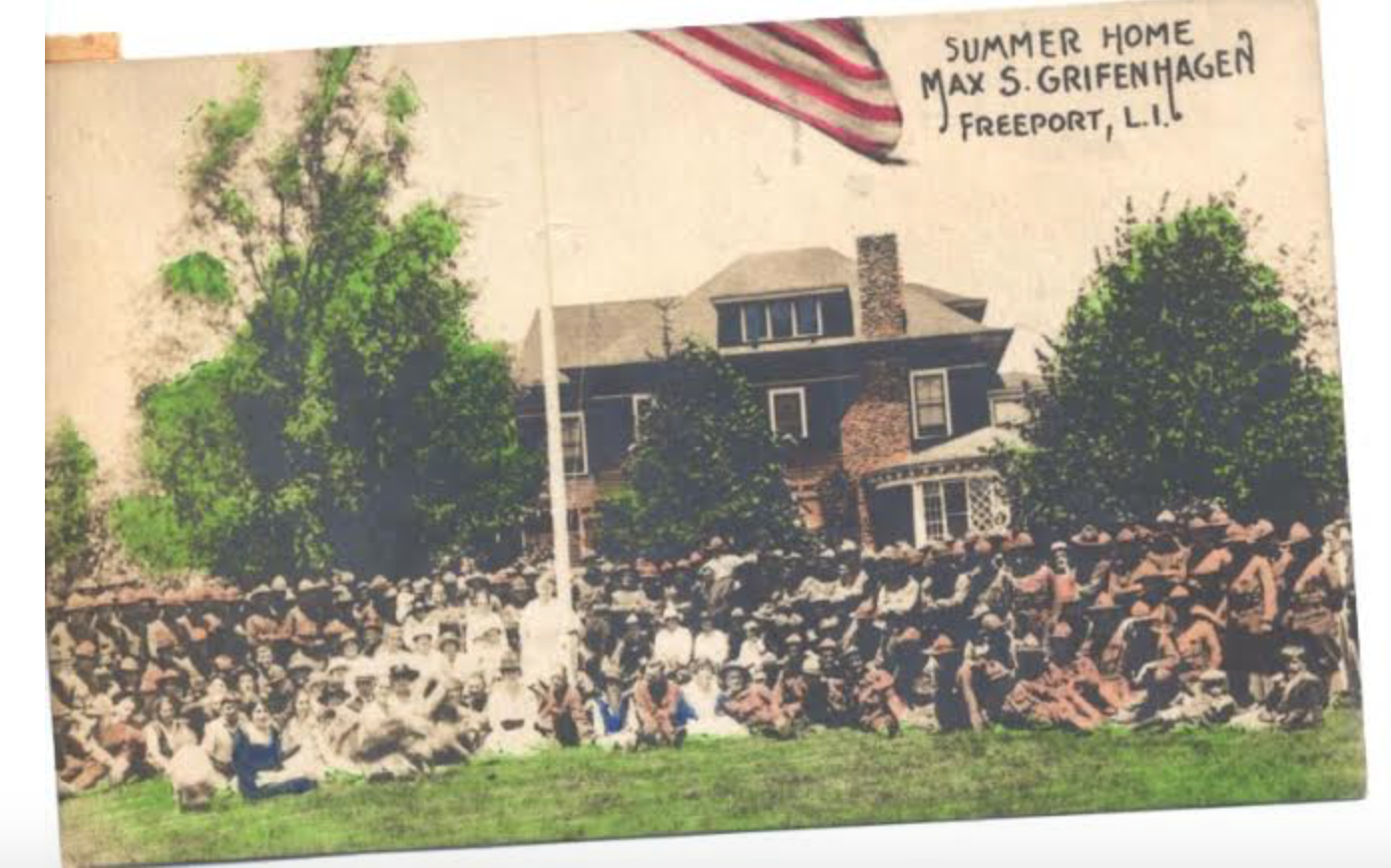
Stonehurst, Max's summer home, Freeport, Long Island

In 1913, Max Grifenhagen purchased "Stonehurst", a house in Freeport, as a summer residence. Stonehurst is the name of the house located at 314 South Ocean Avenue. Built by Benjamin Homan around 1901, this shingle-style home includes field stone accents, a magnificent chimney, and several outer buildings. The original property included 1.5 acres. His wife Carrie lived there until her death until 1942.

The house later became a 13-bedroom rooming house. In 1977, the Village of Freeport tried to ban rooming houses by the year 1987. In 1981, the owner of 314 South Ocean Avenue, Richard M. Jones, filed suit against the ban. This house remained a rooming house until 2014.

== Family Origins ==
=== Family ===
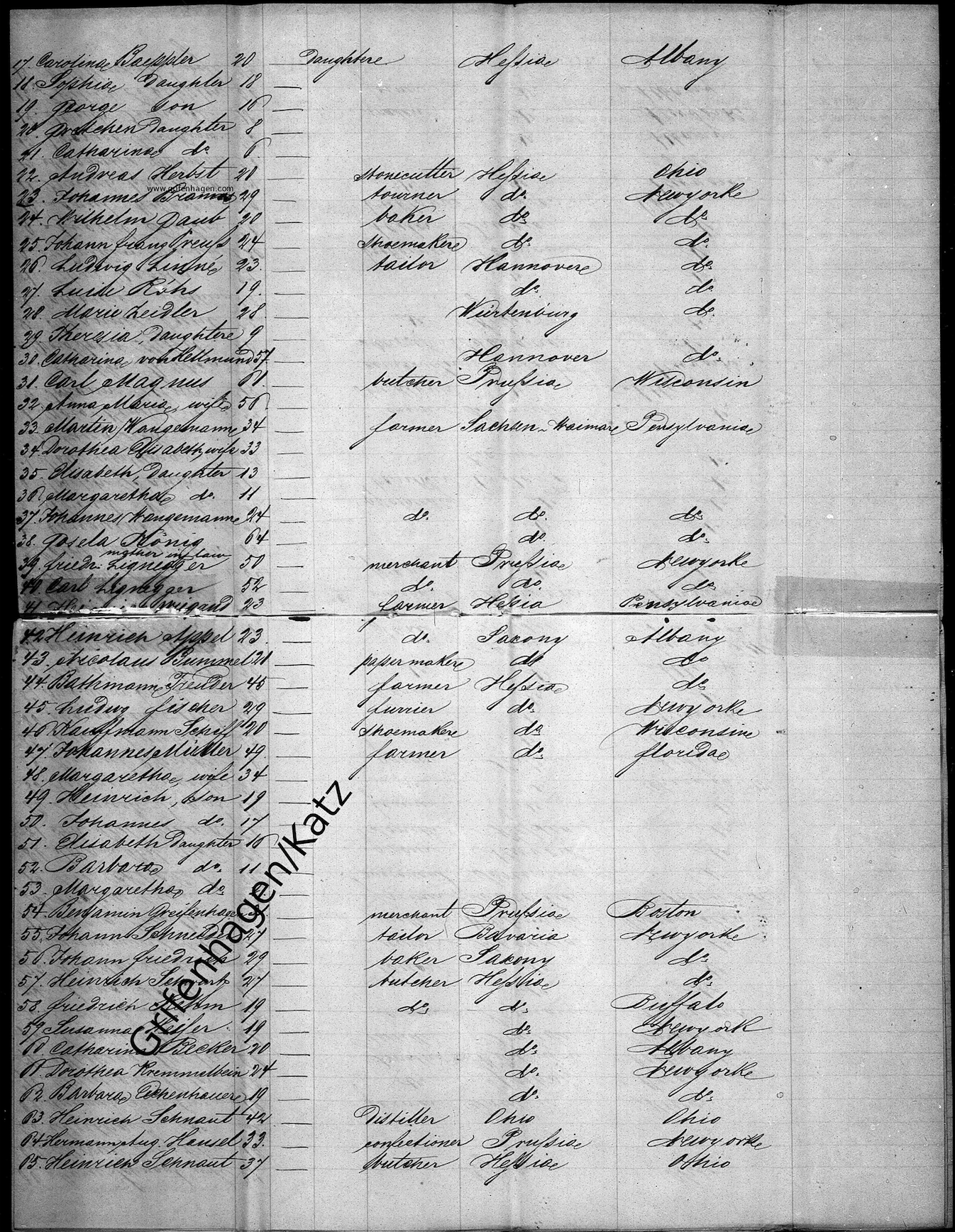
Passenger list showing the immigration of Max's father into the United States

Max was born on May 12, 1861, in Chicago, Cook County, Illinois to Benjamin William Grifenhagen (January 3, 1820; Wollstein – November 4, 1866; Chicago, IL) and Esther Voss Grifenhagen (December 24, 1819 Wollstein – August 18, 1909; New York, NY).

His parents, Benjamin and Esther, immigrated from the former German town of Wollstein in the Posen Province, Prussia, Germany, (now Wolsztyn, Poland) to the United States in the mid 1850s with Max's older brother, Jacob B. Grifenhagen (January 7, 1852; Wollstein – March 6, 1914; New York, NY).

- Max's parents then had a daughter, Bertha Grifenhagen (April 22, 1857 – May 13, 1923), in Boston, Massachusetts. They eventually settled in Chicago, Illinois, where they would give birth to Max Samuel Grifenhagen and his two younger siblings, Edward Grifenhagen (November 25, 1863 – November 25, 1914; New York, NY) and Florence Grifenhagen Rosenblum (July 2, 1866 – May 18, 1937; New York, NY).
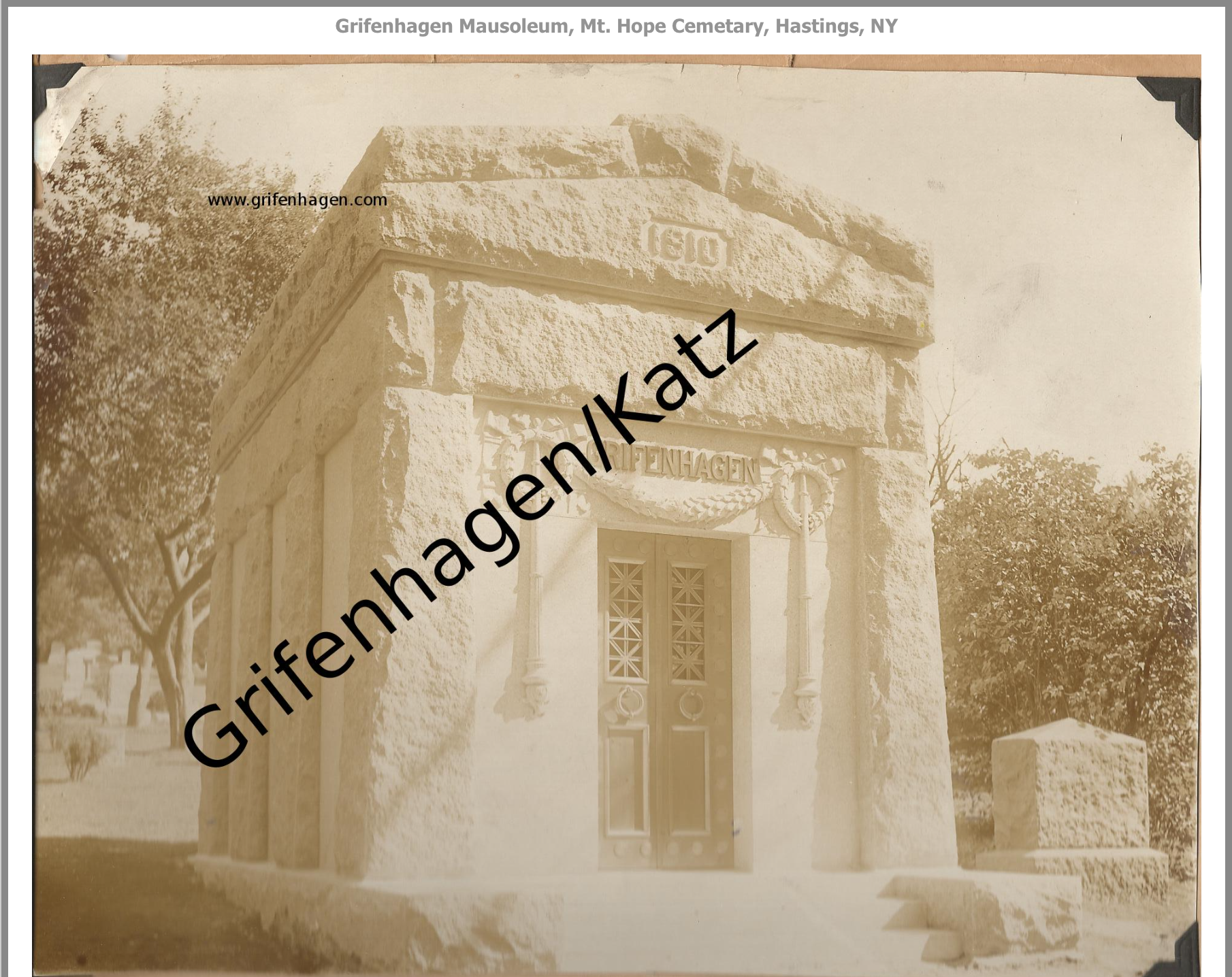
  Grifenhagen Mausoleum in Mt. Hope Cemetery, Hastings NY

=== Wife and children ===
Max married Carrie Bell Cole Grifenhagen (September 26, 1867; Sandwich, Illinois – February 9, 1942; New York, NY) on November 26, 1882, in Denver, Colorado. They had seven children together and adopted the child of their daughter Edith after her husband abandoned her. Their children were:

- Ruth B. Grifenhagen Monroe (May 25, 1885; New York, NY – February 17, 1967)
- Benjamin William Grifenhagen (September 24, 1886; New York, NY – July 12, 1938; Freeport, Long Island, NY)
- Madeline Grifenhagen Fried (November 23, 1888; New York, NY – April 8, 1964; New York, NY)
- Mendel Grifenhagen (January 28, 1891 – unknown)
- Edith Grifenhagen Freedman (June 23, 1892 – unknown)
- Herbert M. Grifenhagen (April 23, 1896; New York, NY – July 5, 1966; Saddle River, NJ)
- Wilbur Grifenhagen (June 3, 1900; New York, NY – November 18, 1963)
- Arline Zeitz Grifenhagen (June 4, 1913 – unknown) [daughter of Edith Grifenhagen, adopted by Max and Carrie after Edith's husband left her]

==== Max's Grandfather – Rabbi Mendel Menachem Grifenhagen (father of Benjamin William Grifenhagen) ====
The following are excerpts from a November 1913 article found in "The Wahrheit", a New York Yiddush Newspaper that was active from 1905 until 1919.

The headline states "The Apple Doesn't Fall Far From the Tree", implying that Max was continuing the righteous, selfless, outgoing and involved life that his grandfather Rabbi Mendel Menachem Grifenhagen maintained in the German town of Wollstein in the Posen Province, Prussia, Germany, now Wolsztyn, Poland.

Max's grandfather, Rabbi Mendel Menachem, was the administrator of the local and renowned Talmud Academy. He was described in this article as being "famous...one of the great Rabbis of Germany from Poznań." He was a Rabbi for over 60 years and lived well past 90 years of age. The paper stated that "Max possesses all the traits of being a relative of such a great man."

The article also describes Max's father, Benjamin, as being "a great student in the works of God and in Judaic studies." It described his mother as a "fine woman from one of the Heildesheimer and/or Mischpocha families (we are unsure if this was the name of her community or a family name).
