= Hans Jürgen Kallmann =

German painter

Hans Jürgen Kallmann (20 May 1908 – 6 March 1991) was a German artist.

He was born in Wollstein, Posen. Kallmann was the son of a dermatologist. He was raised in Halle (Saale) and spent his early years as an artist from 1930 to 1944 in Berlin. In 1937 he was declared a degenerate artist by the Nazis and forbidden to exhibit. Some of his works were confiscated and burned on 20 March 1939 by the Berlin Fire Brigade.

In 1949 he received a professorship at the Art Academy in Caracas, Venezuela, where he taught figure and portrait painting.

Kallmann returned in 1952 to Germany and lived and worked as a freelance artist in Pullach in the district of Munich until his death in 1991. From the mid-1950s he became known for his portraits of renowned personalities of culture, science and politics, such as Otto Hahn, Theodor Heuss, Pope John XXIII, Mao Zedong, Bertolt Brecht, and Walther Meissner. Kallmann's preferred painting techniques were oil painting and an unusual mixed technique of pastel and tempera painting whose recipe he always kept secret. As a draftsman Kallmann favored pastels, charcoal, and from the 1950s a special lightfast felt pen. His style was influenced by the German Impressionists Max Slevogt and Max Liebermann and by the Expressionists. The observation of nature and the transformation of what is seen into a new pictorial reality were the prerequisite for artistic creation for him.

In 1992 a museum dedicated to his work, the Kallmann Museum, opened in Ismaning near Munich.
