= Stanisław Piosik =

Polish politician

member of Sejm 2005-2007
- In office 19 October 2001 – 4 November 2007

Personal details
- Born: 1946 (age 79–80)
- Party: Democratic Left Alliance

Stanisław Piosik (born 25 February 1946 in Wolsztyn) is a Polish politician. He was elected to the Sejm on 25 September 2005, getting 5,105 votes in 38 Piła district as a candidate from the Democratic Left Alliance list.

He was also a member of Sejm 2001-2005.

== See also ==
- Members of Polish Sejm 2005-2007
