= Wolsztyn =

Town in Greater Poland Voivodeship, Poland

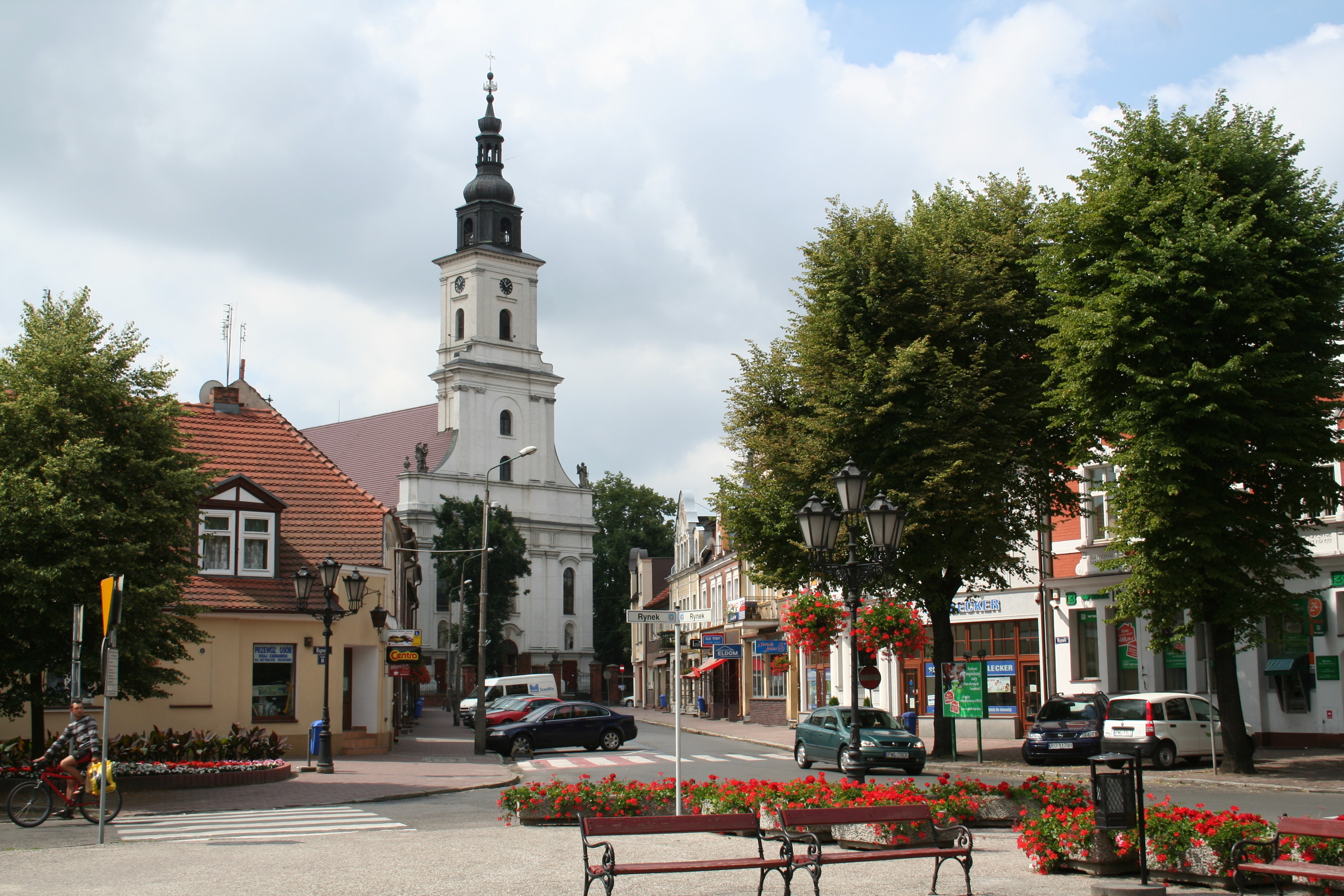
- Baroque church of the Immaculate Conception

- Flag Coat of arms

- Location within Poland
- Coordinates: 52°7′N 16°7′E
- Country: Poland
- Voivodeship: Greater Poland
- County: Wolsztyn
- Gmina: Wolsztyn
- Established: ca. 1285
- Town rights: before 1424

Area
  - Total: 4.78 km^{2} (1.85 sq mi)

Population (2006)
  - Total: 13,557
  - Density: 2,840/km^{2} (7,350/sq mi)
- Time zone: UTC+1 (CET)
  - Summer (DST): UTC+2 (CEST)
- Postal code: 64-200, 64-201
- Vehicle registration: PWL
- Website: www.wolsztyn.pl

Wolsztyn [ˈvɔlʂtɨn] (German: Wollstein) is a town in western Poland, on the western edge of Greater Poland Voivodeship. It is the seat of Wolsztyn County, and of Gmina Wolsztyn.

Founded in the Middle Ages, Wolsztyn is a former residential town of the Polish noble families of Gajewski and Mycielski. It became more internationally known for being the site of German-operated prisoner-of-war camps for Allied soldiers of various nationalities during the German occupation of Poland in World War II. The town contains several landmarks, including a palace and park ensemble, and hosts the annual Steam Locomotives Parade.

== Geography ==
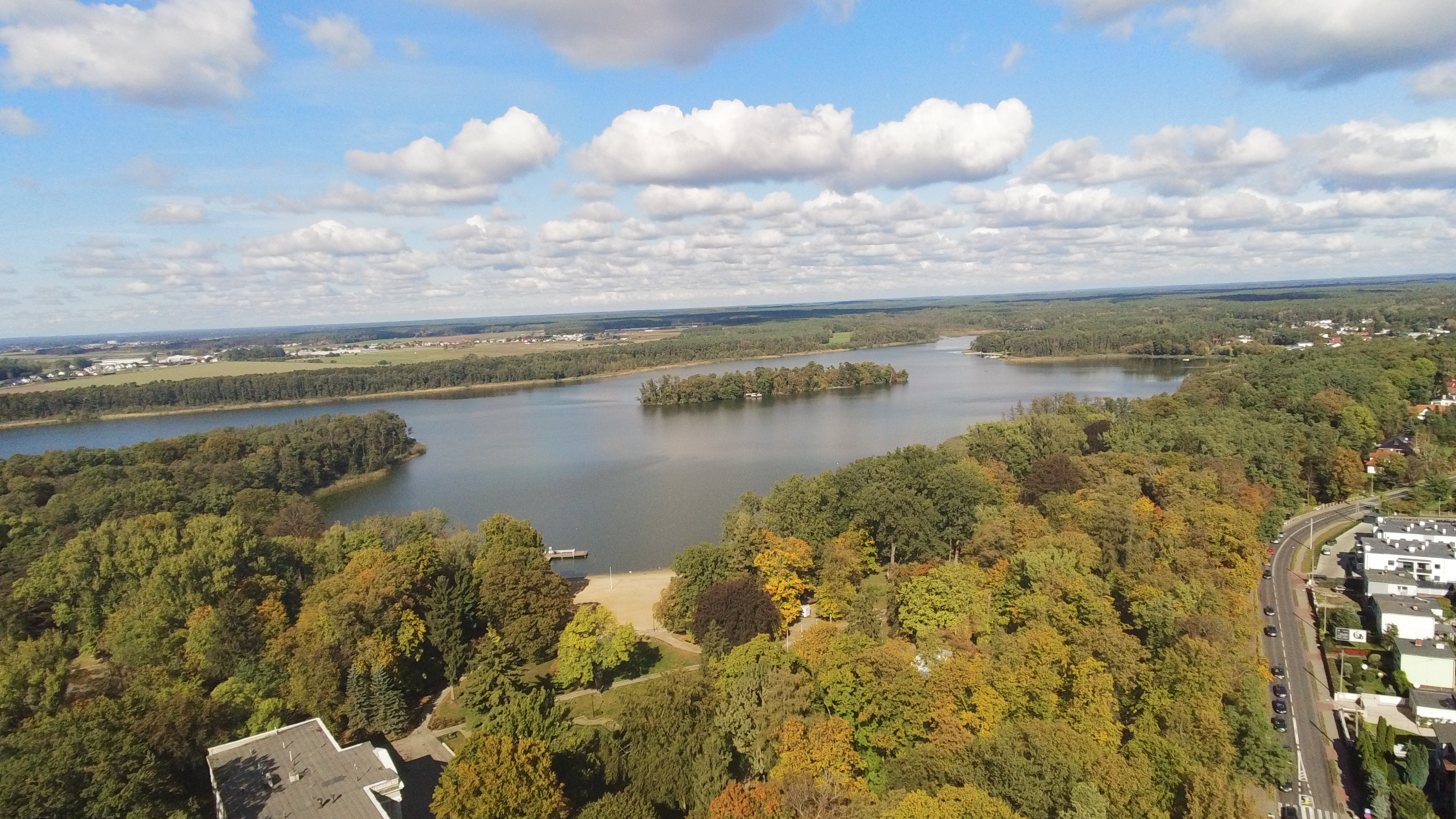
Wolsztyn Lake

The town is situated within the historic Greater Poland region, located on the small Dojca river, a headstream of the Obra.

The municipal area includes a large lake (Jezioro Wolsztyńskie; Wolsztyn Lake), next to which is a palace built in Classical style in the early 20th century, now used as a hotel and restaurant, and a park. Nearby tourist destinations include the Pszczew Landscape Park and the Przemęt Landscape Park.

== History ==
The current settlement was established about 1285 on a causeway across the swampy Dojca River, probably by Cistercian monks descending from Obra Abbey. It developed as a centre of wool trade and cloth manufacturing on the road from Poznań to Lusatia, vested with market rights in 1424. Wolsztyn's town privileges were confirmed in 1519. It was a private town of Polish nobility, administratively located in the Kościan County in the Poznań Voivodeship in the Greater Poland Province of the Kingdom of Poland. A route connecting Warsaw and Poznań with Dresden ran through the town in the 18th century and King Augustus III of Poland often traveled that route.

It was annexed by Prussia in the course of the Second Partition of Poland in 1793. After the successful Greater Poland uprising of 1806, it was regained by Poles and included within the short-lived Polish Duchy of Warsaw, and after its dissolution in 1815 it was reannexed by Prussia, as part of the Grand Duchy of Posen. Wolsztyn, then called Wollstein, was the district capital of Kreis Bomst. With the Prussian Province of Posen it became part of the German Empire in 1871 and a target of the Germanisation policies carried out by the German Eastern Marches Society (Hakata).

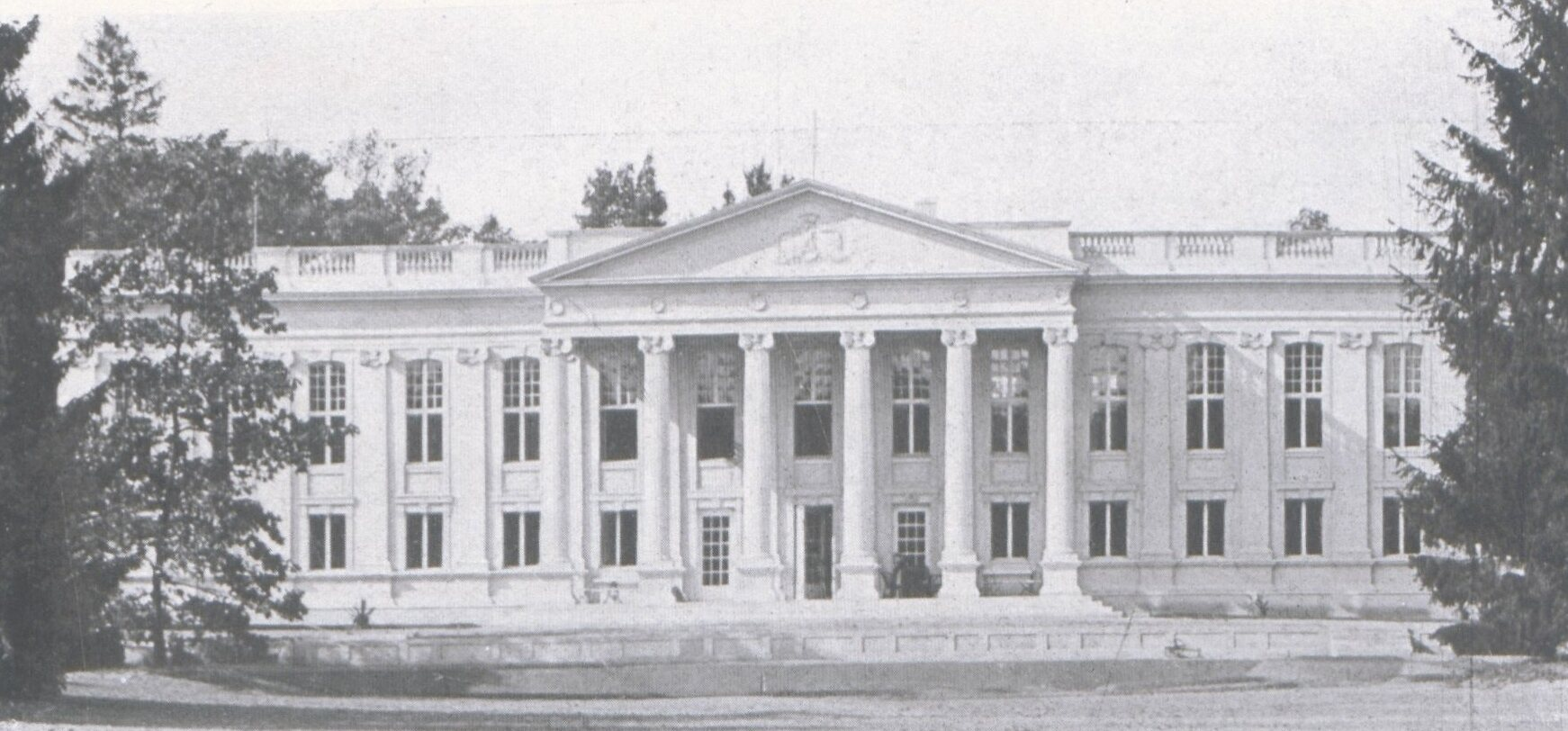
Mycielski Palace in 1909

After World War I, in November 1918, Poland regained independence as the Second Polish Republic, and the town returned to Poland several weeks later, when it was captured by Polish insurgents on January 5, 1919 during the Greater Poland Uprising.

With the 1939 Invasion of Poland, which started World War II, the town was occupied by Germany on 7 September 1939 and directly incorporated into the Nazi German Reichsgau Wartheland until the end of the war in 1945. The Polish population was subjected to various crimes, including arrests, expulsions and deportations to Nazi concentration camps. The Germans established and operated a prisoner-of-war camp for Polish POWs in the present-day district of Komorowo, which then served a transit camp for expelled Poles from the region, and was eventually converted into the Stalag XXI-C POW camp for Polish, French, British, Italian, American and Norwegian POWs. The occupiers also operated a Nazi prison, and a forced labour camp for Jews. Notable Polish sculptor and painter Marcin Rożek, who lived and worked in Wolsztyn, was arrested by the Germans and then imprisoned in the Fort VII in Poznań and the Auschwitz concentration camp, where he died in 1944. The local Polish police chief, three further local Polish policemen, a member of the local Polish resistance from World War I, a local notary, four graduates of the local teachers' college and four graduates of the local high school were murdered by the Russians in the Katyn massacre in 1940. The Polish resistance movement was active in the town and its environs.

From 1975 to 1998 it was administratively located in the Zielona Góra Voivodeship.

== Sights ==
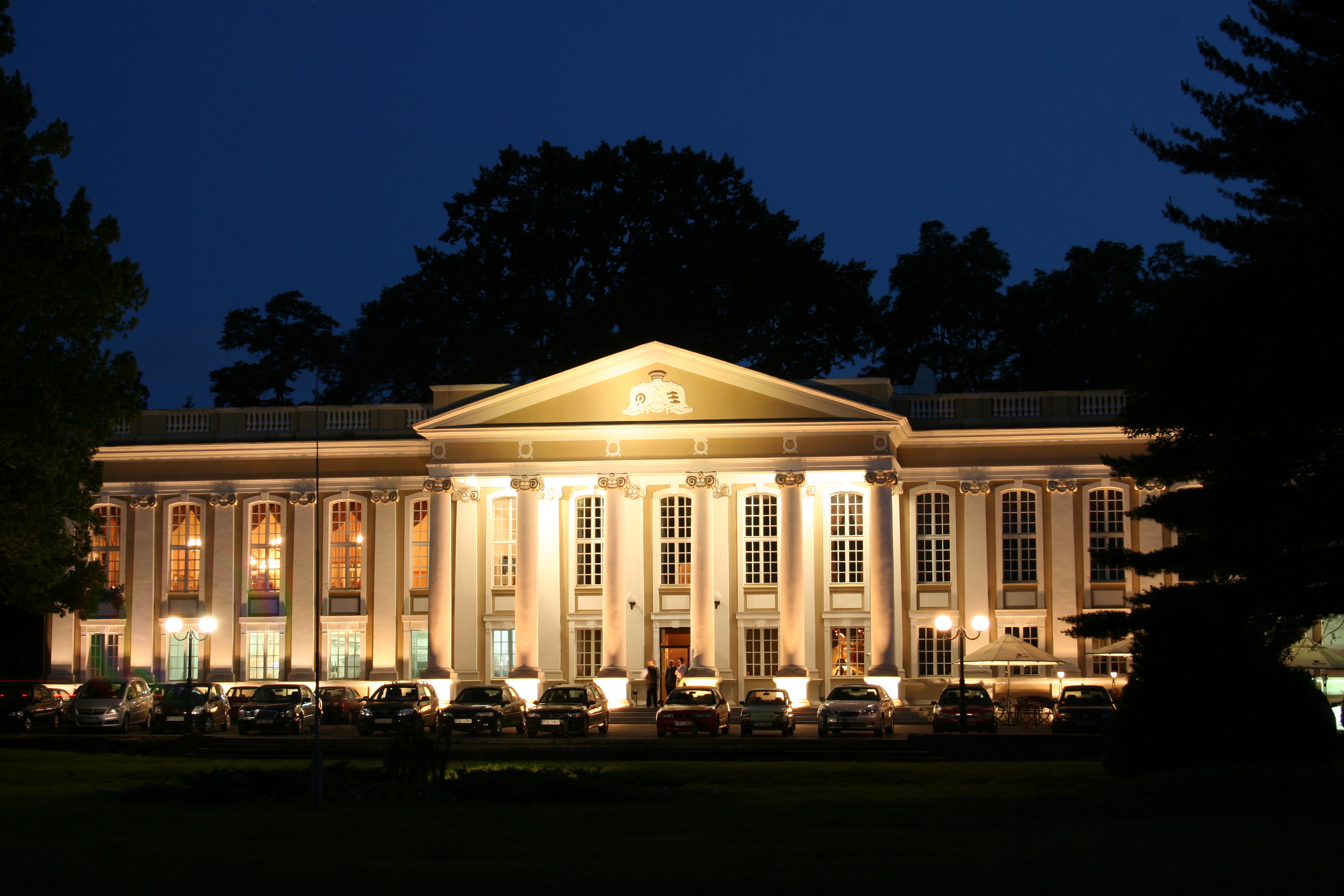
Mycielski Palace

The town has a Baroque parish church of the Immaculate Conception dating from the 18th century, a historical palace of the Gajewski and Mycielski noble families, which now houses a hotel, with an adjacent park, as well as several museums.

== Locomotive depot ==
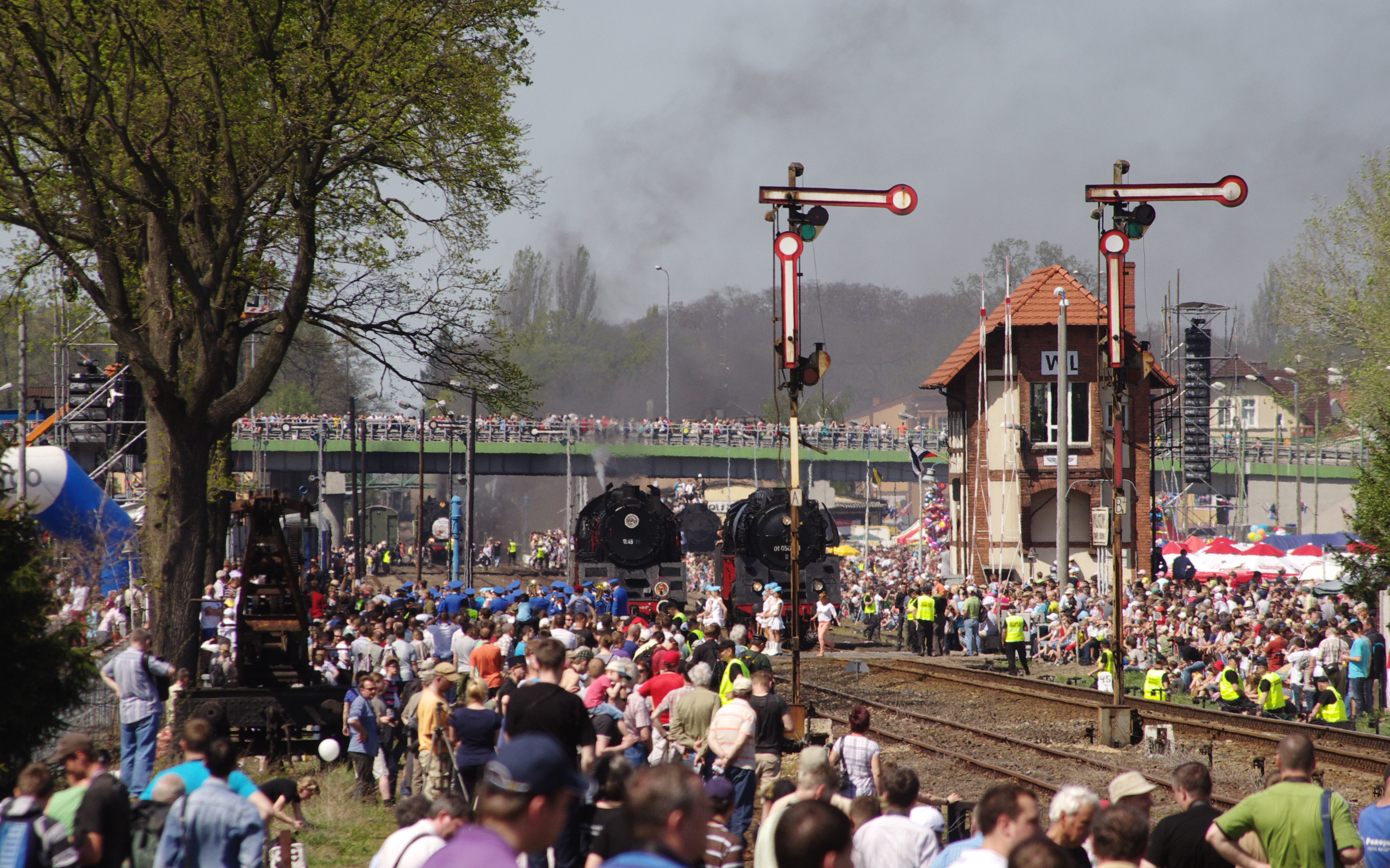
Steam Locomotives Parade in 2012

The railway line from Wolsztyn to Zbąszyń opened in 1886. The locomotive roundhouse in Wolsztyn is the only place in Europe to supply standard gauge steam locomotives for regular, timetabled train services on the national railway network. As of Autumn 2023 these services run to Leszno and Poznań, using timetabled steam engines. The site also includes a railway museum featuring restored locomotives.

Since 1993 the Polish State Railways organises an annual parade of locomotives, which takes place at the start of May. The 2007 event, which also celebrated the roundhouse's centenary, attracted about 20,000 visitors. The local (Polish) website has up-to-date information about services/events.

== Demographics ==
Historical population

Year	Pop.	±%
1910	4,509	—
1921	4,124	−8.5%
1931	4,580	+11.1%
1939	4,880	+6.6%

Year	Pop.	±%
1950	5,624	+15.2%
1960	6,856	+21.9%
2010	13,393	+95.3%

== Sport ==
The town is home to handball team KPR Wolsztyniak Wolsztyn. The local association football team is Grom Wolsztyn.

== Major corporations ==
- Inter Groclin Auto SA Wolsztyn + Grodzisk Wielkopolski

== International relations ==
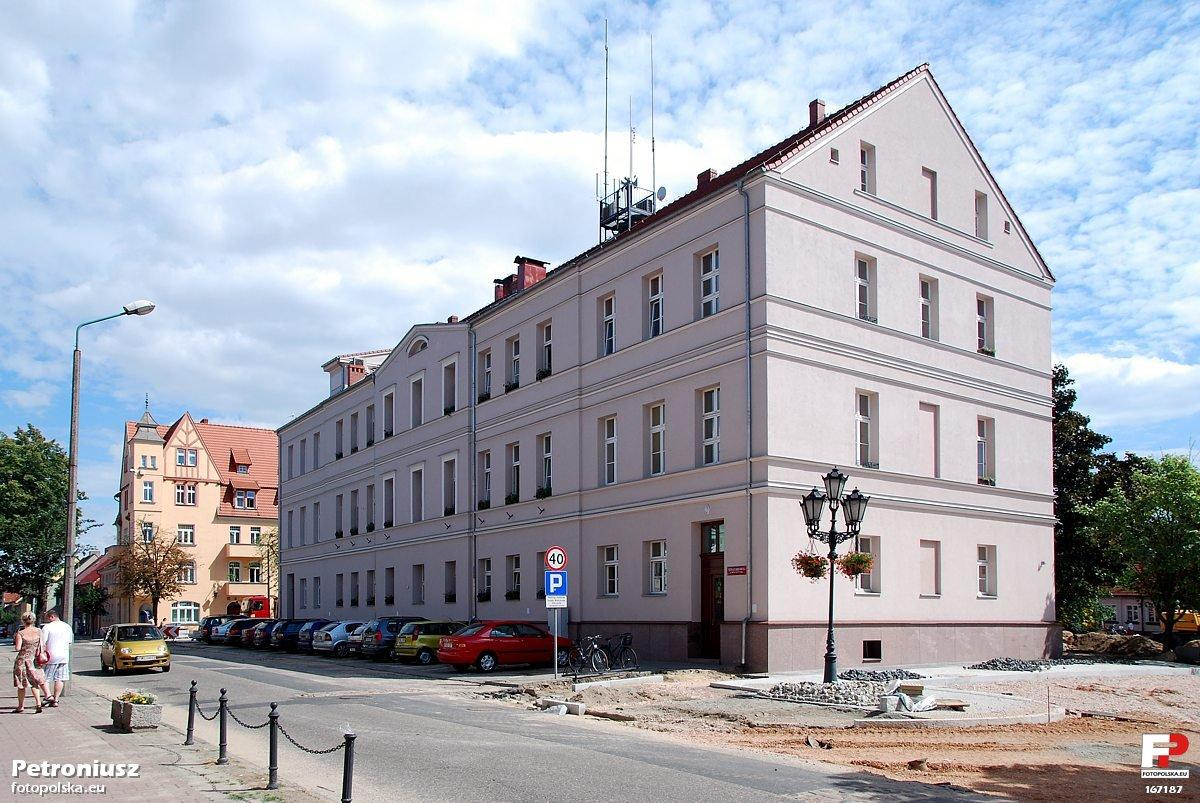
Town hall

=== Twin towns — Sister cities ===
Wolsztyn is twinned with:

- Lübben (Germany)
- Domont (France)
- Maasbree (Netherlands)
- Neunkirchen (Germany)
- Bad Bevensen (Germany)

== Notable people ==
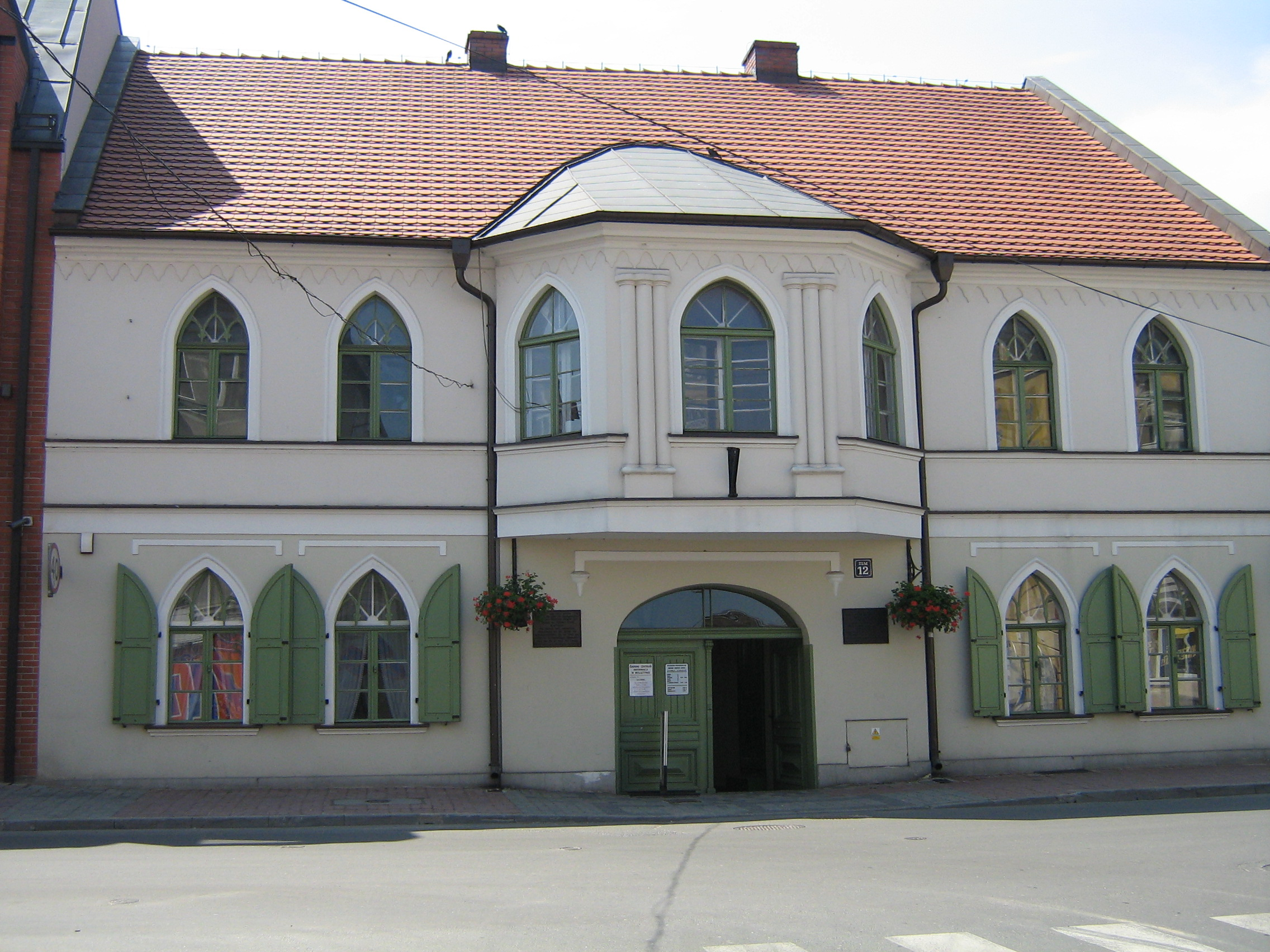
Robert Koch Museum

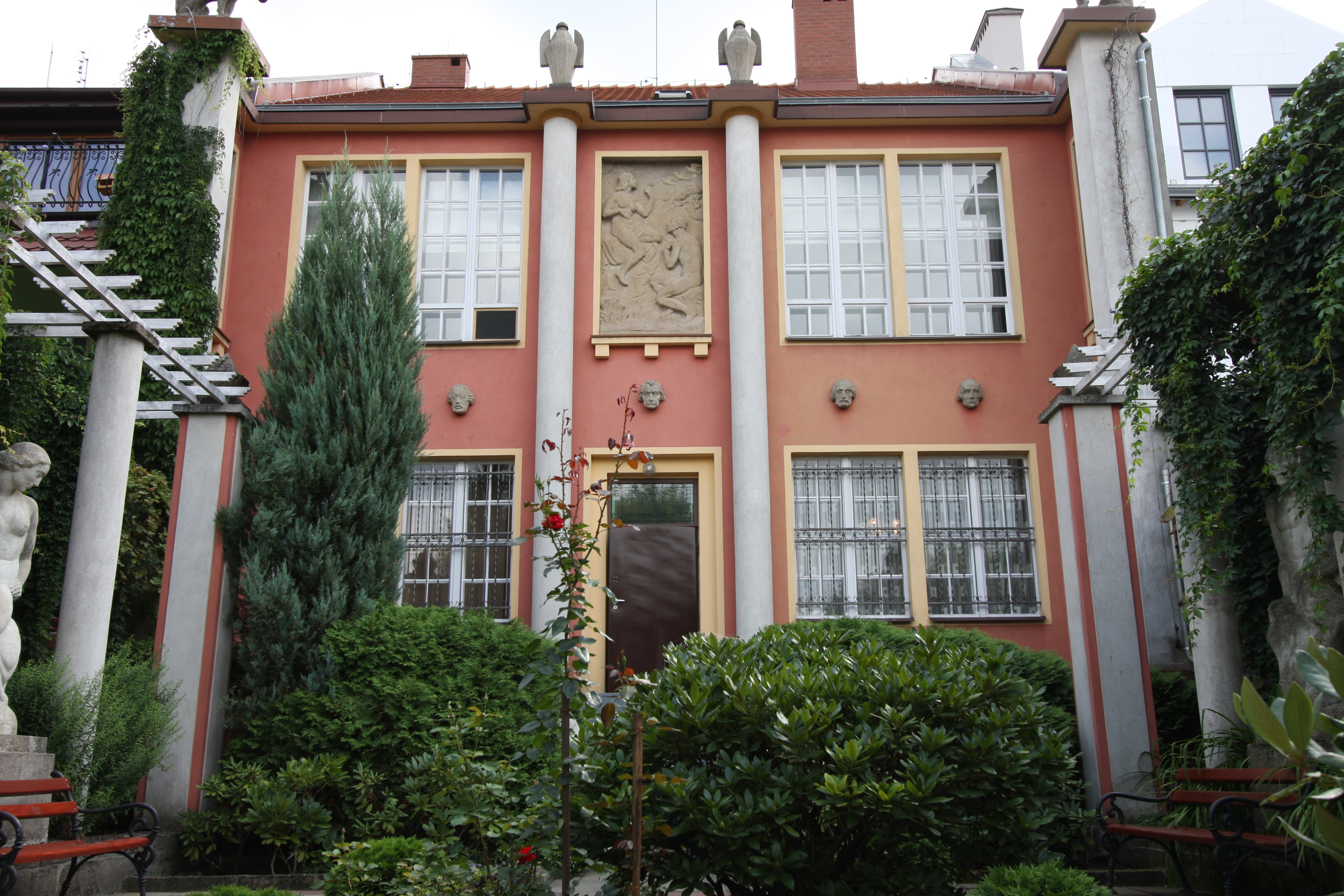
Marcin Rożek Museum

- Heinrich Graetz (1817–1891) — Jewish historian, attended yeshiva in Wolsztyn from 1831-1836.
- Max Samuel Grifenhagen — Sheriff of New York County 1913–16, present day Borough of Manhattan; his father, Benjamin William Grifenhagen, was born in Wolsztyn)
- Józef Maria Hoene-Wroński (1776–1853) — Polish mathematician known for the Wronskian determinant, philosopher, lawyer, participant of the Kościuszko Uprising
- Hans Jürgen Kallmann (1908–1991) — German painter
- Robert Koch (1843–1910) — German microbiologist known for Koch's postulates, worked as public health officer in Wolsztyn from 1872 to 1880
- Robert Kubaczyk (born 1986) — Polish athlete
- Hans von Kusserow (1911−2001) — German artist
- Ingeborg von Kusserow (born 1917) — German actress
- Stanisław Piosik (born 1946) — Polish politician
- William Rosenau (1865–1943) — rabbi
- Isaac Rosnosky (1846 – 1909) — American businessman and politician
- Marcin Rożek (1885–1944) — Polish sculptor and painter, killed in the Auschwitz concentration camp
- Adam Skórnicki (born 1976) — winner of the 2008 Individual Speedway Polish Championship

== Media links ==
- EchaRegionu.pl, news and information
