= KPR Wolsztyniak Wolsztyn =

Professional Polish handball club

- Full name: Klub Piłki Ręcznej Wolsztyniak Wolsztyn
- Short name: Wolsztyniak
- Founded: 5 November 1994
- Arena: Municipal Sports Hall, Wolsztyn
- Capacity: 478
- President: Kamil Jankowiak
- League: Men: I liga Group B Women: –
- Club colours

Wolsztyniak Wolsztyn is a professional Polish handball club from Wolsztyn, Greater Poland. It fields both a men's and women's senior team supported by 9 junior teams and 2 academy teams.

In 2019 the club celebrated 25th anniversary, although the club traces its roots to 1960s and a rich handball heritage of the town.

The men's team reached the 1/8th final of the 2010–11 Polish Cup, and have spent the majority of their history in the second tier of the Polish handball league pyramid. The club suffered in a country-wide financial handball crisis in 2018, which means they started form the bottom of the league pyramid.
