= Germania Wine Cellars =

- U.S. National Register of Historic Places
- U.S. Historic district
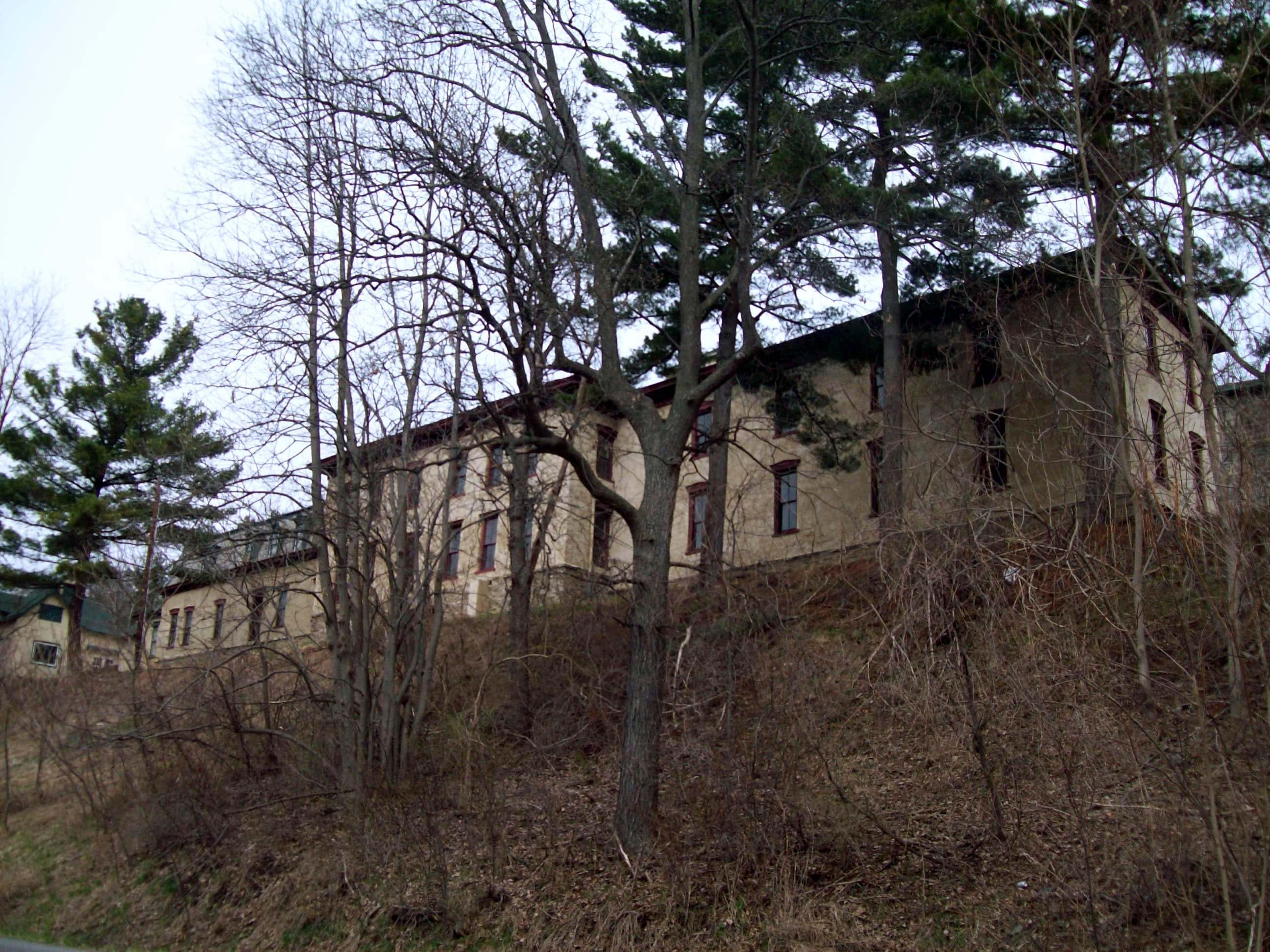
- Germania Wine Cellars, April 2011

- Location within New York Location within the United States
- Location: 8299 Pleasant Valley Rd., Hammondsport, New York
- Coordinates: 42°24′12″N 77°14′59″W
- Area: 4.6 acres (1.9 ha)
- Built: 1881
- Architect: Snow, Robert L.; Snow, Rogert G.
- Architectural style: Second Empire, Italianate
- NRHP reference No.: 00001289
- Added to NRHP: November 02, 2000

Germania Wine Cellars, or Olde Germania Wine Cellars, is a historic winery complex and national historic district located at Hammondsport in Steuben County, New York, United States. The complex was built in nine sections between 1881 and 1902. The majority of the buildings are built of local stone, portions of which are coated in stucco. The complex is currently used for barrel storage.

It was listed on the National Register of Historic Places in 2000.
