= Arboretum =

Botanical collection composed exclusively of trees

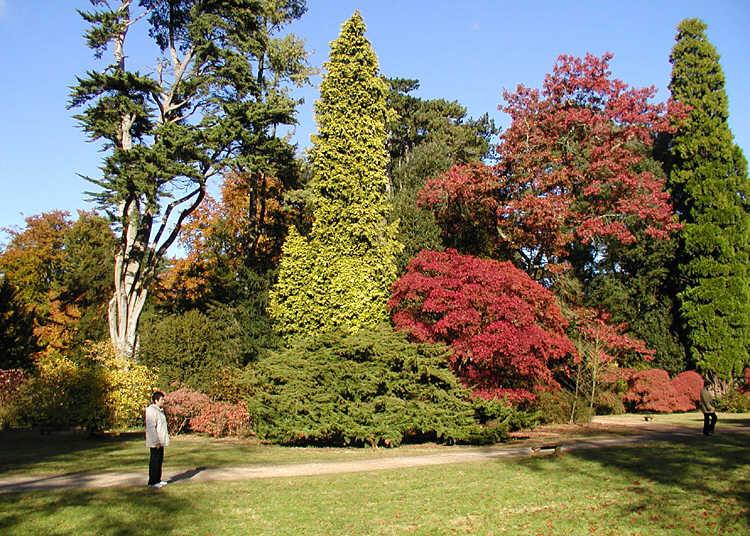
Autumn colours at Westonbirt Arboretum, Gloucestershire, England

An arboretum (pl.: arboreta) is a botanical collection composed exclusively of trees and shrubs of a variety of species. It is a living museum of trees and woody plants, grown and cared for by an organization committed to their stewardship. Originally mostly created as a section in a larger garden or park for specimens of mostly non-local species, many modern arboreta are in botanical gardens as living collections of woody plants and are intended at least in part for scientific study.

In Latin, an arboretum is a place planted with trees, not necessarily in this specific sense, and "arboretum" as an English word is first recorded as used by John Claudius Loudon in 1833 in The Gardener's Magazine, but the concept was already long-established by then.

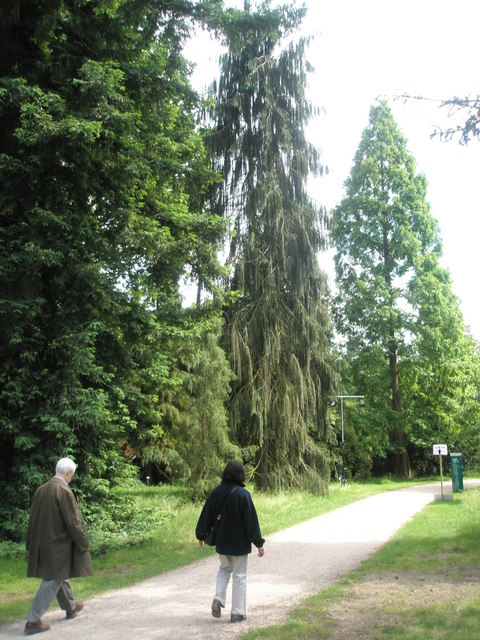
The pinetum section at RHS Wisley

An arboretum specializing in growing conifers is known as a pinetum. Other specialist arboreta include saliceta (willows), populeta (poplar), and querceta (oaks). Related collections include a fruticetum, from the Latin frutex, meaning shrub, much more often a shrubbery, and a viticetum (from the Latin vitis, meaning vine, referring in particular to a grape vine). A palm house is a large greenhouse for palms and other tender trees.

== History ==
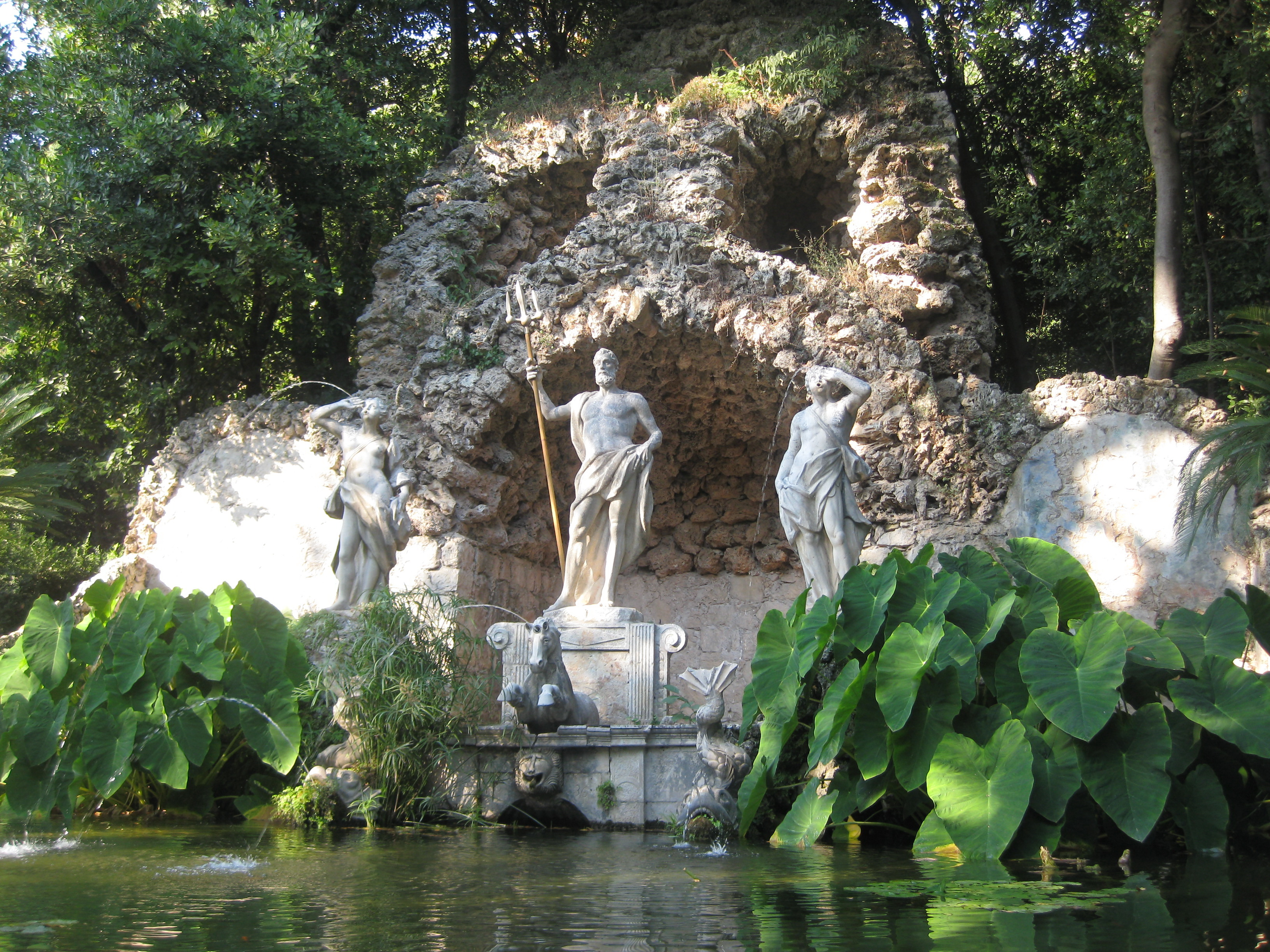
Neptune's fountain at Trsteno Arboretum in Croatia

Egyptian pharaohs planted exotic trees and cared for them; they brought ebony wood from the Sudan, and pine and cedar from Syria. Hatshepsut's expedition to Punt returned bearing thirty-one live frankincense trees, the roots of which were carefully kept in baskets for the duration of the voyage; this was the first recorded attempt to transplant foreign trees. It is reported that Hatshepsut had these trees planted in the courts of her Deir el Bahri mortuary temple complex.

Marco Polo describes how Kublai Khan collected specimens of evergreen trees that he admired from around the Mongol Empire in the late 13th century, and had them brought by elephant to his winter capital at Khanbaliq (modern Beijing), where they were planted on a large artificial mound, "a hundred paces in height and over a mile in cicumference", known as the "Green Mound", with a palace or pavilion at the top. The ground of the mound was also covered in pieces of green stone.

In an arboretum a wide variety of trees and shrubs are cultivated. Typically the individual trees are labelled for identification. The trees may also be organised in a way to aid their study or growth.

Many tree collections have been claimed as the first modern arboretum, with the term applied retrospectively as it probably did not come into use even orally until the later eighteenth century, or later. Probably the most important early proponent of the arboretum in the English-speaking transatlantic world was the prolific landscape gardener and writer, John Claudius Loudon (1783–1843) who undertook many gardening commissions and published the Gardener's Magazine, Encyclopaedia of Gardening and other major works. Loudon's Arboretum et Fruticetum Britannicum, 8 vols., (1838) is probably the most significant work on the subject in British history and included an account of all trees and shrubs that were hardy in the British climate, an international history of arboriculture, an assessment of the cultural, economic and industrial value of trees and four volumes of plates.

Loudon urged that a national arboretum be created and called for arboreta and other systematic collections to be established in public parks, private gardens, country estates, and other places. He regarded the Derby Arboretum (1840) as the most important landscape-gardening commission of the latter part of his career because it demonstrated the benefits of a public arboretum (for more details see below). Commenting on the Loddiges family's famous Hackney Botanic Garden arboretum, begun in 1816, which was a commercial nursery that subsequently opened free to the public, for educational benefit, every Sunday, Loudon wrote: "The arboretum looks better this season than it has ever done since it was planted... The more lofty trees suffered from the late high winds, but not materially. We walked round the two outer spirals of this coil of trees and shrubs; viz. from Acer to Quercus. There is no garden scene about London so interesting". A plan of the Loddiges' arboretum was included in The Encyclopaedia of Gardening, 1834 edition. Leaves from Loddiges' arboretum and in some instances entire trees, were studiously drawn to illustrate Loudon's encyclopaedic book Arboretum et Fruticetum Britannicum which also incorporated drawings from other early botanic gardens and parklands throughout the United Kingdom.

One example of an early European tree collection is the Trsteno Arboretum, near Dubrovnik in Croatia. The date of its founding is unknown, but it was already in existence by 1492, when a 15 m (49 ft) span aqueduct to irrigate the arboretum was constructed; this aqueduct is still in use. The garden was created by the prominent local Gučetić/Gozze family. It suffered two major disasters in the 1990s but its two unique and ancient Oriental Planes remained standing.

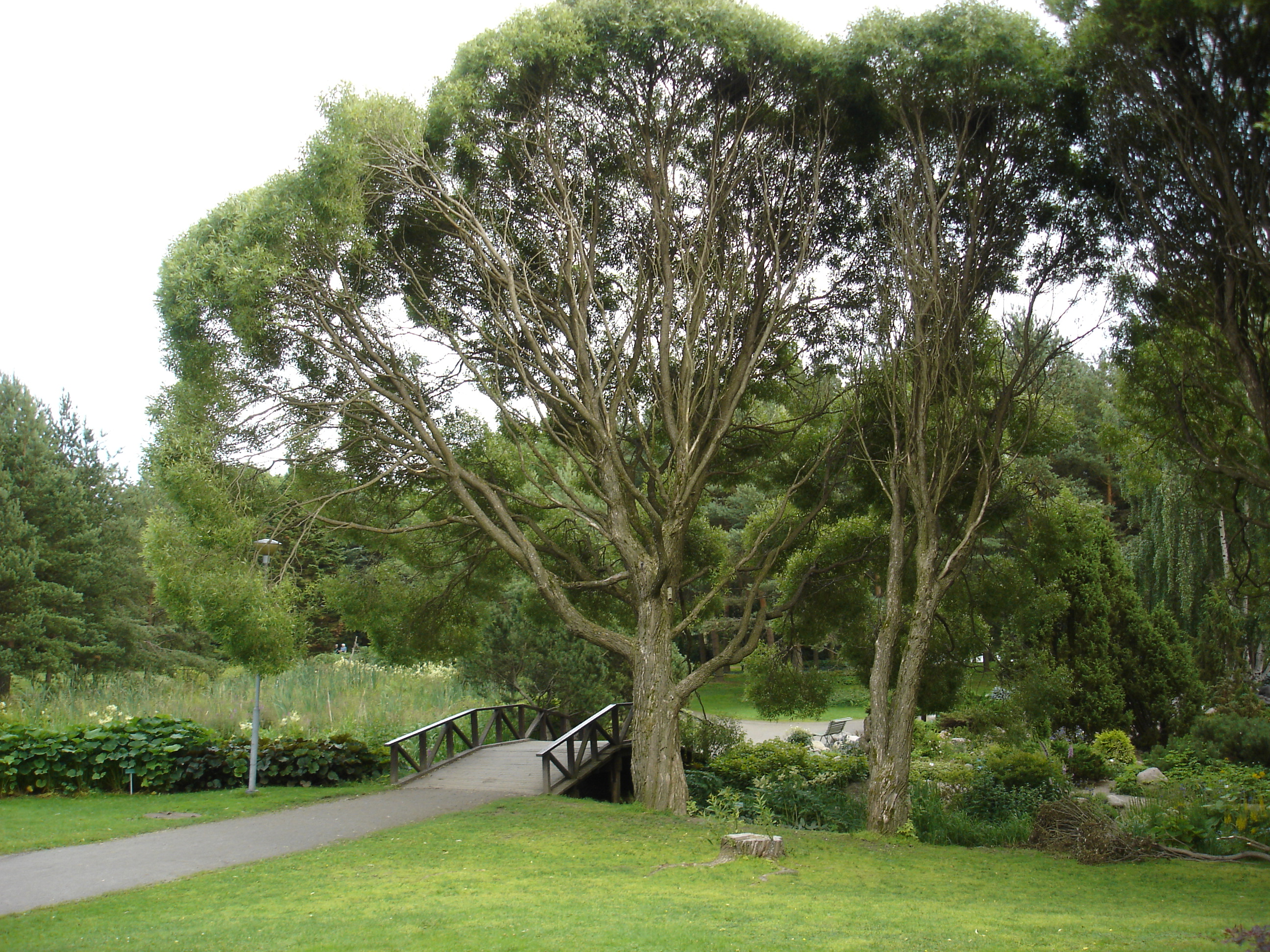
Hatanpää Arboretum, a 20th-century botanical garden in Tampere, Finland

== Later examples ==
=== Asia – India ===
Udhagamandalam (Ooty) Arboretum, The Nilgiris, India

The arboretum at Ooty was established in 1992 with an aim of conserving native and indigenous trees, and is maintained by the Department of Horticulture with Hill Area Development Programme funds. It occupies 1.58 hectares (3.9 acres) near Ooty Lake. The site is a micro watershed area and a natural habitat for both indigenous and migratory birds; prior to the creation of the arboretum it had been neglected, and the feeder line bringing water to the lake was contaminated with urban waste and agricultural chemicals. From 2005 to 2006 the Hill Area Development Programme provided funds of Rs 1,250,000 for the construction of permanent fencing, a footpath, and other infrastructure facilities.

=== Australia and New Zealand ===
Eastwoodhill Arboretum, Gisborne, New Zealand

Probably the largest collection of Northern Hemisphere trees in the Southern Hemisphere can be found at Eastwoodhill Arboretum, Ngatapa, Gisborne, New Zealand.

The arboretum is the realization of the dream of William Douglas Cook (1884–1967), who started planting trees on his farm shortly after the First World War. The arboretum is now the National Arboretum of New Zealand, and holds some 4,000 different trees, shrubs and climbers.

Taitua Arboretum, Hamilton, New Zealand

This arboretum was offered to Hamilton residents in 1997. Trees and shrubs were planted there from 1973 by John and Bunny Mortimer to provide shelter and shade for local animals. The arboretum is a popular picnic spot and is enjoyed by about 60,000 people every year. The twenty-two hectare arboretum contains 1500 species of trees and much birdlife.

RJ Hamer Arboretum, Victoria, Australia

Parks Victoria RJ Hamer Arboretum, Visitors to the RJ Hamer Arboretum can take a quiet stroll along the many walking tracks and roads providing access to the 126 hectares of breathtaking scenery that the Arboretum has to offer. The RJ Hamer Arboretum land is a small part of the original Dandenong and Woori Yallock State forest, proclaimed over 110 years ago. The RJ Hamer Arboretum is the first known occasion in which a forest style Arboretum was completely established by planting. A basic planting design was completed in 1970 and planting was carried out for the next 15 years.

The Tasmanian Arboretum, Devonport, Tasmania

The Tasmanian Arboretum was established in 1984 on the Don River in Devonport, Tasmania, Australia. The main site is 58 ha. There are over 2,500 plants in the geographic and thematic collections along with riparian revegetation. Maintenance of the collections is done by volunteers.

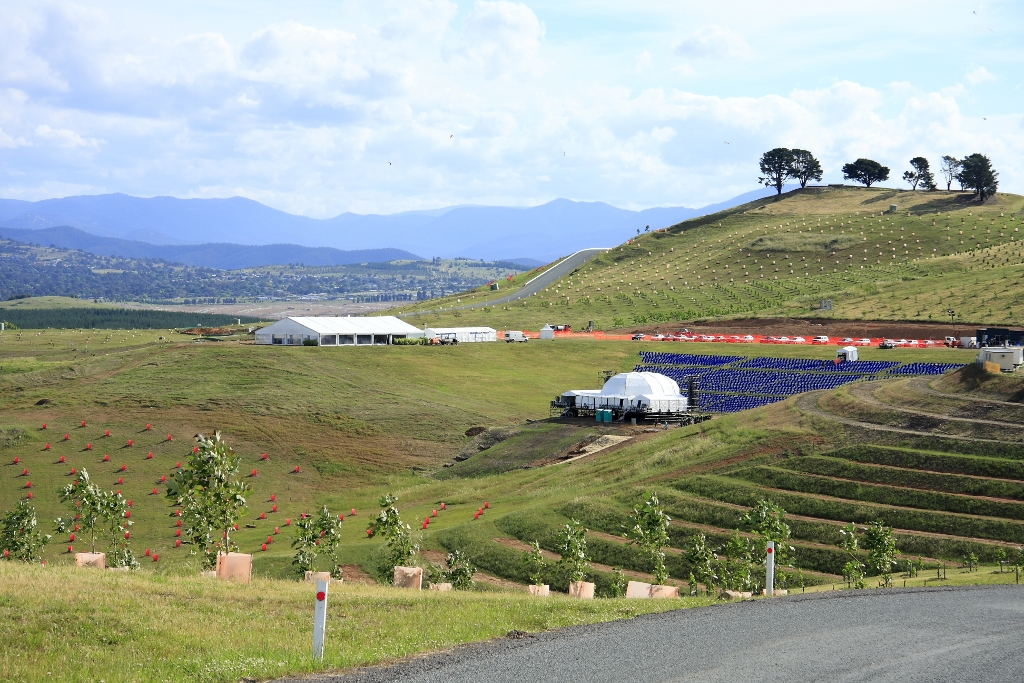
Looking South-South-East at the Event Pavilion from the Chinese Tulip Tree plantings at The National Arboretum Canberra.

The National Arboretum, Canberra, Australian Capital Territory

National Arboretum Canberra is being developed on a 250-hectare site in the Greenhills Forest areas west of the Tuggeranong Parkway and Lake Burley Griffin, Canberra, Australia. It includes an existing stand of 5000 Himalayan cedars and the 80-year-old cork oak plantation which were damaged by the 2001 and 2003 Canberra bushfires. It features different types of threatened and symbolic trees from around Australia and the world, including the world's largest planting of the Wollemi pine. There will eventually be 100 forests and 100 gardens with almost 80 forests planted already.

Lindsay Pryor National Arboretum, Canberra, Australian Capital Territory

Located at Yarramundi Reach on the shores of Lake Burley Griffin, the Lindsay Pryor National Arboretum is a 30-hectare site originally planted by Professor Pryor between 1954 and 1957 to improve the view from Government House.

=== Europe ===
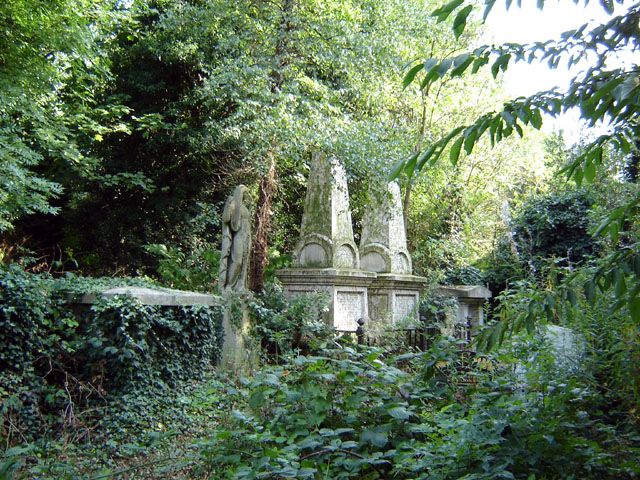
During part of the 18th century, Abney Park Cemetery was the largest arboretum in Europe.

Abney Park Arboretum, London, England

Shortly before the Derby Arboretum opened in 1840, another arboretum was opened for free public access at Abney Park Cemetery in Stoke Newington near London, modelled partly on Mount Auburn Cemetery near Boston and designed by Loddiges nursery. It was laid out with 2,500 trees and shrubs, all labelled and arranged in an unusual alphabetical format from A for Acer (maple trees) to Z for Zanthoxylum (American toothache trees). Until Kew was enlarged and opened to the public, this remained the largest arboretum in Europe. It never achieved the recognition of the better financed early nineteenth century botanical gardens and arboreta that could afford members' events, indoor facilities and curatorial staff for those who paid accordingly. However, unlike these, and even unlike the 'public' arboretum at Derby, the Abney Park arboretum always offered public access free of charge, though sometimes, by pre-arrangement; a Viewing Order was needed so as not to interfere with funeral events.

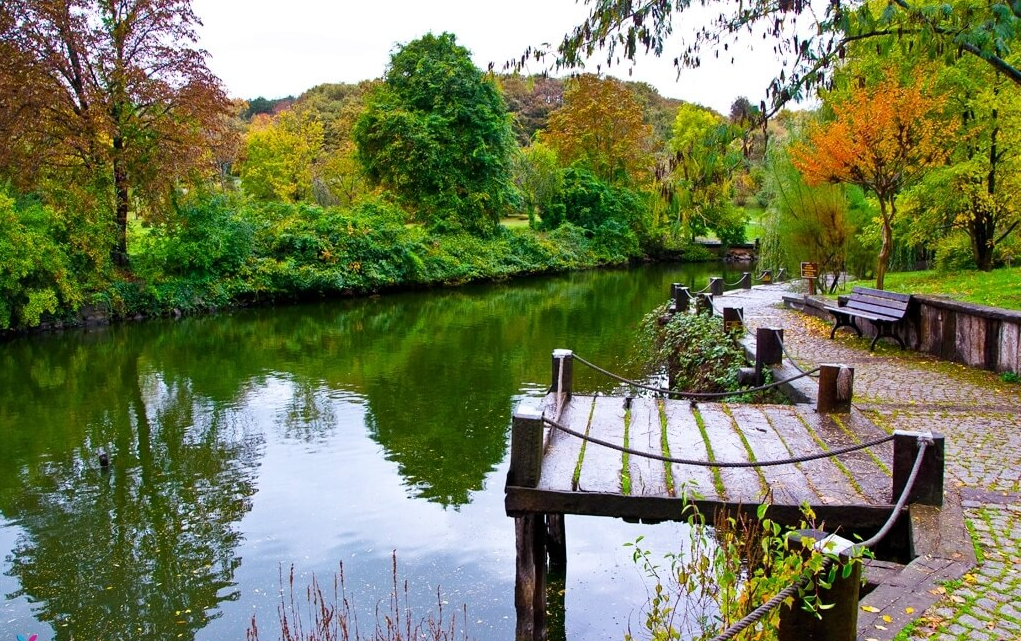
Atatürk Arboretum in Istanbul

Arboretum Norr, Umeå, Sweden

An arboretum containing mostly plants from Scandinavian countries.

Atatürk Arboretum, Istanbul, Turkey

Situated on the European side of Istanbul in the northern Sarıyer district, Atatürk Arboretum covers 296 ha (730 acres) adjacent to the Belgrad Forest. The arboretum also includes a rare plant nursery operated by Istanbul University Forestry Department.

Bank Hall Arboretum, Lancashire, England

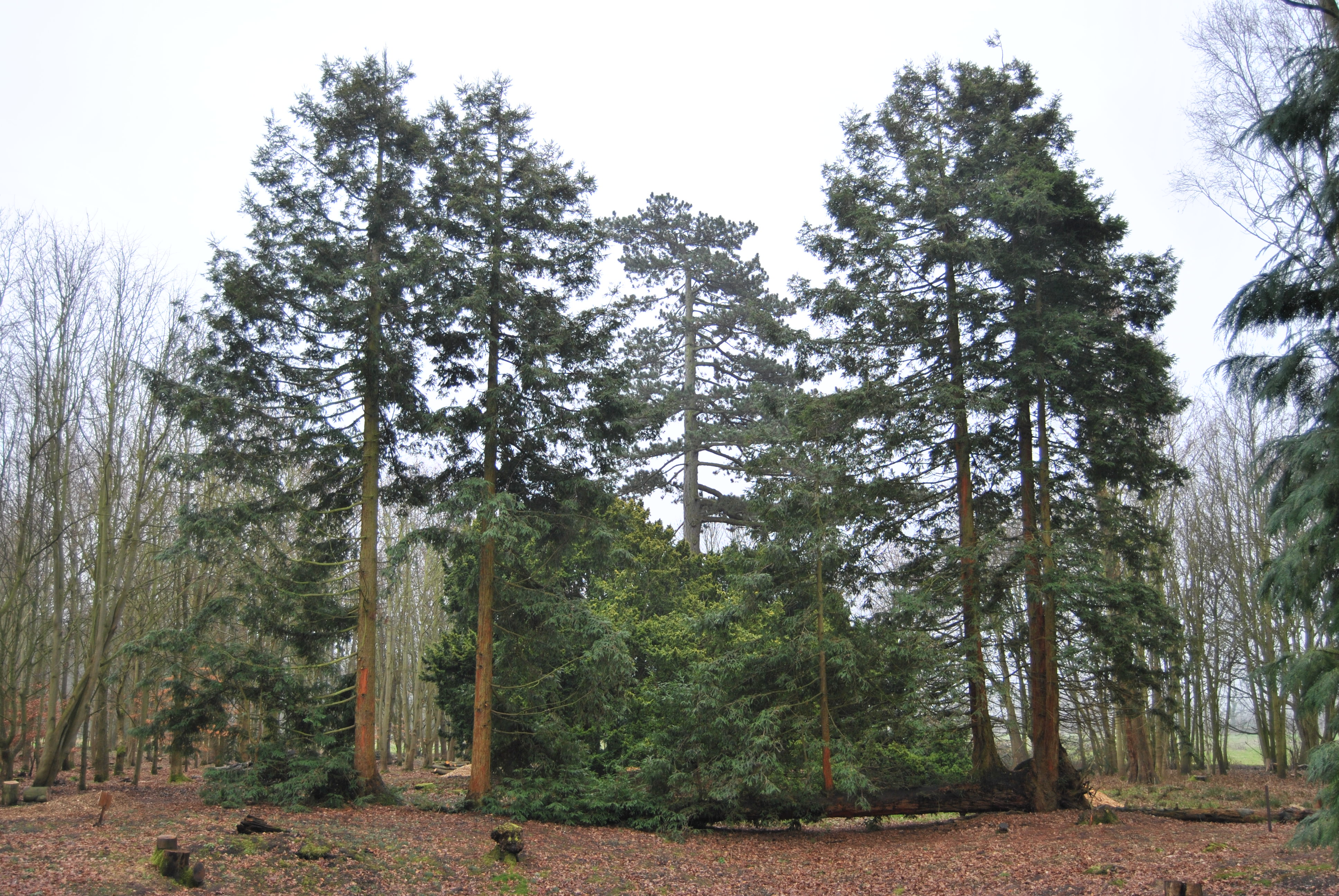
The 'Fallen Sequoia' at the Bank Hall Arboretum in January 2010

A small arboretum at Bank Hall Gardens, Bretherton in Lancashire, contains a yew thought to be at least 550 years old, the oldest in Lancashire. George Anthony Legh Keck had the arboretum planted in the gardens which were abandoned from the 1970s until 1995 when Bank Hall Action Group cleared the grounds. It contains one of two known fallen Sequoia sempervirens in the UK, Wellingtonia, dawn redwood (Metasequoia glyptostroboides), Atlas cedar (Cedrus atlantica), western hemlock (Tsuga heterophylla), Chinese swamp cypress and yew. Recent additions by the Action Group include paperbark maple (Acer griseum) (2004), cedar of Lebanon (Cedrus libani) (2005), further yew and pine trees (2006–2009) and a Ginkgo biloba (2011) for the Royal Wedding of the Duke and Duchess of Cambridge. It also has many specimens of snowdrop, daffodil and bluebell.

Batsford Arboretum, Gloucestershire, England

Situated one and a quarter miles west of Moreton-in-Marsh, Gloucestershire, Batsford Arboretum is tucked away on a south facing escarpment of the famous Cotswold Hills.

Bedgebury National Pinetum, Kent, England

Bedgebury National Pinetum, near Goudhurst, Kent is one of the world's most complete collections of conifers. The 300 acre Pinetum contains over 12,000 trees and shrubs (including 1,800 different species) from across five continents, many of them rare and endangered.

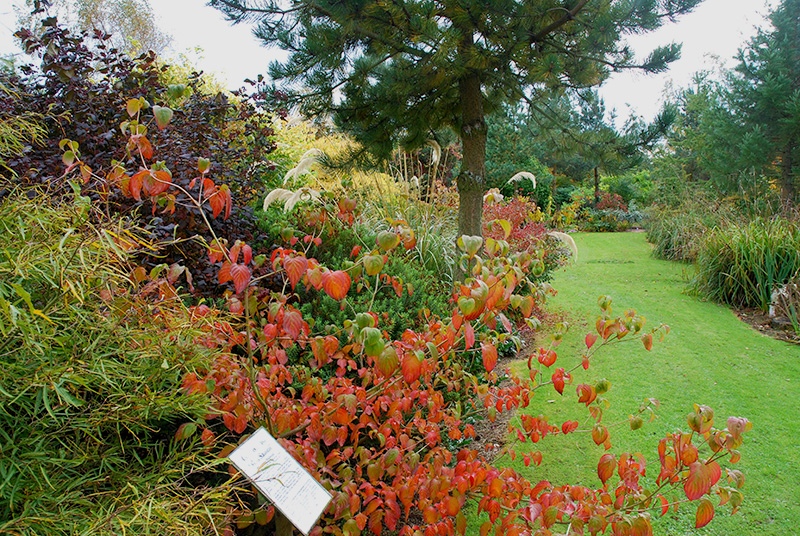
Autumn colour in Bluebell Arboretum: Many trees have educational labels as shown at bottom.

Bluebell Arboretum, Derbyshire, England

Located in South Derbyshire near Ashby-de-la-Zouch, with planting begun in 1992, this 9 acre Royal Horticultural Society recommended arboretum contains a large variety of rare but hardy plants and trees, including amongst many species a grove of giant redwoods and a substantial Liquidambar collection. The arboretum is extensively labelled with educational notes and information for many of the plants.

Bodenham Arboretum, Worcestershire, England

Wolverley, Kiddermister, Bodenham Arboretum has 156 acres (0.63 km^{2}) contains mature woodland, specimen trees and shrubs. With a collection of over 3,000 species of trees and shrubs it includes a number of collections such as Acers, North American Oaks and Alders. There are many species of insects and resident and migrating birds with the aquatic and wet margins to the pools provide a breeding ground for many water-fowl and frogs.

Derby Arboretum, Derbyshire, England

The Derby Arboretum opened on 16 September 1840. Commissioned and presented by Joseph Strutt (1766–1844) a wealthy industrialist and major local benefactor, the Derby Arboretum was designed by John Claudius Loudon and had a major impact upon the development of urban parks. It was one of the first Victorian public parks and also unusual for the quality of its collection of trees and shrubs. Although established on only quite a small site of 14 acres, the park featured a labelled collection of over 1000 trees and shrubs and was landscaped with mounds, sinuous paths, urns, benches, statues, lodges and other features. Managed by a committee until it was acquired by the Derby Corporation during the 1880s, the Derby Arboretum was only open free to the public for two days of the week for its first four decades, the remaining days being reserved for subscribers and their families and guests. Very popular anniversary festivals were staged annually which drew crowds of tens of thousands and helped to fund the upkeep of the park. The Derby Arboretum is also significant because it was the planted counterpart to Loudon's Arboretum et Fruticetum Britannicum (1838) which detailed all the hardy and semi-hardy trees and shrubs of the British Isles. Within the park, the trees and shrubs were laid out according to the natural system and labelled so that visitors could identify them using the guide.

The Derby park had a major impact on park design elsewhere including Europe, the British colonies and North America and other public parks and arboreta were established modelled on Loudon's creation and using his ideas. In 1859 for example, it was visited by Frederick Law Olmsted on his European tour of parks, and it had an influence on the planting in Central Park, New York. Industrial pollution killed most of the original plantings by the 1880s (although a few examples remain), but it has been renovated and replanted with National Lottery Heritage funding closer to Loudon's original layout and with a new cafe and visitor centre.

Dropmore Park, Buckinghamshire, England

Dropmore Park, Buckinghamshire (Bucks) England, was created in the 1790s for future prime minister Lord Grenville. On his first day in occupation, he planted two cedar trees. At least another 2,500 trees were planted. By the time Grenville died in 1834, his pinetum contained the biggest collection of conifer species in Britain. Part of the post-millennium restoration is to use what survives as the basis for a collection of some 200 species.

Dømmesmoen Arboret, Grimstad, Aust-Agder, Norway

Dømmesmoen Arboret is a 40 hectares (99 acres) arboretum in Grimstad Municipality in Agder county, Norway. In the Dømmesmoen forest, where the arboretum is planned in harmony with nature, 22 different ecosystems have been defined. The trees and plants have been planted along the tracks so that the visitors can experience and learn about them in the various ecosystems. Information about the various ecosystems are found along the tracks in the forest and park area. Through the years, approximately 700 different species of trees and plants have been planted in the Dømmesmoen area.

The Dømmesmoen area, where the arboretum is situated, has a fascinating history. Excavations have found traces of settlements that can be dated to around year 0. There are 50-60 burial mounds from pre-Viking area at Dømmesmoen, among the densest burial mound areas found in Norway. The most famous attractions at Dømmesmoen among locals are a 400-500 year old hollow oak, and a wooden tower overlooking the town of Grimstad which is located about 2 kilometres (1.2 mi) to the southeast. The medieval Fjære Church is situated about 2 kilometres (1.2 mi) to the northeast. The stone church was built around year 1150 and has significant historical value dating back to the Viking area.

Golden Grove / Gelli Aur arboretum, Carmarthenshire, Wales

Golden Grove / Gelli Aur Arboretum is a collection of mature trees and shrubs that spreads over 10 acres of the Golden Grove / Gelli Aur Country Park.

Commissioned by John Campbell, 2nd Earl Cawdor, the majority of the planting took place in 1865. It is an unusual, fine arboretum and celebrated in Victorian and Edwardian times as the finest in the UK. It is built in an arc as though embracing the house, fanning out from an ancient oak which stands at the top of the terraced lawn. The natural slope enhancing the view from the house. Many of the trees are champions, they love the damp, temperate climate. Several are on the Monumental Trees website. The Great Western Red Cedar is particularly spectacular, people come from all over the world to see it.

Herbaceous plants and bulbs were planted as part of the carpet, and American and Asiatic shrubs were planted to provide colour and fragrance. The Rhododendrons are an extremely fine single variety and present a spectacular display of colour in May and June. In the Summer the arboretum is bordered by white foxgloves, interspersed with shades of pink.

The arboretum is much loved by locals but it is an irony that the fame of its youth has been largely forgotten, unappreciated, in its magnificent maturity.

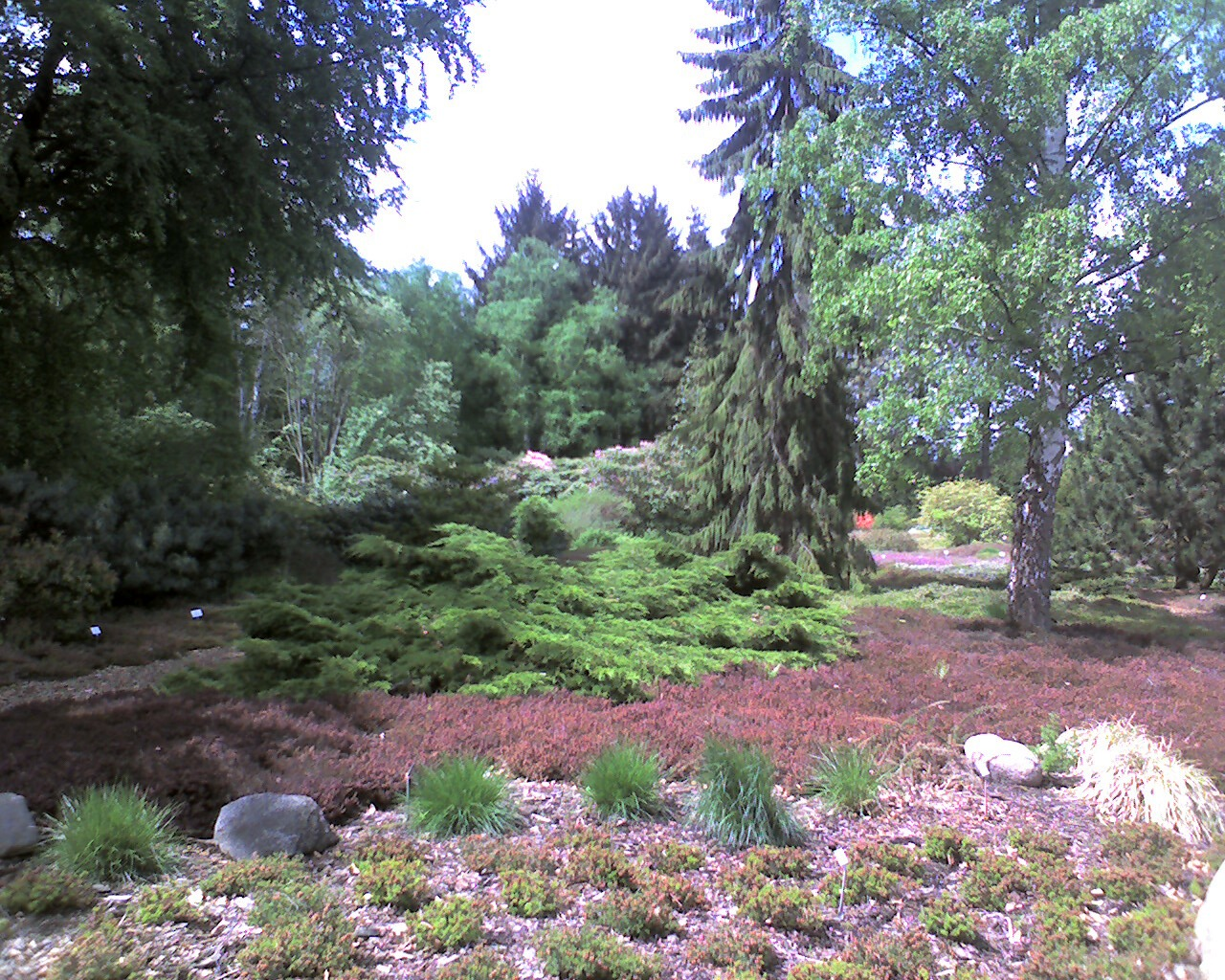
The arboretum of Greifswald Botanic Garden, Germany

Greifswald Botanic Garden and Arboretum, Greifswald, Germany

The Greifswald Botanic Garden and Arboretum (total area 9 hectares, German: Botanischer Garten und Arboretum der Universität Greifswald), was founded in 1763. It is one of the oldest botanical gardens in Germany, and one of the oldest scientific gardens in the world. It is associated with the University of Greifswald in Greifswald, Germany.

Jubilee Arboretum, Surrey, England

This is located at RHS Garden, Wisley, Surrey, England.

Kew Gardens, London, England

The Kew Gardens botanical gardens are set within an arboretum covering the majority of the 121-hectare (300-acre) site.

Kilmun Arboretum, Argyll and Bute, Scotland

Established in the 1930s, this Forestry Commission arboretum is at Kilmun, Argyll and Bute, Scotland.

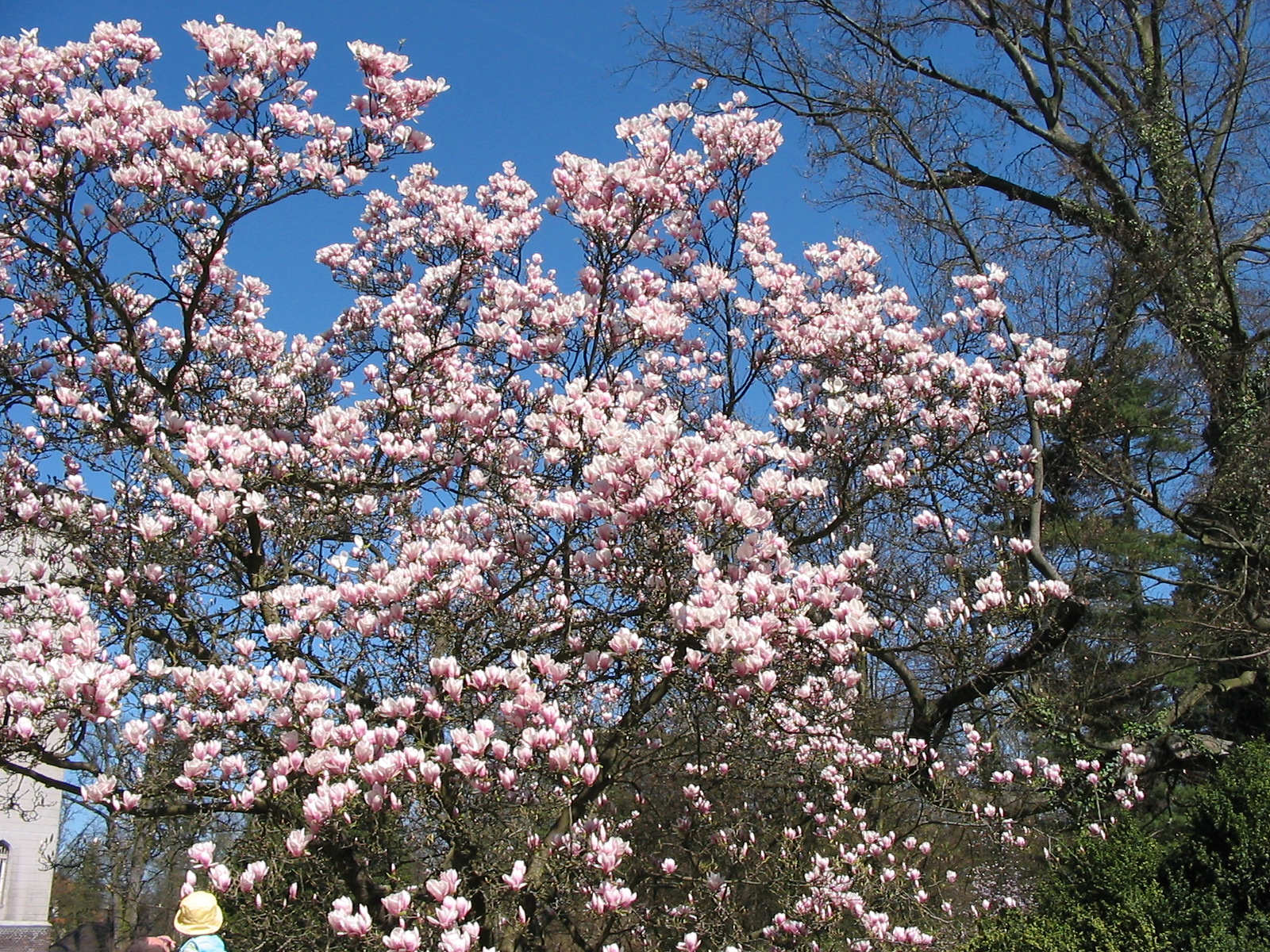
Magnolia near the Kórnik Castle in the Kórnik Arboretum

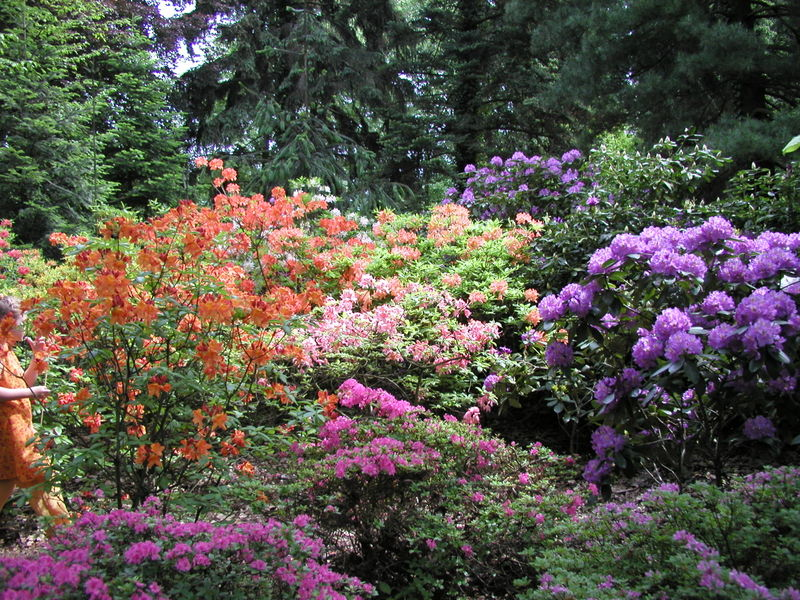
Rhododendrons, in the Kórnik Arboretum near the Kórnik Castle, Poland

Kórnik Arboretum, Poland

Established in the early 19th century around the historical Kórnik Castle by its owner, Count Tytus Działyński, later enriched by his heirs: his son Jan Kanty Działyński and Władysław Zamoyski. It is the largest and oldest arboretum in Poland. It covers over 40 hectares and is famous for rich collections of rhododendrons, azaleas, conifers, lilacc, and other woody species from all over the world. The Institute of Dendrology in Kórnik is located within the arboretum.

Lincoln Arboretum, Lincoln, England

Affectionately referred to as "The Arb" or "The Arbo", Lincoln Arboretum is to the east of the city and retains its line of sight up the hill to the nearby Lincoln Cathedral. This was one of the original design features. It was laid out between 1870 and 1872 by Edward Milner and has been renovated since 2002.

Arborétum Mlyňany, Slovakia

Arboretum Mlyňany is located in the area of two neighboring villages Vieska nad Žitavou and Tesárske Mlyňany near Zlaté Moravce, Slovakia. It was established in 1892 by Hungarian Count István Ambrózy-Migazzi. Today, it is governed by the Slovak Academy of Sciences. Within its 67 hectares (170 acres) area, the arboretum features more than 2,300 woody plant species, being one of the largest collections in Central Europe.

Nottingham Arboretum, Nottinghamshire, England

The Nottingham Arboretum (1852) was designed by Samuel Curtis as the centrepiece of a major scheme enclosing the common lands around the town. It included various public walks, parks, cemeteries and other green spaces. The Nottingham Arboretum was modelled on Loudon's Derby Arboretum and also originally had a systematic labelled collection of trees and shrubs. Advantage was taken on the hilly site to produce an attractive landscaped park with a small lake, lodges, benches and other features and some of the nineteenth-century trees still survive. Affectionately referred to as "The Arb", the Nottingham Arboretum it also gives its name to the residential area – in which it lies – of the City of Nottingham, England.

Arboretum de Pézanin, Dompierre-les-Ormes, France

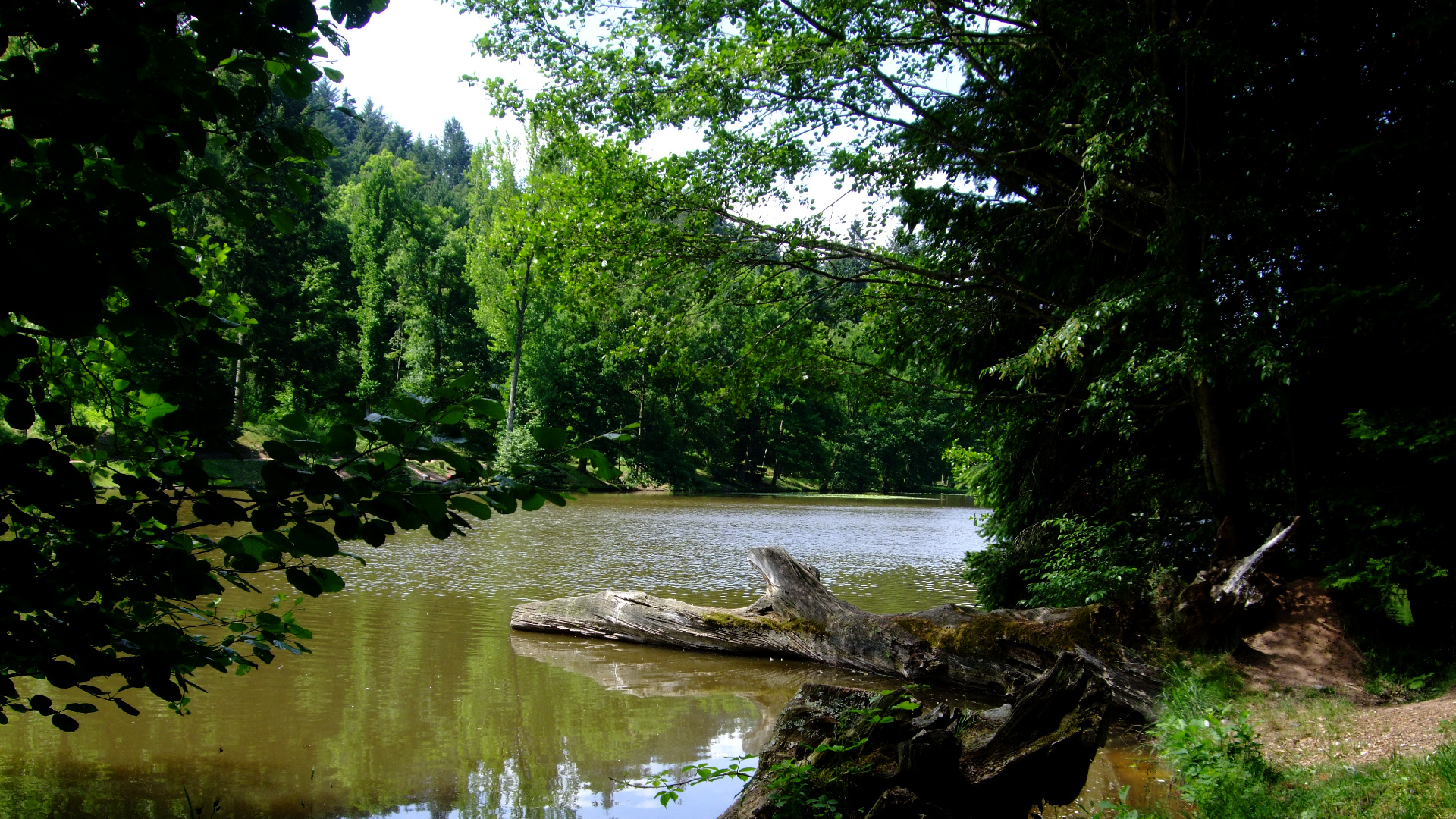
Arboretum de Pézanin and its lake

Located in Dompierre-les-Ormes, in South Burgundy, near Mâcon, the Arboretum de Pézanin was established in 1903 by French botaniquer Joseph-Marie-Philippe Lévêque de Vilmorin (1872–1917). Acquired by the state in 1935, it is now one of the richest collection in France, visited every year by thousands of tourists.

Průhonice Park, near Prague, Czech Republic

Průhonice Park in the Czech Republic is a National Heritage Site, and since 2010 has been included within the boundaries of the UNESCO World Heritage Site of Prague. The arboretum was founded in 1885 by Count Arnošt Emanuel Silva-Tarouca. 2,360 taxa (species and cultivars), of which 310 were evergreen and 2,050 deciduous taxa were planted in the park between 1885 and 1927. Today it contains over 1,200 taxa (species and cultivars) of broad-leaved trees, 300 of coniferous trees, and about 600 of perennial herbs.

Arboretum Wespelaar, Wespelaar, Belgium

Arboretum Wespelaar, in Wespelaar, Belgium, brings together trees and shrubs from the whole world. The arboretum focuses on: Acer, Magnolia, Rhododendron and Stewartia.

Westonbirt, England

The Westonbirt Arboretum, near Tetbury, Gloucestershire, England, was founded around 1828 as the private tree collection of Captain Robert Holford at the Holford estate. Holford planted in open fields and laid out rides before he rebuilt the house. Planting at Westonbirt was continued by his son, George Holford. Eventually the estate passed to the government in lieu of death duties and was opened to the public. Also the word "arbortorium" was changed to arboretum in the early 1950s. The arboretum comprises some 18,000 trees and shrubs, over an area of approximately 600 acres (240 ha). It has 17 miles (27 km) of marked paths which also provide access to a wide variety of rare plants.

St Roche's Arboretum, West Dean, England

The St Roche's Arboretum at West Dean College is a circuit walk 2.5 miles (4.0 km) long that encompasses a collection of specimen trees and shrubs. Edward James made a significant contribution to its planting, specialising in exotic, pendulous, contorted and twisted trees. It is also his final resting place – he is buried beneath a massive slab of Cumbrian slate inscribed by local artist John Skelton with the simple words "Edward James, Poet 1907 – 1984".

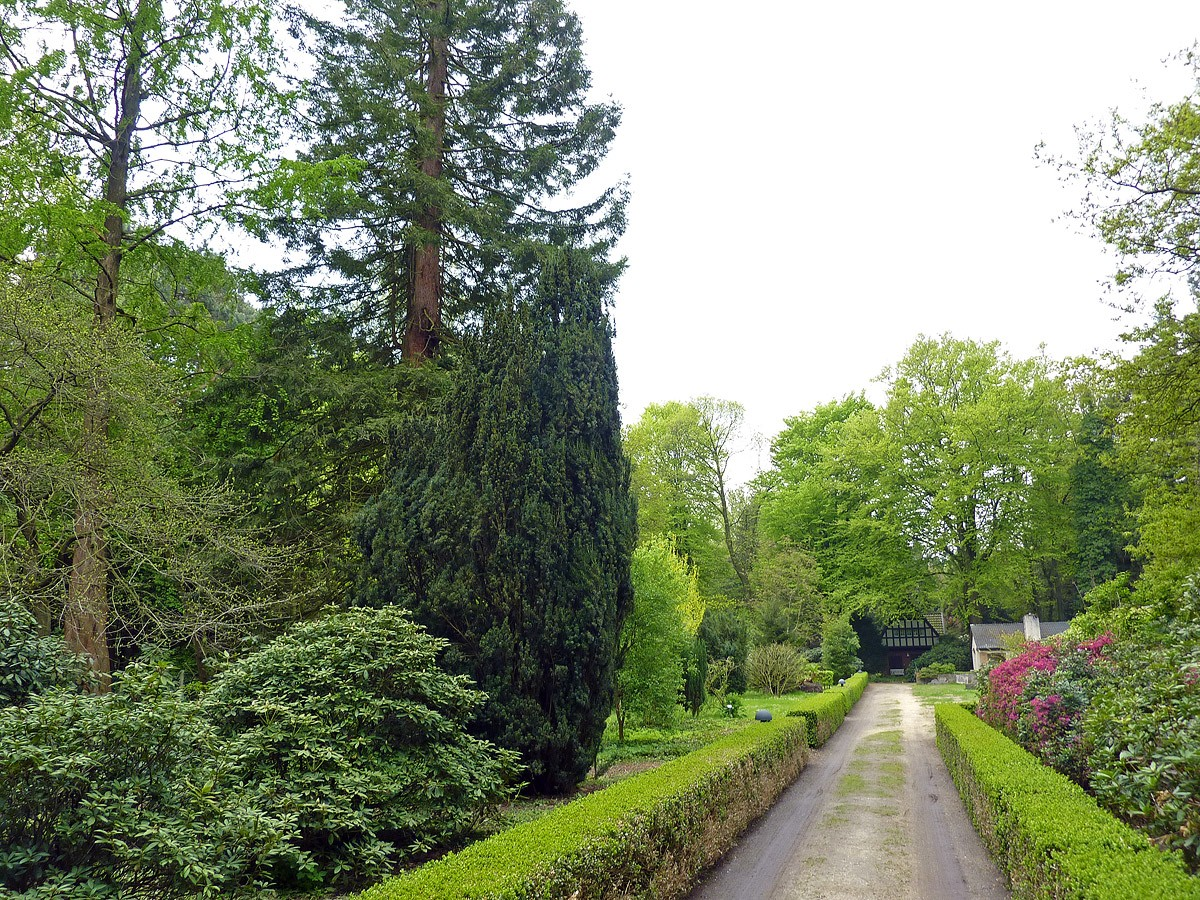
Arboretum Sequoiafarm Kaldenkirchen

Arboretum Sequoiafarm Kaldenkirchen, Nettetal, Germany

The Sequoiafarm Kaldenkirchen is a German arboretum that has been used as a biological institute for many years. It is situated close to the Dutch border in North Rhine-Westphalia and has 500 varieties of trees and an interesting ground flora. The founder Illa and Ernst J. Martin wanted to find out if the giant sequoia, which had existed in Germany before the ice age, could be introduced to German forestry.

Sochi Arboretum

Sochi Arboretum is a monument of landscape architecture located in the Khosta district of the city of Sochi, Krasnodar Krai, in Russia. It includes 76 species of pine, 80 species of oak, and 24 species of palm.

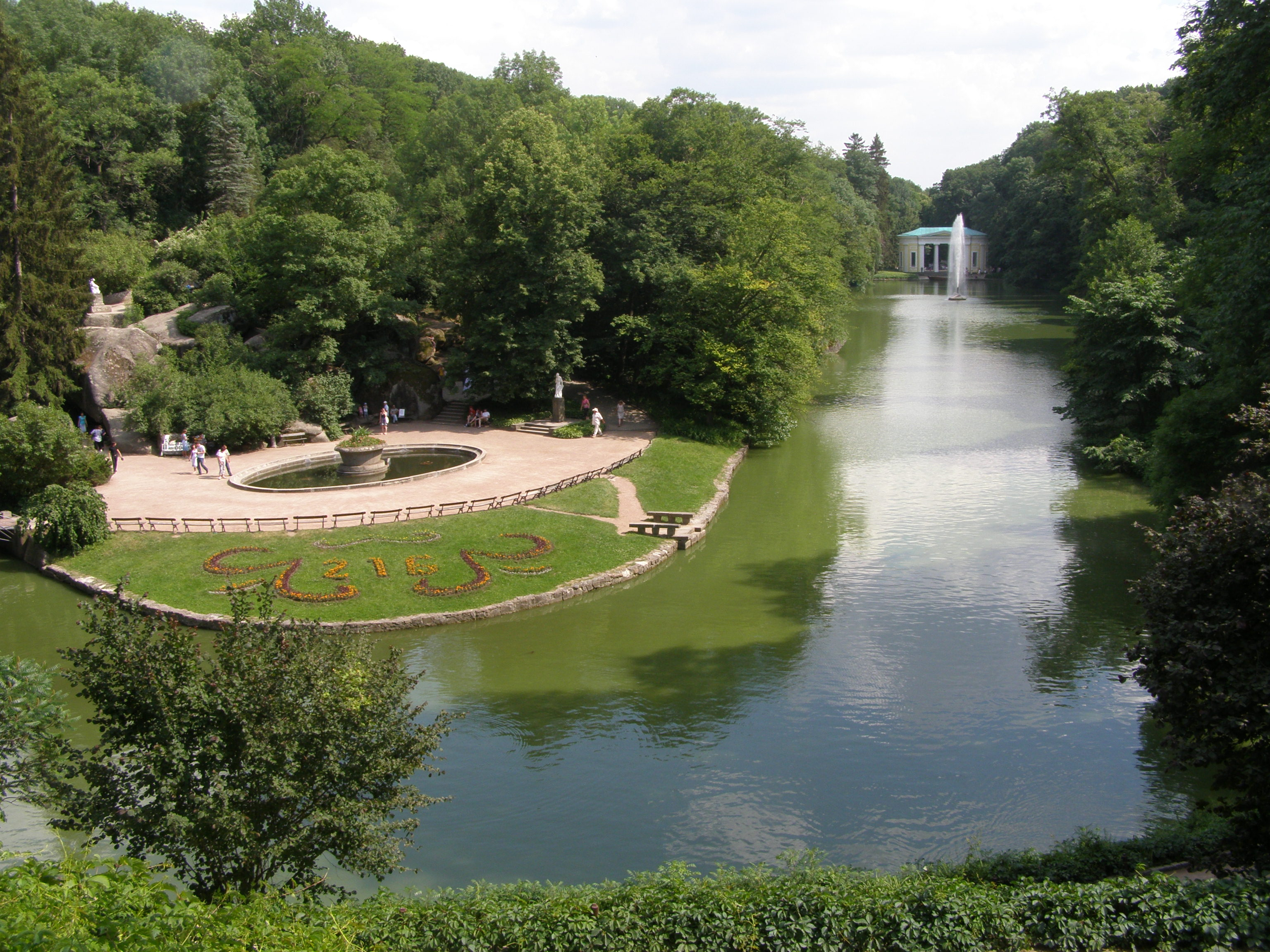
Sofiyivsky Park, Ukraine

Sofiyivsky Park, Ukraine

Sofiyivsky Park is an arboretum and a scientific-researching institute of the National Academy of Sciences of Ukraine. The park is located in the northern part of the Uman city, Cherkasy Oblast (Central Ukraine), near the river Kamianka. Some areas of the park are reminiscent of an English garden. Today the park is a popular recreational spot, annually visited by 500,000 visitors.

Sofiyivka is a scenic landmark of world gardening design at the beginning of the 19th century. The park accounts for over 2,000 types of trees and brush (local and exotic) among which are taxodium (marsh cypress), Weymouth Pine, tulip tree, platanus, ginkgo, and many others.

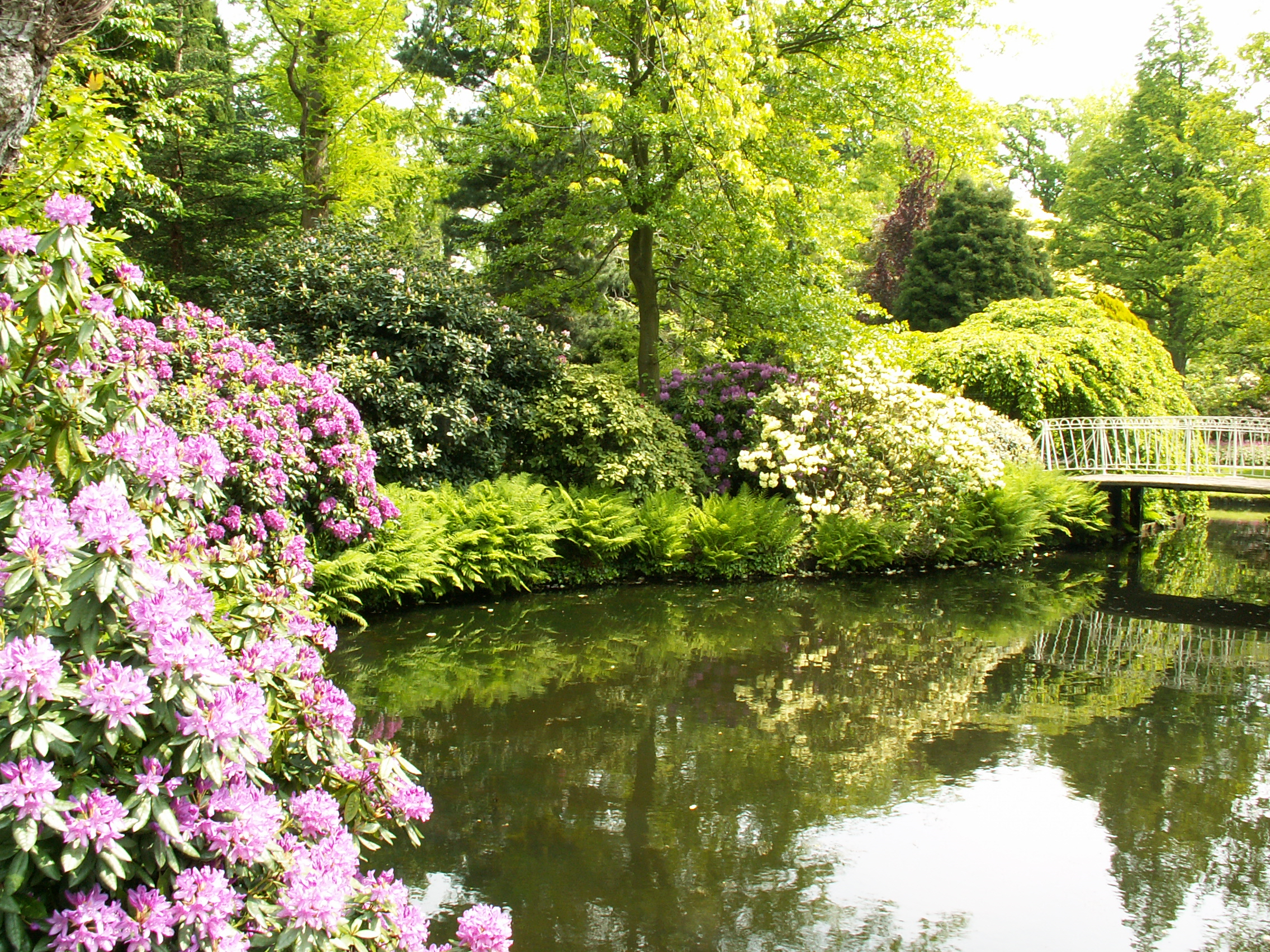
The Tropenburg Arboretum in Rotterdam, The Netherlands

Trompenburg Botanical Garden and Arboretum, The Netherlands

Arboretum Trompenburg is an arboretum with a botanical garden in Rotterdam, The Netherlands. It is situated next to the Erasmus University close to the center of the city of Rotterdam. The garden serves the scientific and botanical community, as well as serving as a recreational park where visitors can walk around or have a picnic on benches along the paths, or at the 'theehuis', a place where high-teas are served. It has an extensive collection of Rhodondendron, Quercus, Ilex, Cactai and succulents, Hosta and Fagus and Nothafagus.

Trsteno Arboretum

Trsteno Arboretum is located in Trsteno, Croatia. It was erected by the local noble family Gozze in the late 15th century, who requested ship captains to bring back seeds and plants from their travels. The exact start date for the arboretum is unknown, but it was already in existence by 1492, when a 15 m span aqueduct to irrigate the arboretum was constructed; this aqueduct is still in use.

Volcji Potok Arboretum, in Slovenia

Volčji Potok Arboretum is an 88-hectare arboretum, botanic garden and landscape park near Kamnik, Slovenia.

=== North America ===
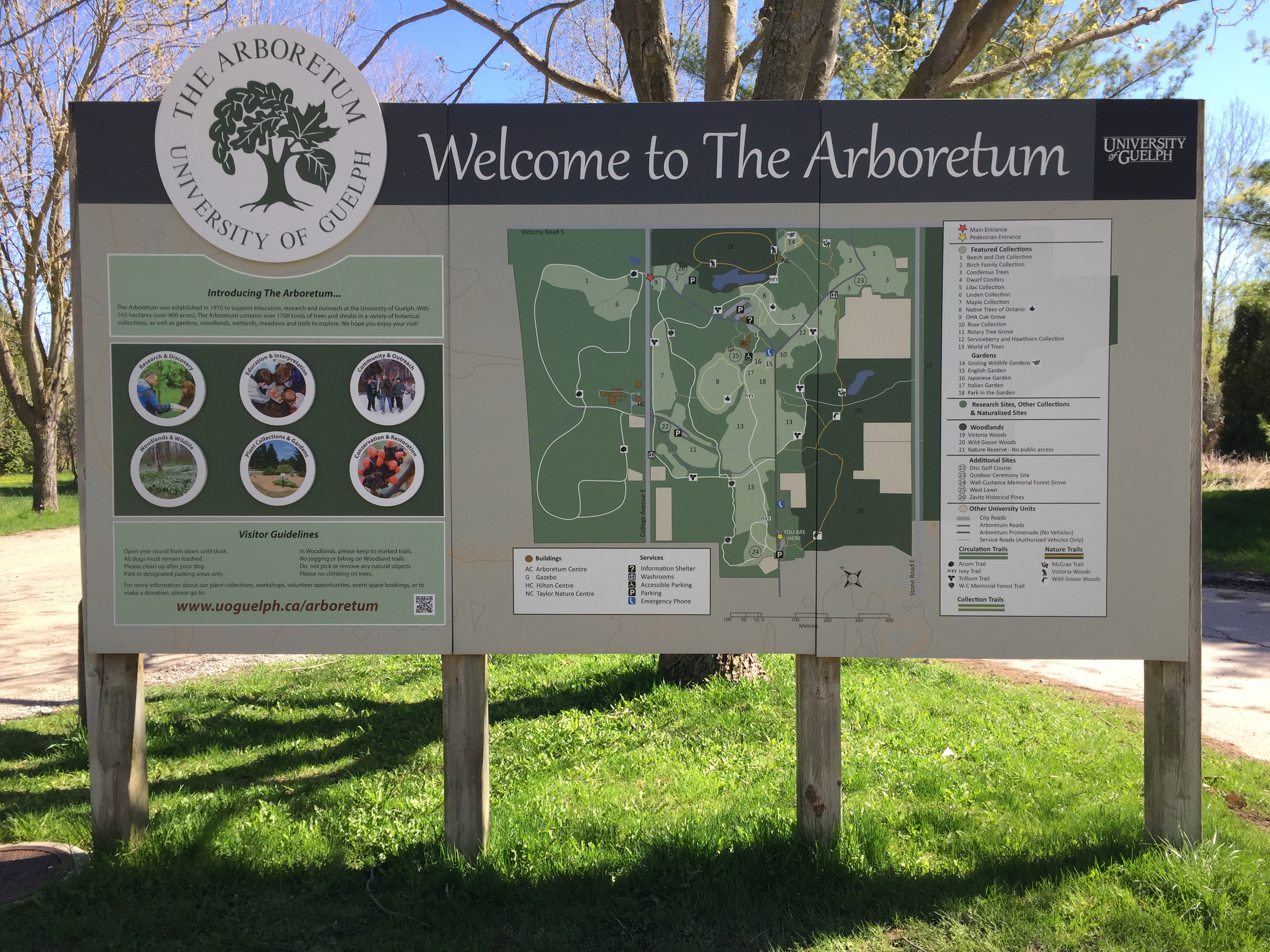
Map at the Entrance of the Arboretum, Guelph, Canada

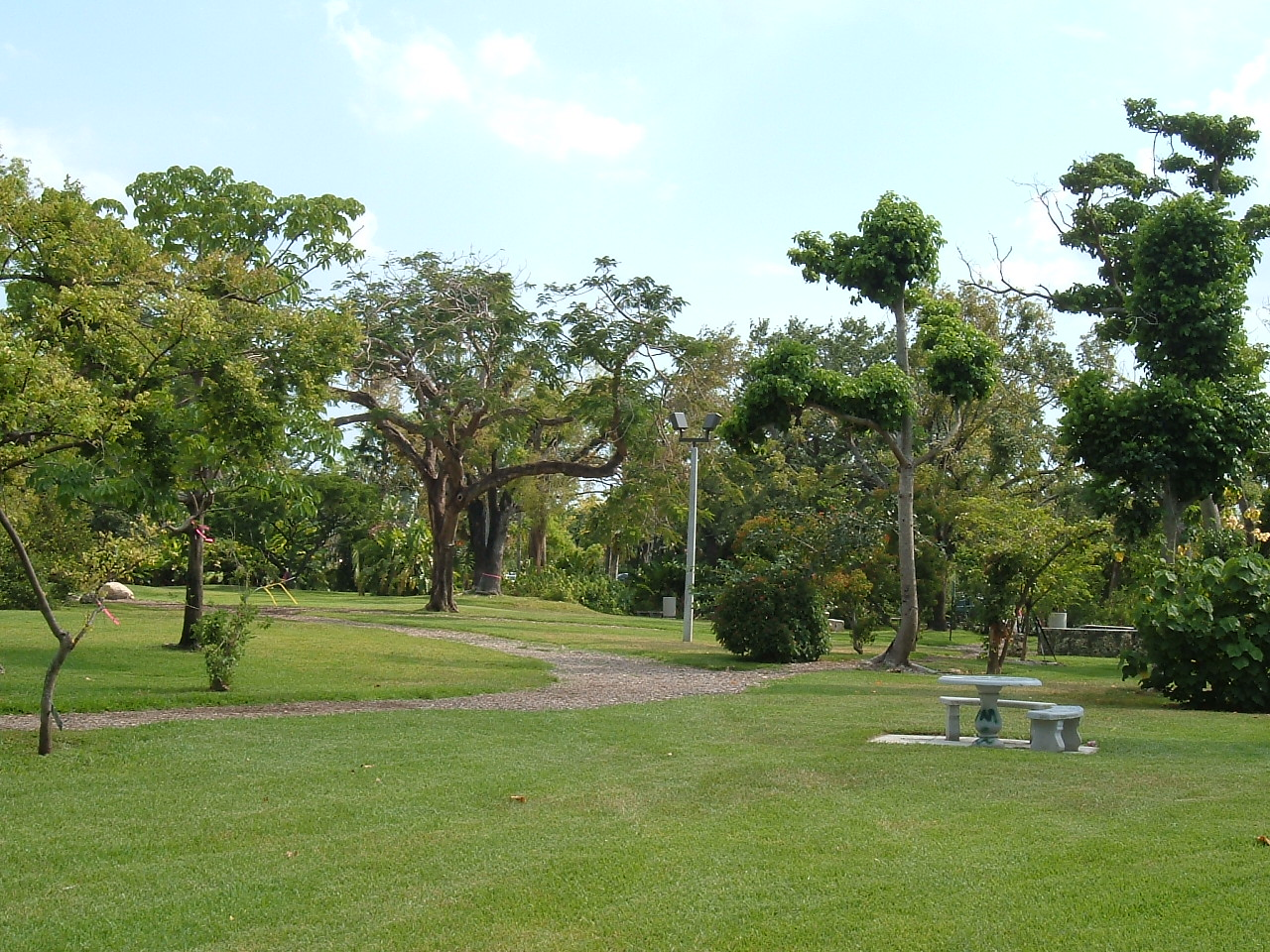
The John C. Gifford Arboretum, located on the campus of the University of Miami in Coral Gables, Florida, May 2006

University of Guelph Arboretum, Ontario, Canada

Arnold Arboretum, US

Harvard University's Arnold Arboretum in Jamaica Plain, Boston, Massachusetts, was established in 1872 on 265 acres (107 ha) of land in the Jamaica Plain section of Boston and was guided for many years by Charles Sprague Sargent who was appointed the Arboretum's first director in 1873 and spent the following 54 years shaping the policies. By an arrangement with the city of Boston, the Arnold Arboretum became part of the "Emerald Necklace", the 6.2-mile-long (10.0 km) network of parks and parkways that Frederick Law Olmsted laid out for the Boston Parks Department between 1878 and 1892.

The Dominion Arboretum Ottawa, Canada

Ottawa's Dominion Arboretum is located at the Central Experimental Farm of Agriculture and Agri-Food Canada. Originally begun in 1889, the arboretum covers about 26 ha of rolling land between Prince of Wales Drive, Dow's Lake and the Rideau Canal. At a latitude of 45°, it can experience extremely hot and humid summers and extremely cold winters. It displays a wide range of well-established trees and shrubs with the intention of evaluating their hardiness, including 1,700 different species and varieties.

Core Arboretum, US

The Core Arboretum is a 91-acre (37 ha) arboretum owned by West Virginia University and located on Monongahela Boulevard in Morgantown, West Virginia, United States. It is open to the public daily without charge.

The arboretum's history began in 1948 when the university acquired its site. Professor Earl Lemley Core (1902–1984), chairman of the Biology Department, then convinced President Irvin Stewart to set the property aside for the study of biology and botany. In 1975 the arboretum was named in Core's honor.

The arboretum is managed by the WVU Department of Biology, and consists of mostly old-growth forest on steep hillside and Monongahela River flood plain. It includes densely wooded areas with 3.5 miles (5.6 km) of walking trails, as well as 3 acres (1.2 ha) of lawn planted with specimen trees.

The arboretum has a variety of natural habitats in which several hundred species of native WV trees, shrubs, and herbaceous plants may be found. Some of the large trees are likely over 200 years old.

Edith J. Carrier Arboretum, US

The Edith J. Carrier Arboretum is located at James Madison University in Harrisonburg, Virginia, Groundbreaking took place in April 1985 under direction of Norlyn Bodkin, who is credited the first scientific botanical discovery along the Eastern Seaboard of Virginia since the 1940s: Trillium: Shenandoah Wake Robin, presently found at the arboretum. The only arboretum located on the campus of a Virginia state university, exhibits include an acidic sphagnum bog supporting northern species and insectivorous plants, the only shale barren with endemic species in an arboretum, rare endangered large-flowered azaleas, 125 acres (0.51 km^{2}) of mature Oak-Hickory Forrest including two identified century specimens, and a species on the U.S. Fish and Wildlife Threatened Species list found protected and propagated at the arboretum: Betula uber, Round-Leaf Birch. The university is seeking to expand the size of the arboretum from 63 acres to 110 by the fall season of 2027.

Holden Arboretum, US

The Holden Arboretum, in Kirtland, Ohio, United States, is one of the largest arboreta and botanical gardens in the United States, with over 3,400 acres (1,400 ha), 600 acres (240 ha) of which are devoted to collections and gardens. The arboretum is named for Albert Fairchild Holden, a mining engineer and executive, who had considered making Harvard University's Arnold Arboretum his beneficiary. However, his sister, Roberta Holden Bole, convinced him that Cleveland deserved its own arboretum. Thus Holden established an arboretum in memory of his deceased daughter, Elizabeth Davis.

Houston Arboretum and Nature Center, Houston, Texas, US

The Houston Arboretum and Nature Center is a 155-acre non-profit urban nature sanctuary that provides education about the natural environment to people of all ages. It plays a vital role in protecting native plants and animals in the heart of the city where development threatens their survival. The Houston Arboretum is a private nonprofit educational facility that operates city land.

Hoyt Arboretum, US

Located in Portland, Oregon, United States, the Hoyt Arboretum has over 190 acres (77 ha) and close to 8,300 different species of plants.

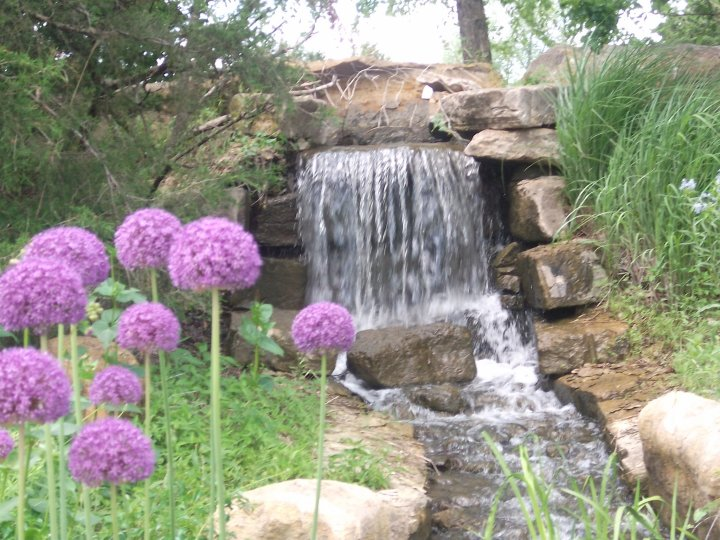
Waterfall and Flowers at the Overland Park Arboretum & Botanical Gardens, Overland Park, KS

Overland Park Arboretum & Botanical Gardens

Located at the southernmost tip of Kansas City (in southern Overland Park, Kansas) this arboretum was founded in 1997 and has a large prairie and forest. It has also added a new garden almost every year since it opened.

Humber Arboretum, Canada

Located in Toronto, Ontario, the Humber Arboretum includes 250 acres of ornamental gardens and diverse natural areas, including native Carolinian forests. First opened in 1977, the Humber Arboretum is a joint venture of the City of Toronto, Humber College, and Toronto and Region Conservation Authority. Its purpose is to establish and maintain quality plant collections, promote conservation and restoration practices, facilitate research and education, and provide a quality visitor experience.

The Centre for Urban Ecology, located in the Humber Arboretum, provides educational programming and children's camps centered on urban ecology. It also serves as a venue for sustainability-focused meetings, conferences, weddings, and events.

The Arboretum at Flagstaff, US

The Arboretum at Flagstaff, at 7,150 feet (2,180 m) above sea level, is a 200-acre (81 ha) arboretum that is home to, and focuses on, 2,500 species of mostly drought-tolerant adapted and native plants representative of the high-desert Colorado Plateau.

Los Angeles County Arboretum and Botanic Garden

Originally called Los Angeles State & County Arboretum, it is located in Arcadia, California.

Louisiana State Arboretum, Louisiana, US

The 600-acre (240 ha) Louisiana State Arboretum is located on Louisiana Highway 3042, approximately 13 km (eight miles) north of Ville Platte, Louisiana, inside of Chicot State Park, USA, and bordering a branch of Lake Chicot. Established in 1961, it is the oldest state-supported arboretum in the United States. The arboretum contains over 150 species of plant life native to Louisiana, on a varied topography suitable for nearly all Louisiana vegetation except those of the prairies and coastal marshes. The arboretum is a mature Beech-Magnolia forest containing centuries-old giant beech, magnolia, oak, and ash trees, as well as ferns, hickories, maples, sycamores, and crane fly orchids. Wildlife includes white-tail deer, fox, opossum, raccoon, skunk, squirrel, wild turkey, and numerous other bird species.

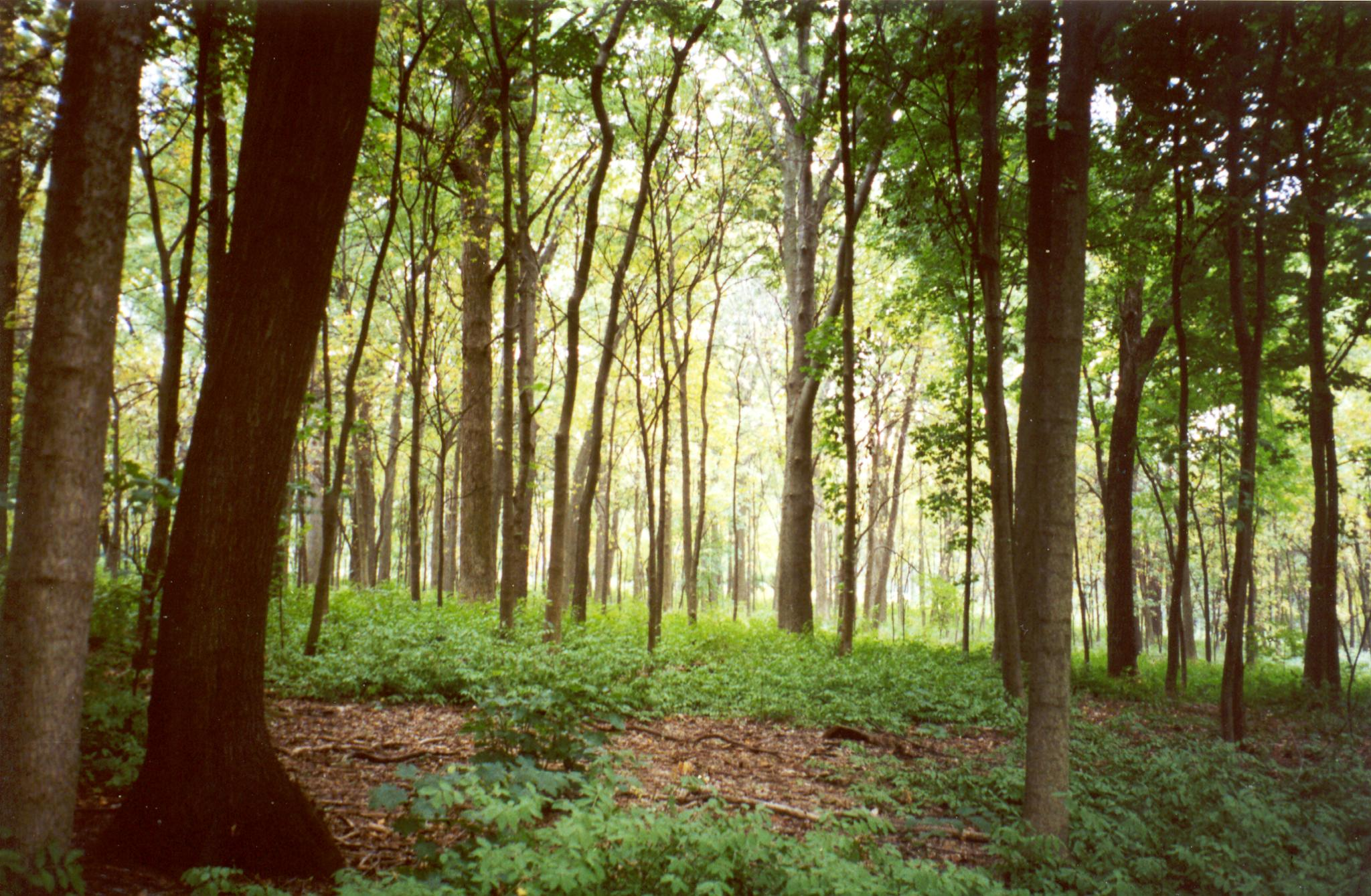
A woodland ecosystem in the Morton Arboretum

Morton Arboretum, US

Located in Lisle, Illinois, the Morton Arboretum was founded in 1922 by Joy Morton, founder of the Morton Salt Company and son of Arbor Day originator Julius Sterling Morton. At 1,700 acres (690 ha) the Arboretum is one of the largest in the world, and features several mature deciduous and coniferous forests, as well as collections of plant life from around the globe, in addition to ten lakes, several wetlands, and a 99 acres (40 ha) restored prairie.

Peru State College Arboretum, Nebraska, US

Peru State College's "Campus of a Thousand Oaks," an arboretum campus, is in southeast Nebraska.

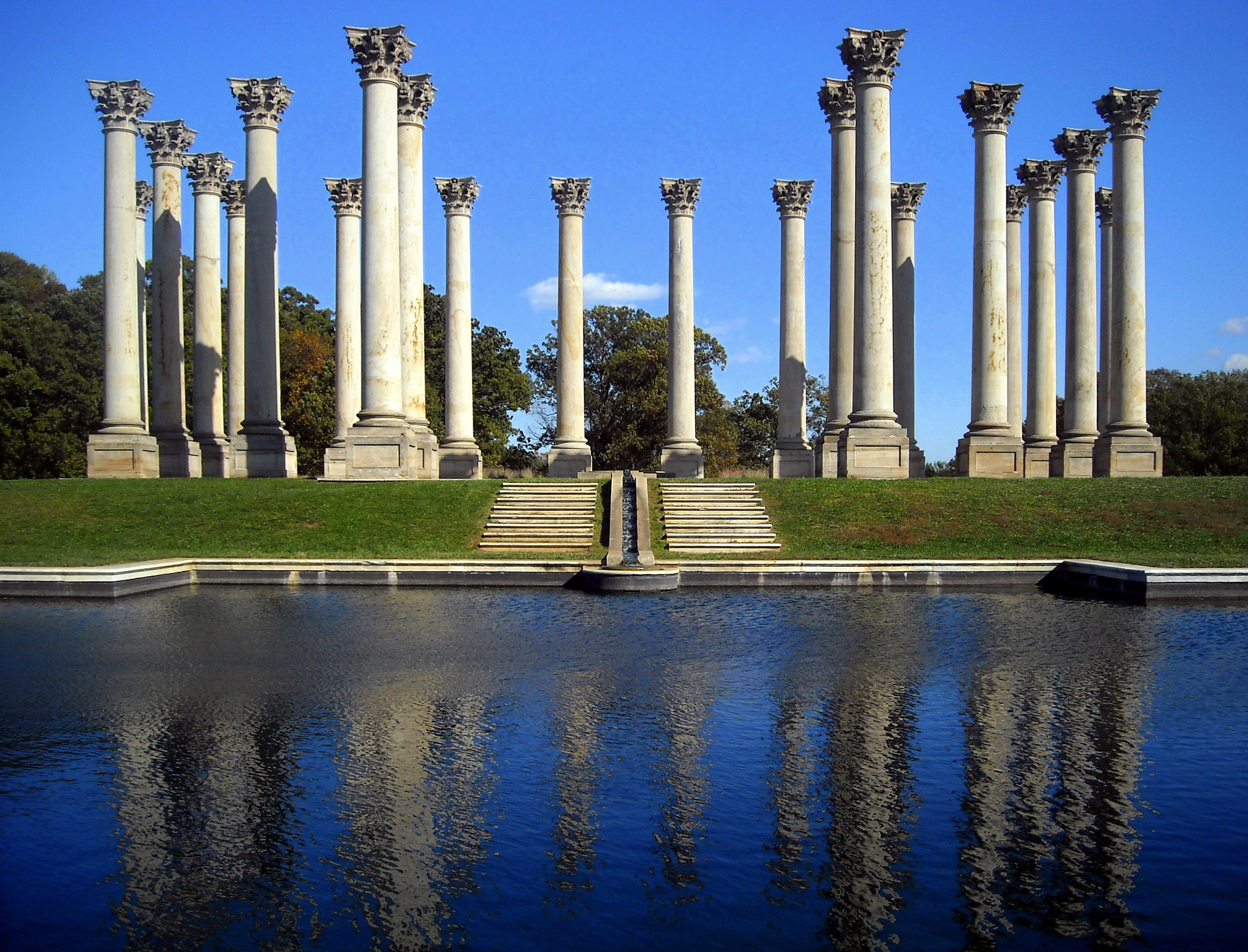
National Capitol Columns at the United States National Arboretum in Washington, D.C.

United States National Arboretum, US

In 1927, the United States National Arboretum was established in Washington, D.C., on 440 acres (180 ha) of land; currently it receives over half a million annual visitors. Single-genus groupings include apples, azaleas, boxwoods, dogwoods, hollies, magnolias and maples. Other major garden features include collections of herbaceous and aquatic plants, the National Bonsai and Penjing Museum, the Asian Collections, the Conifer Collections, native plant collections, the National Herb Garden and the National Grove of State Trees. A unique feature of the U.S. National Arboretum is the National Capitol Columns, 23 Corinthian columns that were used in the United States Capitol from 1828 until 1958.

University of Wisconsin Arboretum, US

The University of Wisconsin–Madison Arboretum in Madison, Wisconsin is a study collection devoted to ecology rather than systematics. Founded in the 1930s, it was a Civilian Conservation Corps project which restored a body of land to its presettlement state. Portions of the Walt Disney nature documentary, "The Vanishing Prairie", were filmed there, notably the prairie fire, filmed during a controlled burn at the Arboretum.

Utah State University, Logan Campus, US

With over 30 of the largest tree species in Utah and over 7,000 specimens, Utah State University's Logan campus (main campus) is recognized as an international arboretum through the ArbNet arboretum accreditation program.

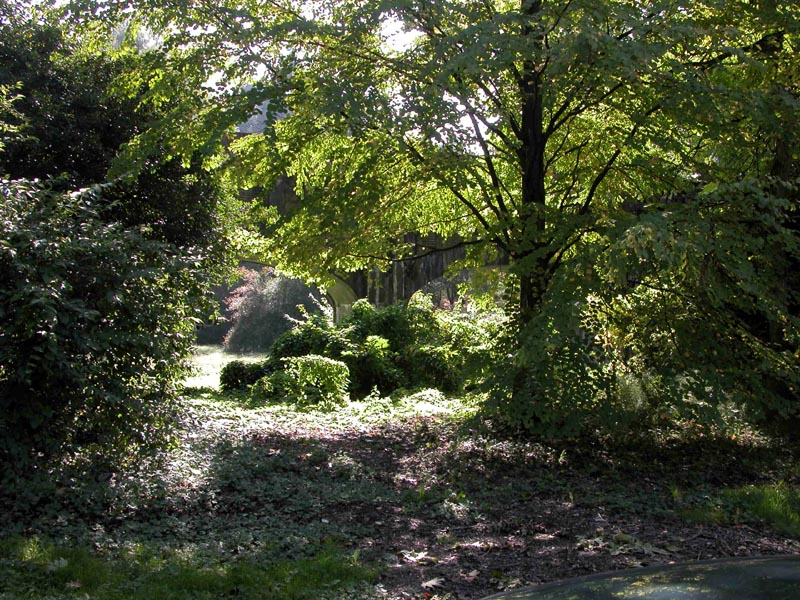
The 1911 Lynn Street Aqueduct in the Washington Park Arboretum in Seattle

Washington Park Arboretum, Washington, US

The Washington Park Arboretum at the University of Washington in Seattle, Washington, was established in 1934 as a public space that was agreed upon by the University of Washington and the City of Seattle. Seattle at the time had in its possession an over-1,200-acre (500+ ha) park known as Washington park located in the central portion of the city, and the university was given authority to design, construct, plant, and manage an arboretum and botanical garden in this park. It has been a popular destination of Seattlites ever since. In 2005, the Washington Park Arboretum, as well as the University of Washington's Center for Urban Horticulture, Elisabeth C. Miller Library, Otis Hyde Herbarium and Union Bay Natural Area, began operating under the umbrella of the University of Washington Botanic Gardens.

Boyce Thompson Arboretum, Superior, Arizona

Located in the historic copper mining town of Superior, Arizona, 55 miles east of Phoenix.

Viveros de Coyoacán, Mexico City, Mexico

Viveros de Coyoacán is a 38.9-hectare arboretum and park in the Coyoacán borough of Mexico City that was built in 1901 and opened to the public in the 1930s.

Scott Arboretum of Swarthmore College, Pennsylvania

The Scott Arboretum of Swarthmore College was established as the Arthur Hoyt Scott Horticultural Foundation in 1929, and has since grown to include the James R. Frorer Holly Collection, which contains over 350 types of holly, the Dean Bond Rose Garden, which contains over 200 types of roses, an extensive pinetum, and the woodland and walking trails of Crum Woods. The arboretum's tree peony collection "has historic depth in tree peonies from Japan and China as well as classic selections from European and American tree peony breeders. In 1940 the Scott Arboretum listed 280 cultivars." Partnering with the University of Michigan's Nichols Arboretum, the Scott Arboretum established "a multi-institution collaborative to conserve the range of peony species and cultivars that can grow in Canada and the United States."

Morris Arboretum of University of Pennsylvania, Pennsylvania

The Morris Arboretum of the University of Pennsylvania is the official arboretum of the Commonwealth of Pennsylvania. It is located in the Chestnut Hill neighborhood of Philadelphia, Pennsylvania. Built in 1889, the arboretum was opened to the public in 1933. The arboretum contains more than 13,000 labelled plants of over 2,500 types and covers 175 acres.

Cowling Arboretum, US

The Cowling Arboretum (also referred to as the Arb) consists of approximately 880 acres (360 hectares) of land adjacent to Carleton College. The Carleton Arboretum is located on a natural border between prairie and forest habitat. The arboretum serves as a Minnesota state game refuge. It was originally created in the 1920s. The arboretum is divided by Minnesota State Highway 19 into the Upper Arboretum (south of the highway) and the Lower Arboretum (north of the highway; "lower" because it contains the low-lying floodplain of the Cannon River).

== See also ==
- Botanical garden
- Esveld Aceretum
- Greenland Arboretum
- Horticulture
- Landscape architecture
- Landscaping
- List of botanical gardens and arboreta in the United States
- National Public Gardens Day
- PlantCollections
- Silviculture
- Tree planting
- Tree
- Wood
- Xylotheque
