= Lindsay Pryor National Arboretum =

Arboretum in Canberra, Australia

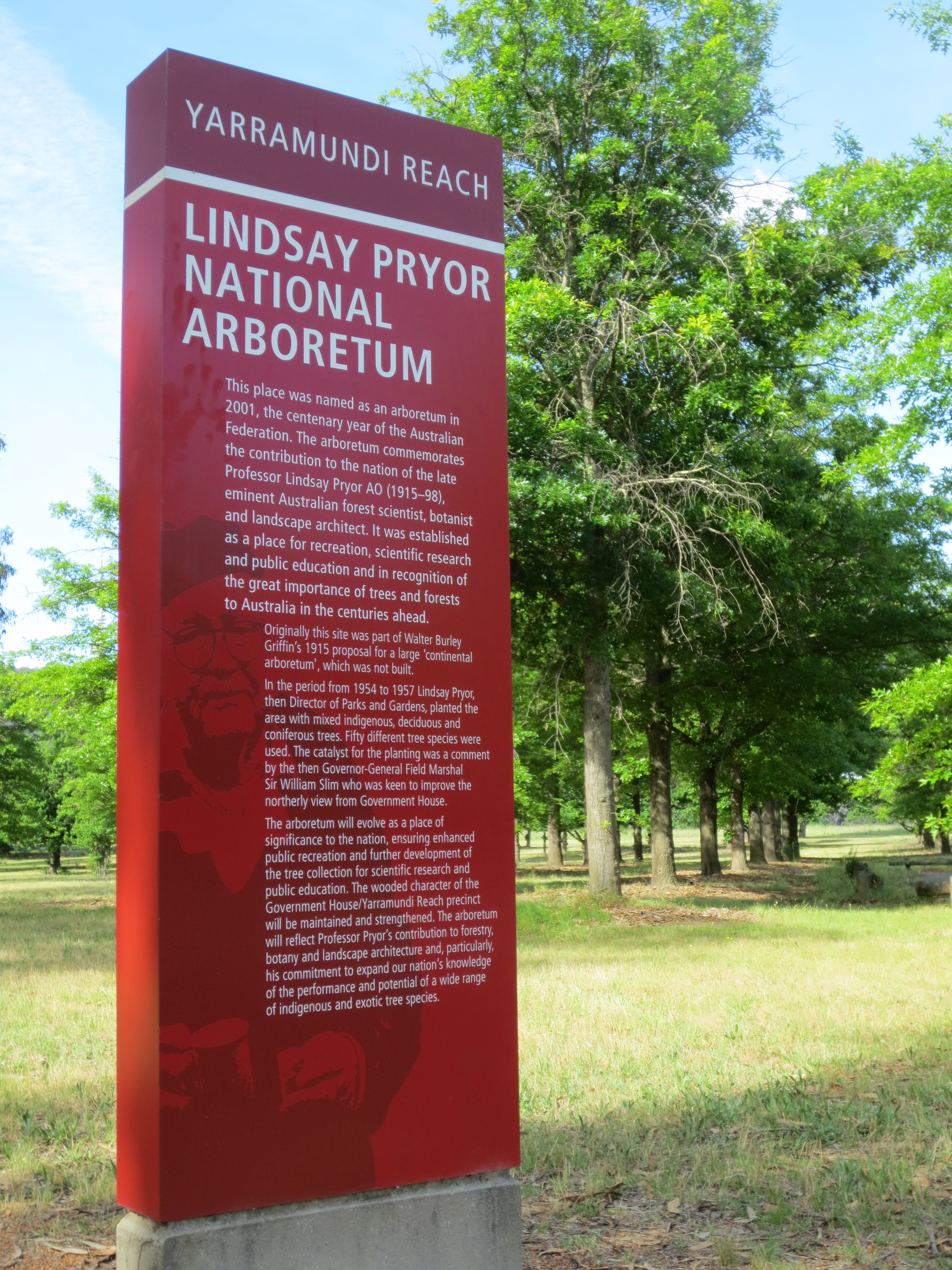
- Interactive map of Lindsay Pryor National Arboretum
- Type: Arboretum
- Location: Canberra
- Coordinates: 35.296°S 149.081°E
- Area: 26 hectares (64 acres)

The Lindsay Pryor National Arboretum is an arboretum on the Yarramundi Reach peninsula in Canberra, the capital of Australia. It is named after Lindsay Pryor, a noted Australian botanist. The site is located at the western end of Lake Burley Griffin and is used for research and recreation.

The arboretum covers 26 hectares, with around 55 tree species planted. It is located adjacent to, but separate from, the National Arboretum Canberra.

== History ==
The site was originally earmarked by Walter Burley Griffin, in his 1915 proposal for the design of Canberra, for a large arboretum containing plants from different continents. Based on the original proposals, the site would have contained plants from Africa.

Trees of the arboretum were mostly planted between 1954 and 1957 by Lindsay Pryor. This followed a request from Sir William Slim, then the Governor-General of Australia, for an improved view from Government House.

The arboretum has survived bushfires in 1976 and 1977, and sustained damage in the 2003 Canberra bushfires. In 2010, the National Capital Authority commenced upgrades to the arboretum, which included the planting of 36 deciduous pin oak trees at the arboretum entrance.

== Gallery ==
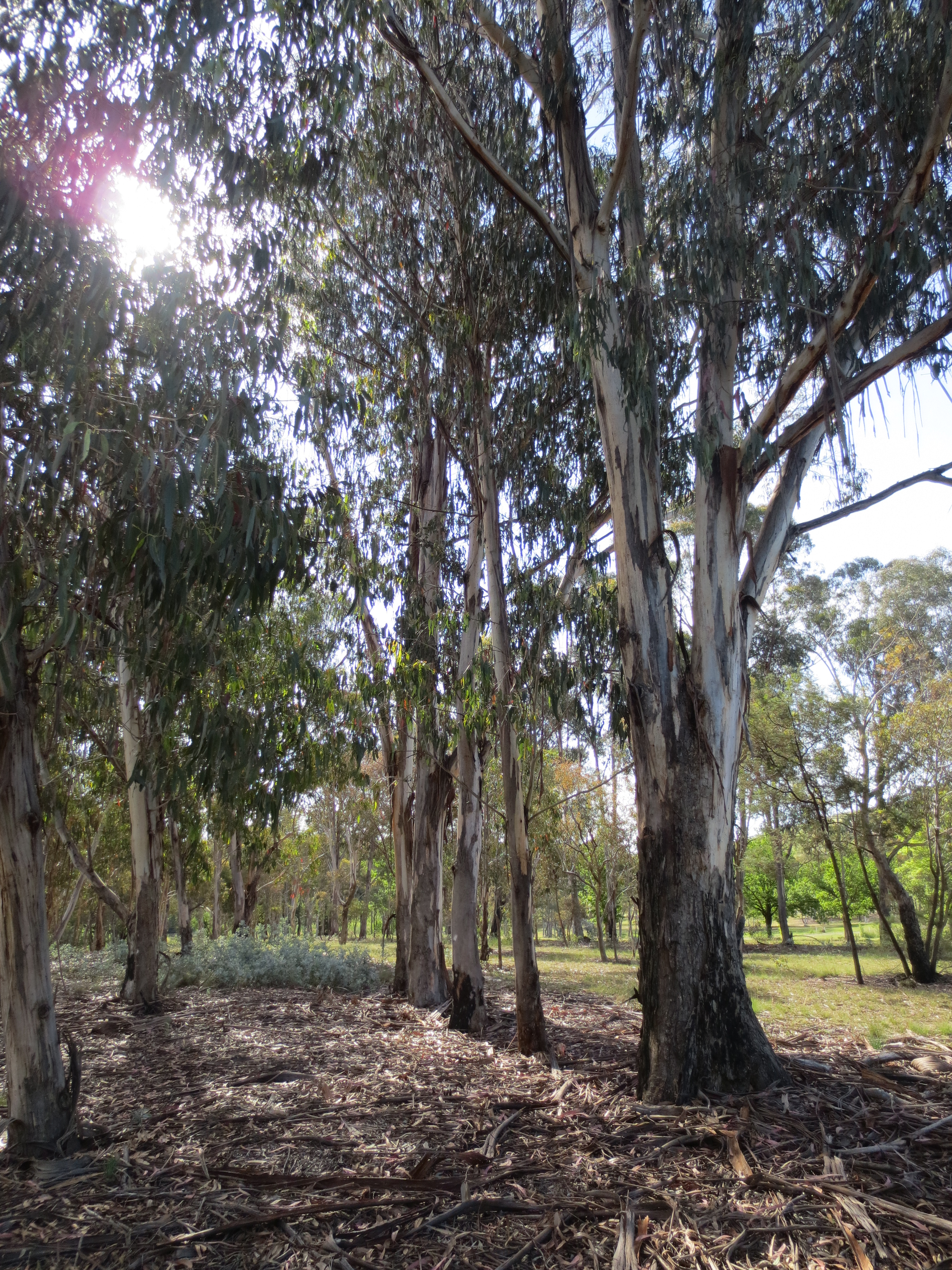
Eucalyptus Trees in the Lindsay Pryor National Arboretum

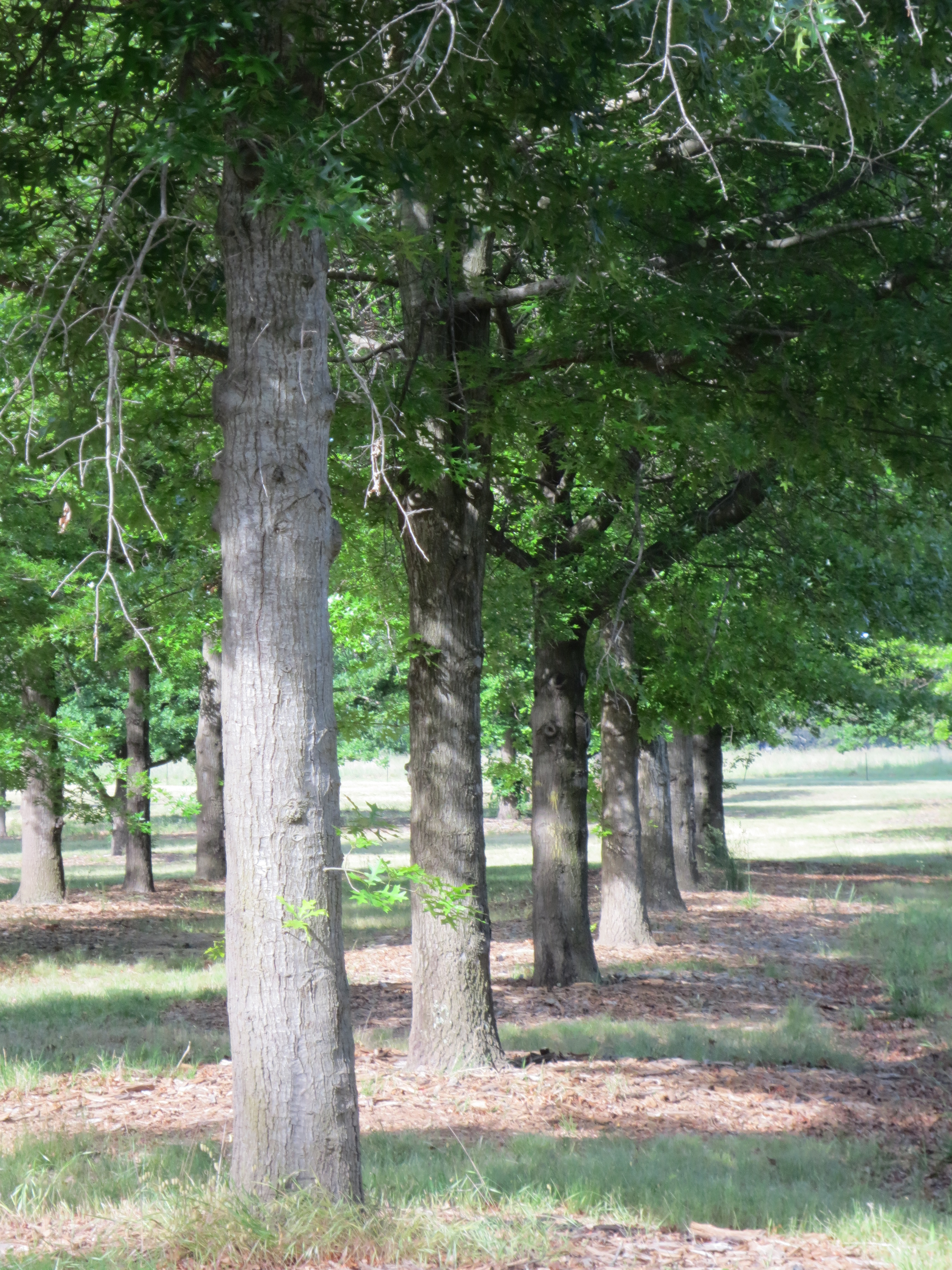
Trees in the Lindsay Pryor National Arboretum
