= Oswald Pryor =

Australian cartoonist (1881–1971)

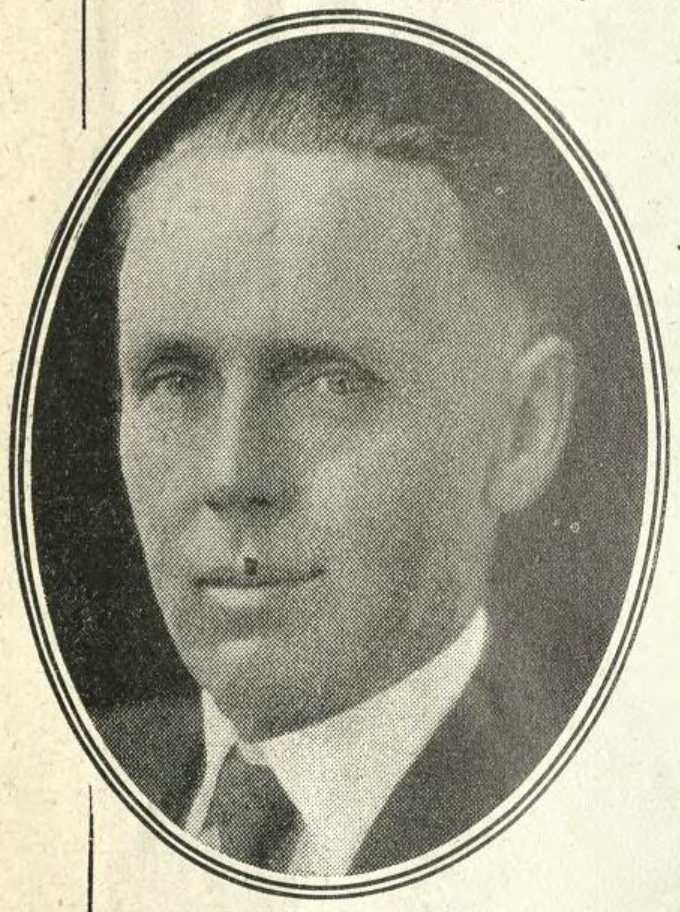
- Born: 15 February 1881; Moonta, South Australia
- Died: 13 June 1971 (aged 90); Queanbeyan, New South Wales, Australia
- Known for: Cartooning

Oswald Pryor (15 February 1881 – 13 June 1971) was a South Australian cartoonist noted for his depictions of life in the Copper Triangle, particularly of miners from Cornwall.

== History ==
Oswald was born the son of James Pryor (c. 1844 – 19 April 1917) and Caroline Jane Pryor, née Richards (c. 1846 – 20 August 1926), both of Cornish origin, at Moonta Mines. He began work in the mines at age 13 years, under Captain H. R. Hancock. He was surface manager from 1911 to a few months before the company went into liquidation in 1923.

His earliest work appeared in Quiz from 1901, and The Gadfly in 1907, both under the pseudonym "Cipher". Encouraged by C. J. Dennis, he began submitting his cartoons depicting Cornish miners to The Bulletin under his own name. He also contributed to the Weekly Herald, the Areas Express and Kapunda Herald.

He was a staff cartoonist for the (Adelaide) News from 1928 to 1935.

It was the general belief of the Tres, Pols and Pens who descended on the Moonta district about 100 years ago that they had gone there to mine copper and being conscientious fellows, mine copper they did, oblivious of the fact that their real function in life was to provide raw material for the cartoons of Oswald Pryor. W. E. Fitz Henry (1903–1957) in The Bulletin

Pryor died on 13 June 1971 at Queanbeyan, New South Wales.

== Family ==
Pryor married Mabel Dixon ( –1967) on 8 January 1908.

- Lindsay Dixon Pryor married Wilma Brahe Percival of Canberra on 8 October 1938. His promotion to Superintendent of Parks and Gardens, Department of the Interior in 1944 was criticised. He was in 1958 appointed Professor of Botany at Canberra University College, later part of the Australian National University. He was responsible establishing the Botanic Garden on Black Mountain and the Mount Gingera alpine park (later abandoned).
- Grandson Geoff Pryor was a cartoonist for the Canberra Times.

== Bibliography ==
- Pryor, Oswald. Cornish pasty : a selection of cartoons, Adelaide : Rigby, 1961 (collection of cartoons first published in The Bulletin)
- Pryor, Oswald. Australia's little Cornwall, Adelaide, S. Aust.: Rigby, 1962
- Pryor, Oswald. Cousin Jacks and Jennys, Adelaide : Rigby, 1966

A new edition of Cornish Pasty which included content from Cousin Jacks and Jennys was published in 1976 ISBN 0 7270 0084 5
