= Yarramundi Reach =

Peninsula in the Australian Capital Territory

Coordinates: 35°17′42″S 149°04′55″E

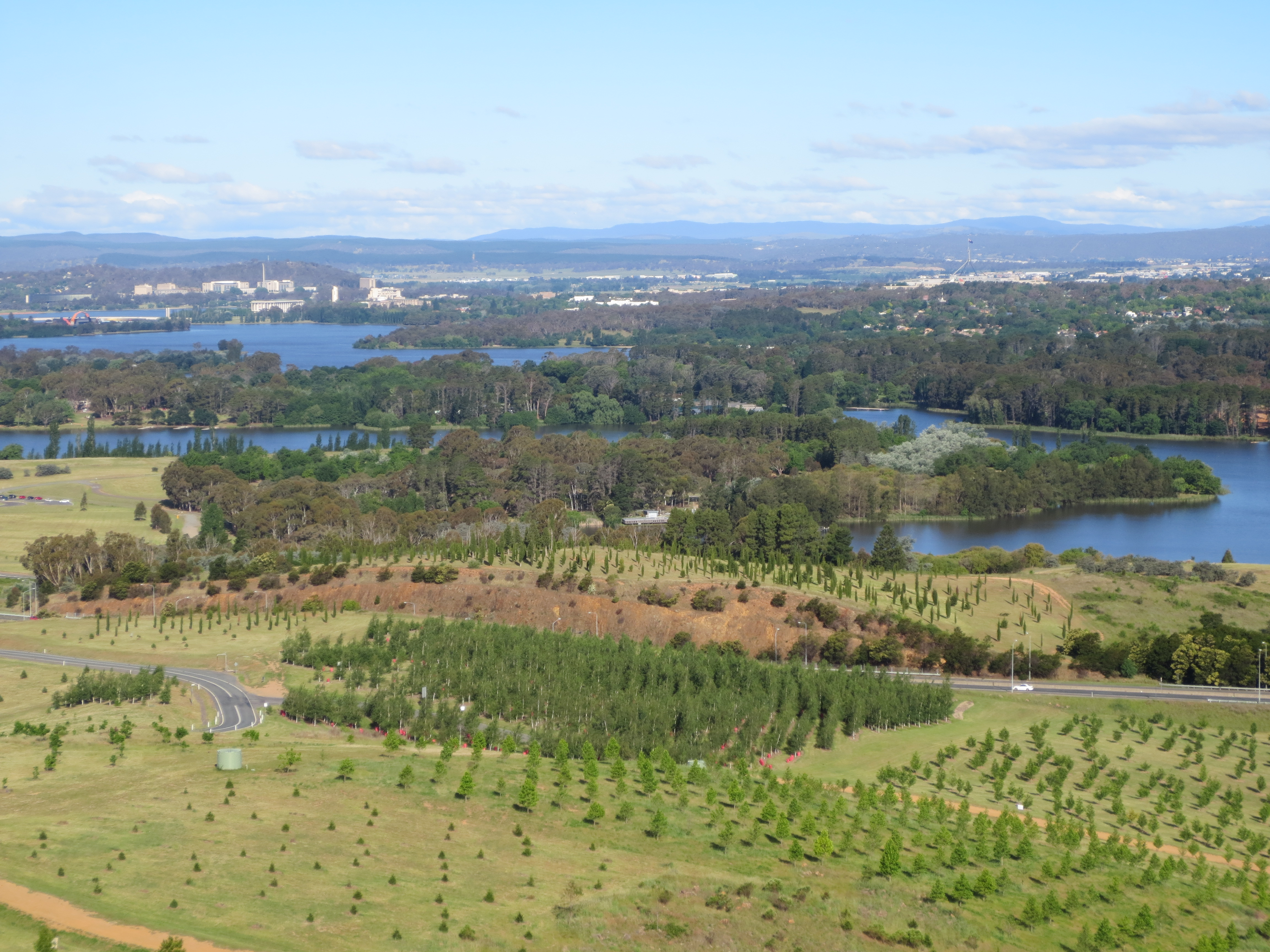
view of Yarramundi Reach with the National Arboretum Canberra in the foreground

Yarramundi Reach is a small peninsula on the western end of Lake Burley Griffin, in the Australian Capital Territory, close to Scrivener Dam. It is also the name for the area of water on Lake Burley Griffin between it and Weston Park.

The park on the peninsula has a picnic area and a public washroom, and access is provided off the nearby Tuggeranong Parkway. Lindsay Pryor National Arboretum is located on the peninsula as well. The peninsula is mainly grassland and woodland.

In 1993 the Keating government proposed Yarramundi Reach as the location for a National Museum of Australia. The new Liberal government in 1996 also said they would develop a museum at Yarramundi Reach; however, it was changed later in the year to Acton Peninsula, where the National Museum of Australia is now located.

== Gallery ==
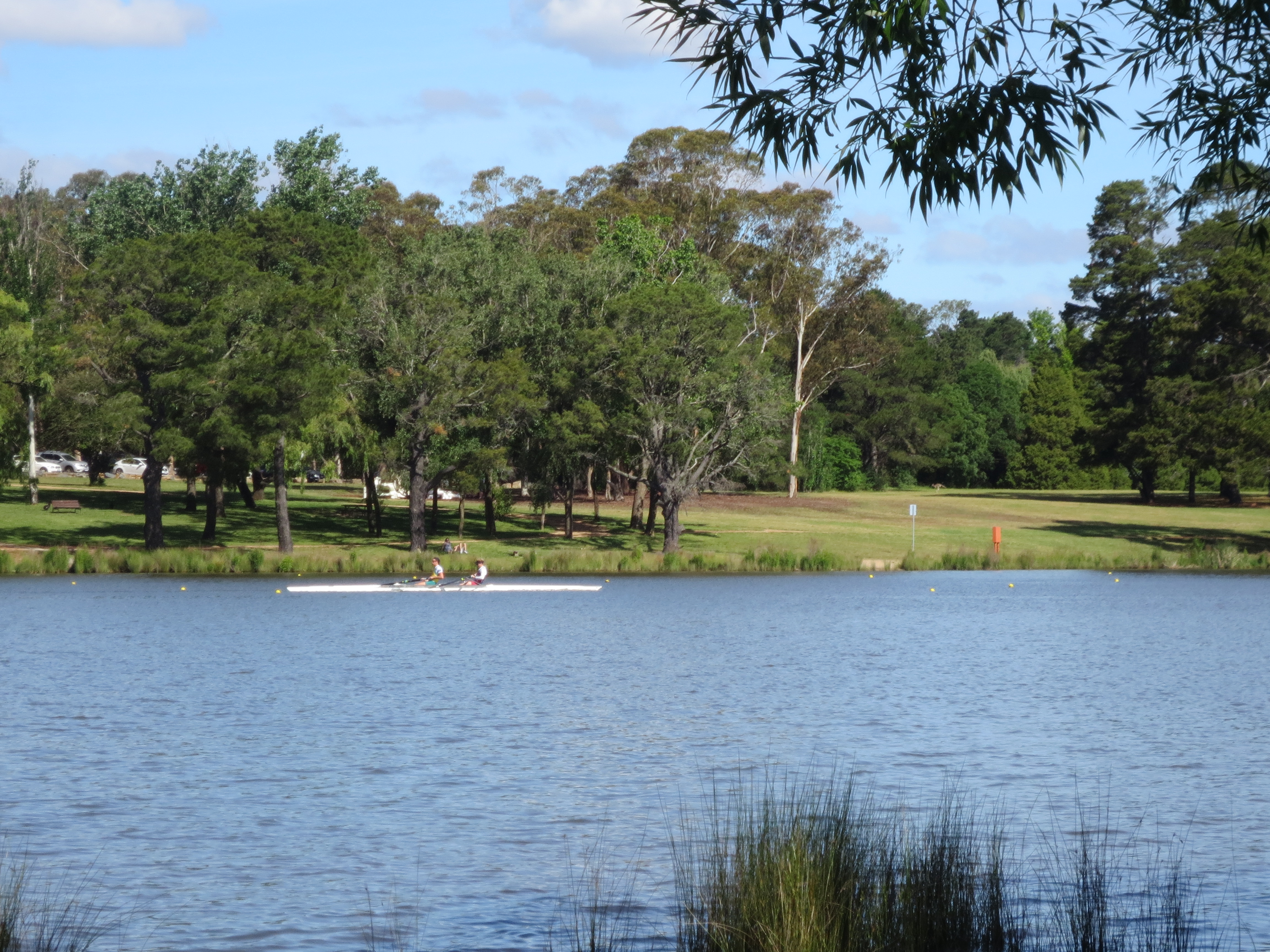
looking across Yarramundi Reach waters to Weston Park Canberra

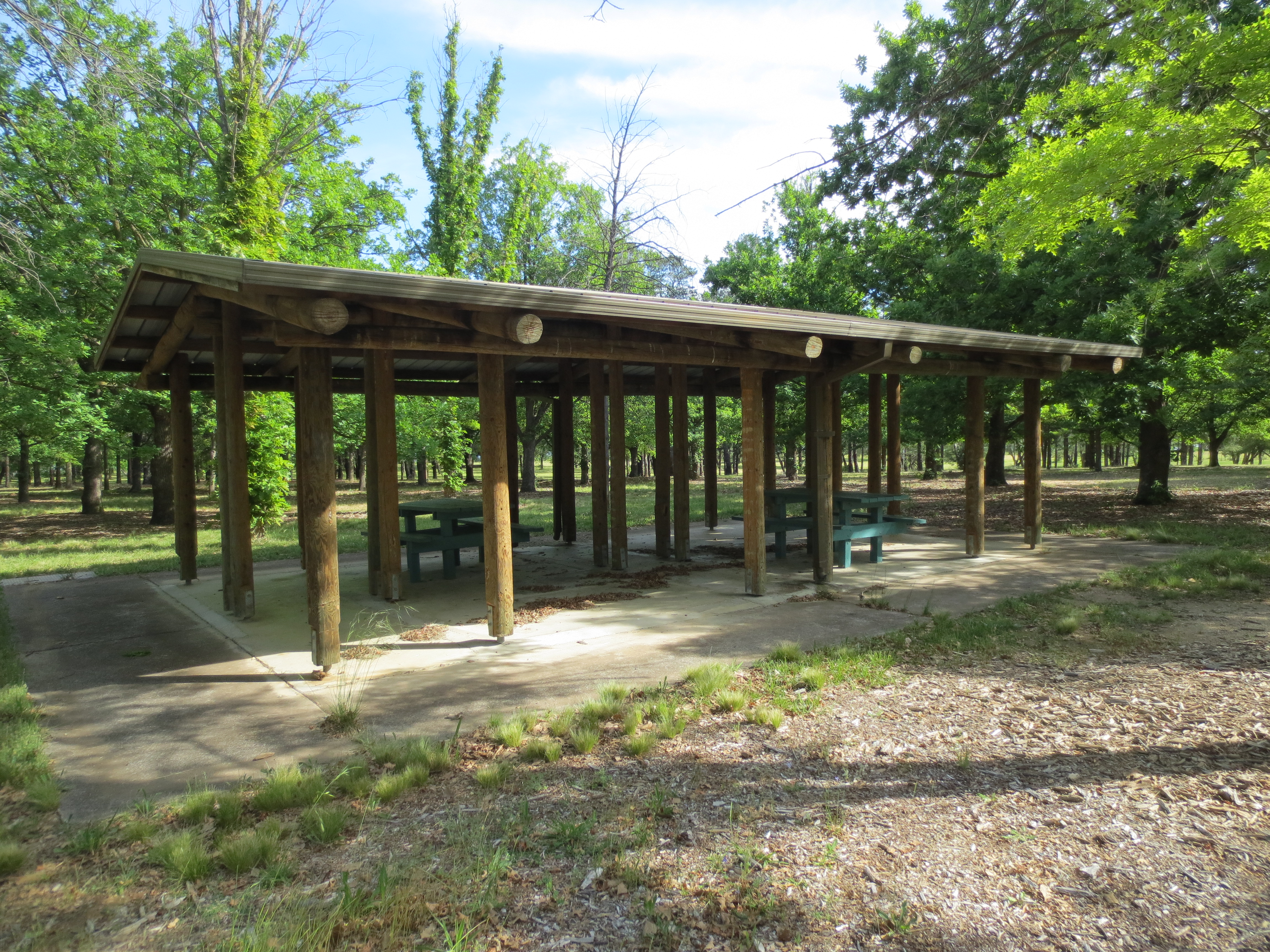
Picnic shelter at Yarramundi Reach
