= Lindsay Pryor =

Lindsay Dixon Pryor AO (26 October 1915 – 17 August 1998) was an Australian botanist noted for his work on Eucalyptus taxonomy and his role in the landscape design of Canberra, including the foundation of the Australian National Botanic Gardens.

== Overview ==
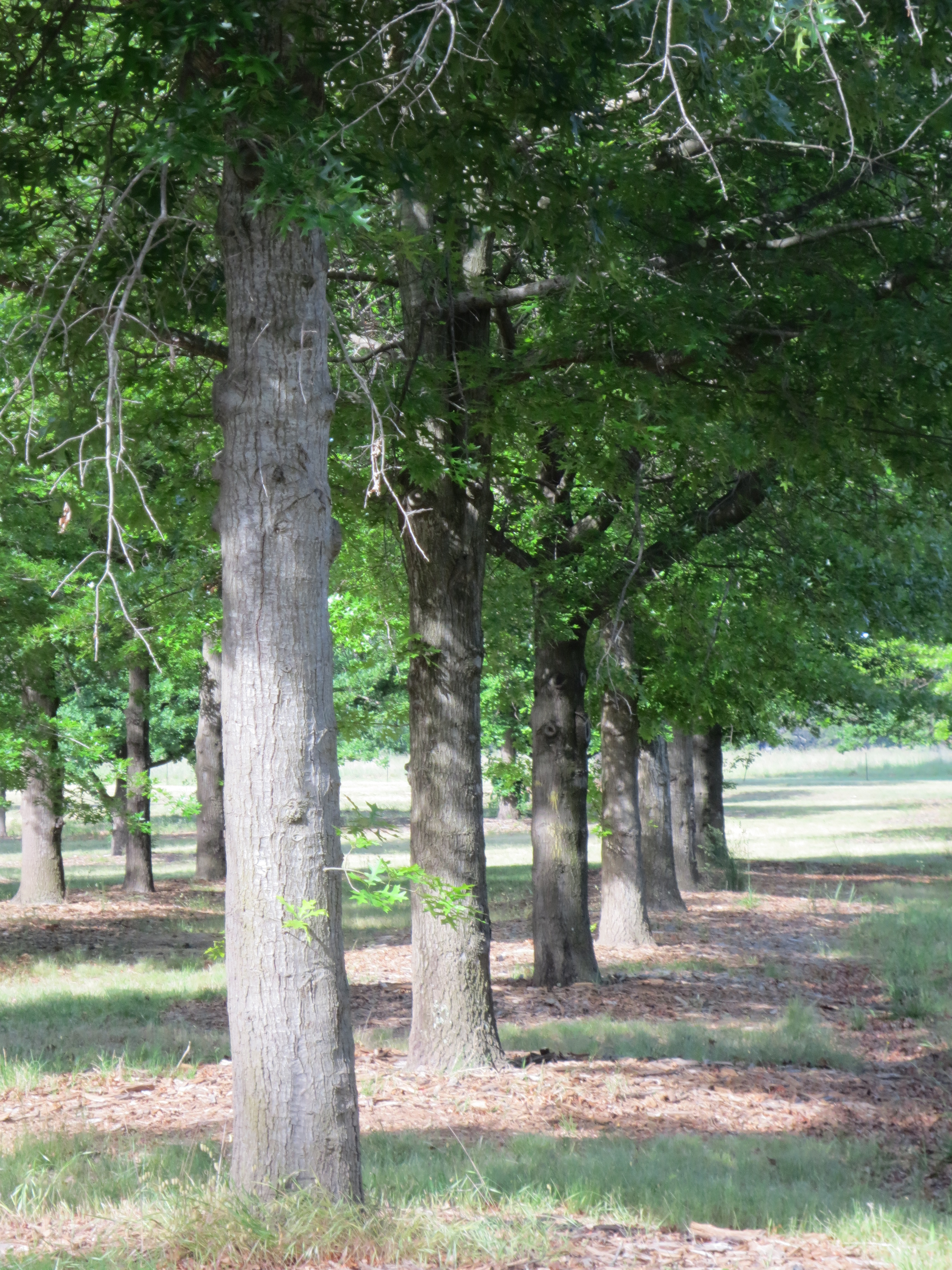
Trees at the Lindsay Pryor National Arboretum

Pryor was born in Moonta, South Australia; he attended Norwood High and the University of Adelaide and later went on to study at the Australian Forestry School in Canberra. His father, the cartoonist Oswald Pryor, encouraged him to pursue a career in forestry, and Pryor is said to have wanted to become a forester from age 12. He graduated BSc in 1935 and was awarded a Diploma of Forestry in 1936. In 1936 he was appointed ACT Assistant Forester, he worked under Charles Lane Poole. In this position he surveyed the native vegetation of the ACT and in 1939 received his master's degree in Science from Adelaide University for this work. He married in 1938, and he and his wife Wilma Pryor had four children – Elizabeth, Anthony, Geoffrey and Helen.

In 1939, Pryor was promoted to Assistant Research Officer in the Forestry and Timber Bureau and then to Acting Forester in 1940. He served as the ACT's forester until he was appointed the Director of Parks and Gardens in 1944. He carried on the work of Charles Weston, choosing and propagating native and exotic species to expand the range of vegetation in the growing city of Canberra. He continued development of the Yarralumla Nursery and worked on landscape design for the city; some of his many projects include Commonwealth, Griffith and Telopea Parks, Westbourne Woods and the grounds of the Australian National University. Between 1945 and 1958 he was involved in planning and establishing the Australian National Botanic Gardens, including the main gardens in Acton and at the Annexe at Jervis Bay and an Alpine Annexe at Mount Gingera, which has since been abandoned.

During his time as Director of Parks and Gardens he also initiated his own research on Eucalyptus. Papers he published on the subject to 1958 were submitted to the University of Adelaide and he was awarded his Doctor of Science for his work on Genetics in Eucalyptus taxonomy in June 1958. His 1971 book, A Classification of the Eucalyptus, written with Lawrie Johnson was an important contribution to Eucalyptus taxonomy.

On 1 January 1958, Pryor became a Professor when he was appointed to the Foundation Chair of the Botany Department at the Canberra University College. He moved to the Australian National University when UCU was incorporated with the School of General Studies of the ANU. On 30 September 1960, he became the first of the appointments to Chairs in Physics, Chemistry, Botany, Zoology and Geology at the ANU. During his time at the university he traveled widely and advised more than 20 countries on forestry though the United Nations' Food and Agriculture Organization, he also advised Australian governments and manufacturers. He retired in 1976, but he remained at ANU in several honorary roles until 1990.

In 1976 he was awarded the Mueller Medal by the Australian and New Zealand Association for the Advancement of Science.

He was a member of the first Advisory Committee for the Australian National Botanic Gardens in the 1980s, and in 1983 was made an Officer of the Order of Australia for his contributions to botany. He was also a Fellow of the Australian Institute of Landscape Architects, the Australian Academy of Technological Sciences and Engineering, and the Institute of Foresters of Australia, and a Member of the IUCN Commission on Ecology.

In 1995 the Friends of the ANBG unveiled a plaque in his honour beneath a Eucalyptus pryoriana tree. Posthumously he has been honored by the Government of the ACT; an arboretum named in his honour, the Lindsay Pryor National Arboretum, is planned to undergo significant extensions in 2007 and beyond. A large collection of oral history created by Pryor is held at the National Library of Australia. His contributions to the development of Canberra have been fully detailed in the 'A Pryor commitment: Canberra's public landscape 1944–1958', an MSc thesis by Bernadette Hince.

== Works ==
- Trees in Canberra, 1962, OCLC 6185778
- A classification of the eucalypts with L. A. S. Johnson, 1971, ISBN 0-7081-0563-7
- The biology of eucalypts, 1976, ISBN 0-7131-2542-X
- Australian endangered species: Eucalypts with J.D. Briggs, 1981, ISBN 0-642-89679-8
- Growing & breeding poplar in Australia with R.R. Willing, 1982, ISBN 0-9592751-0-X
- Trees and shrubs in Canberra with J.C.G. Banks, 2nd edition, 2001, ISBN 1863151842
