= National Arboretum Canberra =

Arboretum in Canberra, Australia

Coordinates: 35°17′24″S 149°04′12″E

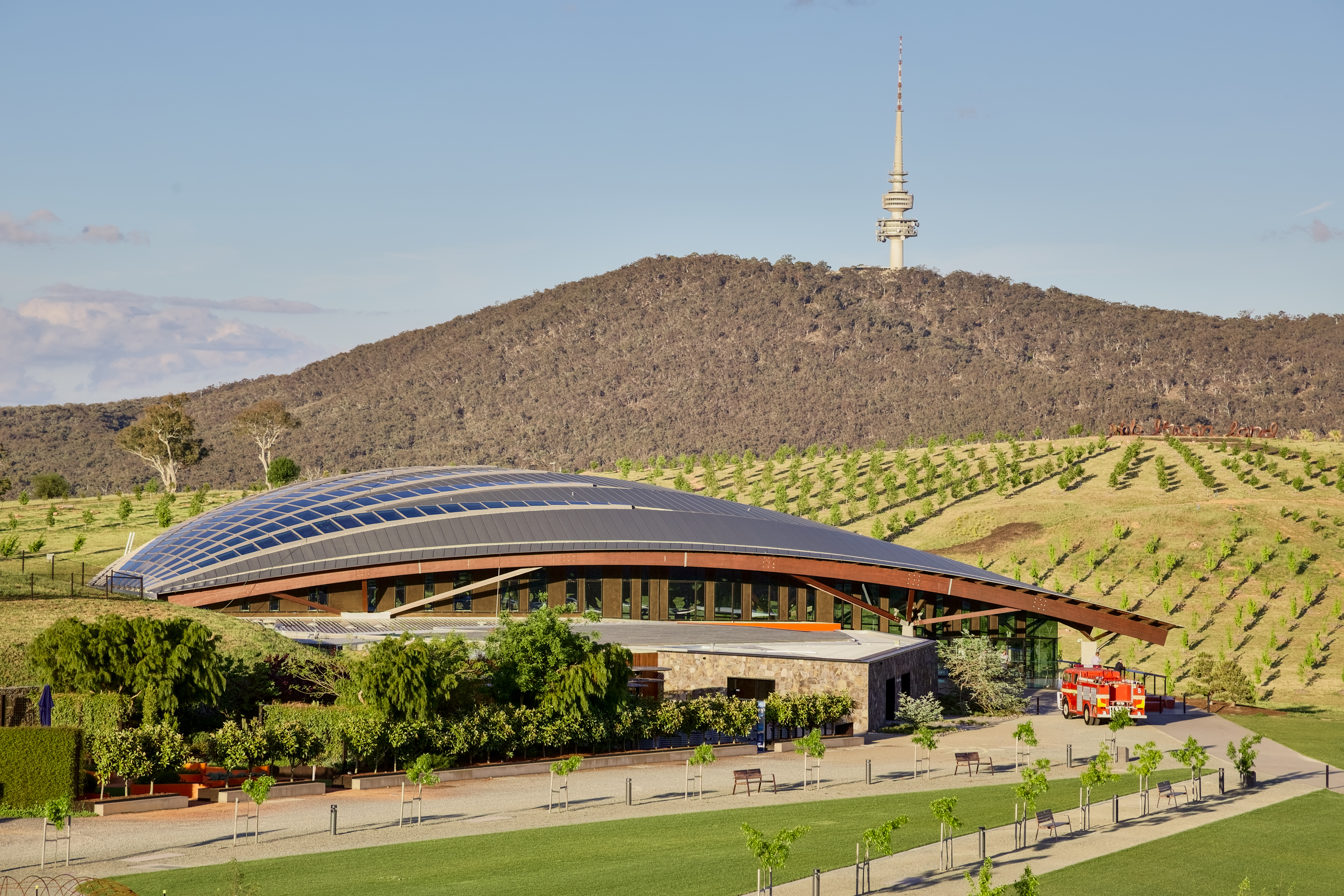
- Canberra National Arboretum (foreground) with Telstra Tower in the distance
- Interactive map of National Arboretum Canberra
- Type: Arboretum
- Location: Canberra
- Area: 250 hectares (620 acres)
- Opened: 1 February 2013
- Website: www.nationalarboretum.act.gov.au

The National Arboretum Canberra is a 250-hectare (620-acre) arboretum in Canberra, the national capital of Australia, created after the area was burned out as a result of the Christmas 2001 and 2003 Canberra bushfires: The Himalayan cedar forest lost about one third of its trees, and the commercial radiata pine plantation was burned out, allowing the arboretum to be created.

In 2004, the Government of the Australian Capital Territory held a nationwide competition for an arboretum, which was to be part of the recovery from the 2003 bushfires. The winning design by landscape architects Taylor Cullity Lethlean and architects Tonkin Zulaikha Greer proposed 100 forests and 100 gardens focussing on threatened, rare, and symbolic trees from around the world.

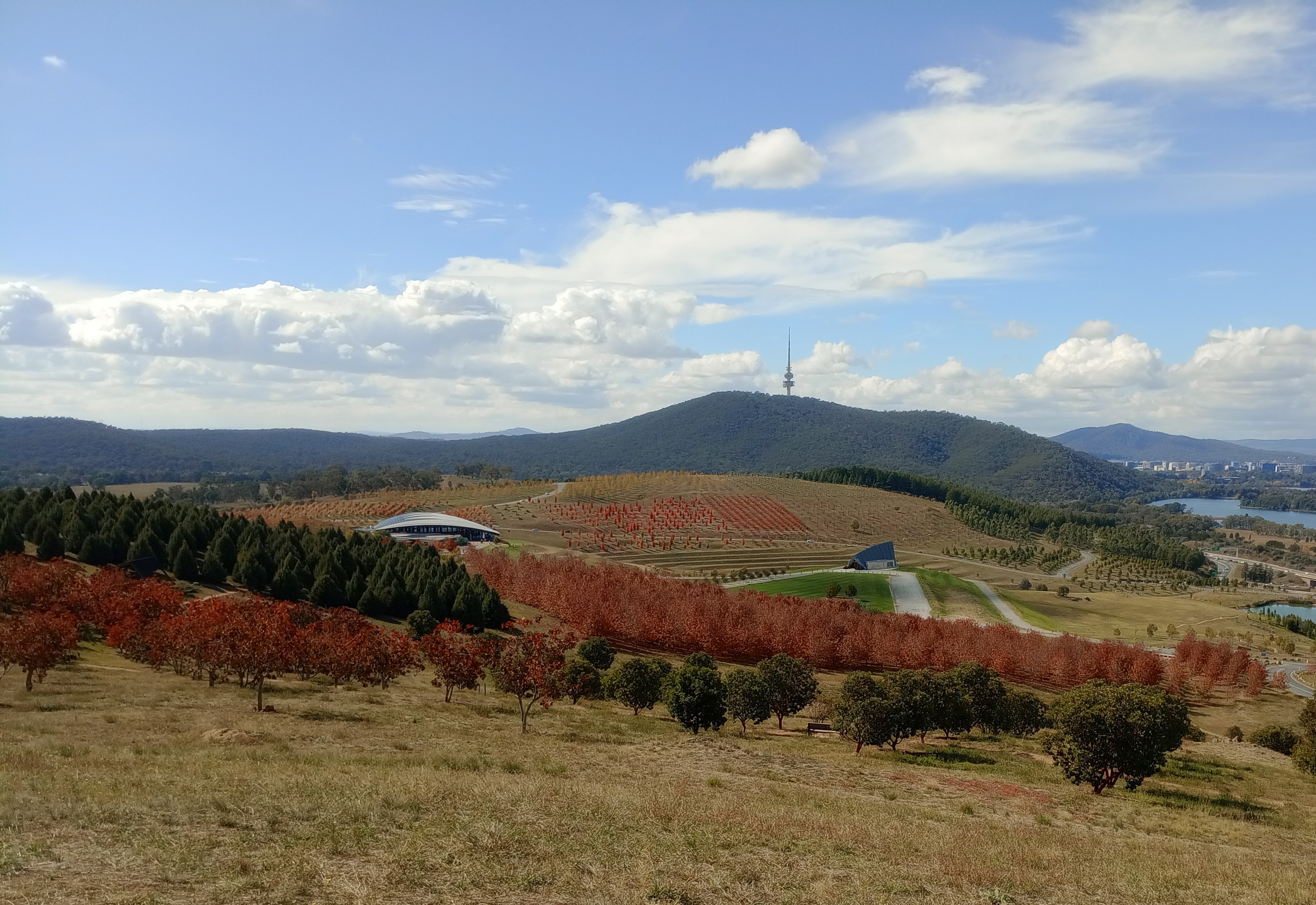
Autumn colours at the Arboretum, April 2025

The site has been planted since 2005, and includes ceremonial trees planted by visiting heads of government and ambassadors. It was officially opened on 1 February 2013.

== Plantings ==
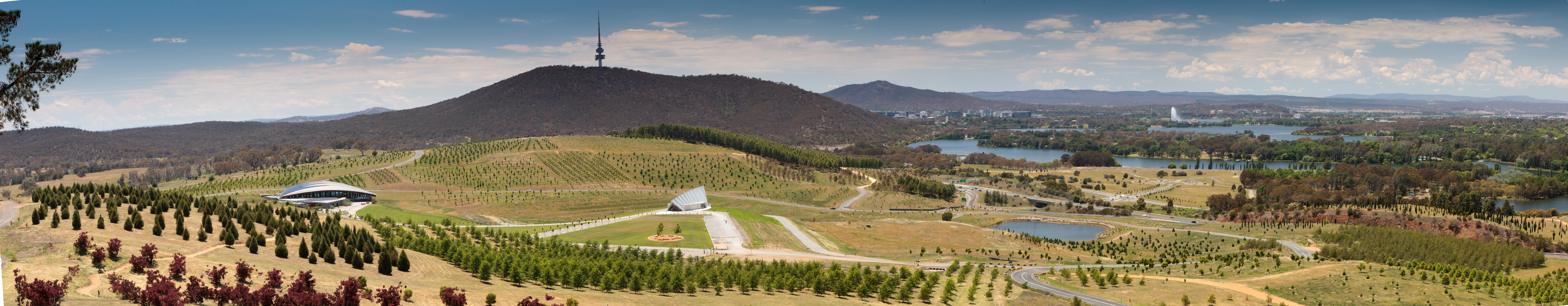
National Arboretum Canberra, looking east from Dairy Farmers Hill

Himalayan cedar (Cedrus deodara) grove, National Arboretum Canberra

The established areas include existing forests of Himalayan cedar (Cedrus deodara) and cork oak (Quercus suber) planted under the guidance of early town planners under general direction from the city's planner, Walter Burley Griffin. The arboretum is generally in keeping with Griffin's plan for such an arboretum, as expressed by the earlier forests.

A forest of Turkish pine Pinus brutia, a species native to the Gallipoli Peninsula in Turkey, has been planted to commemorate Australian service personnel killed in all conflicts. In addition, a number of ceremonial Aleppo pines (Pinus halepensis) have been planted on the summit of Dairy Farmers Hill, propagated from seed of the Lone Pine tree planted at the Australian War Memorial. These complement a number of mature specimens of this species already existing on the hill.

The National Bonsai and Penjing Collection of Australia, previously in Commonwealth Park, has been relocated to the arboretum.

Plantings include:

- California fan palm (Washingtonia filifera)
- Chinese tulip tree (Liriodendron chinense)
- Western old white gum (Eucalyptus argophloia)
- Yoshino cherry (Prunus x yedoensis)
- Dragon tree (Dracaena draco) – famously, 12 were stolen, of which some were recovered
- Maidenhair tree (Ginkgo biloba)
- Judas tree (Cercis siliquastrum)
- Giant redwood (Sequoiadendron giganteum)
- Camden white gum (Eucalyptus benthamii)
- Chinese rubber tree (Eucommia ulmoides)
- Horse chestnut (Aesculus hippocastanum)
- Monkey puzzle tree (Araucaria araucana)
- Bunya pine (Araucaria bidwillii)
- Weeping snow gum (Eucalyptus lacrimans)
- Wollemi pine (Wollemia nobilis)
- Illawarra flame tree (Brachychiton acerifolius)

=== Southern Tablelands Ecosystems Park ===
Close to the main building, the Village Centre, a eucalyptus forest representative of remnant and former forests of the Southern Tablelands region has been established with the long-term objective of creating a regional botanic garden, education and ecosystem recovery centre. It includes 16 eucalypt species from various habitats and a rich diversity of under-storey shrubs, grasses, ground covers, flowers and herbs providing natural habitat for a range of animals.

== Public areas and Buildings ==
The arboretum has some outstanding views and an open-air stage and amphitheatre. The buildings include the Village Centre, an innovative timber structure housing a cafe, restaurant, gift shop and interpretive exhibition, and a smaller event and ceremonial building called the Margaret Whitlam Pavilion. The stonework in the visitors center is sourced from the town of Wee Jasper, New South Wales, on the outskirts of Canberra.

== Public art ==
The arboretum features several pieces of monumental public art.

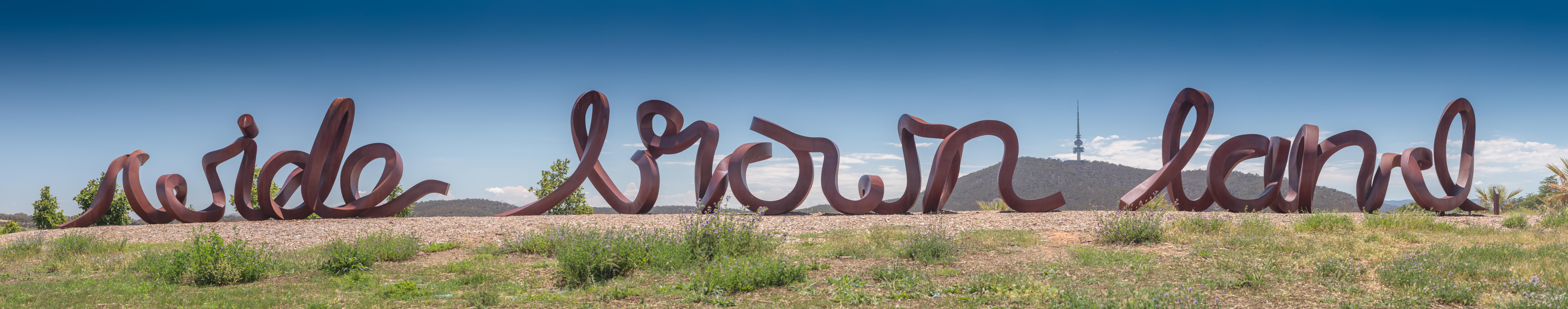
"wide brown land", spelling out the description of Australia by Dorothea McKellar in her poem My Country, based on McKellar's handwriting

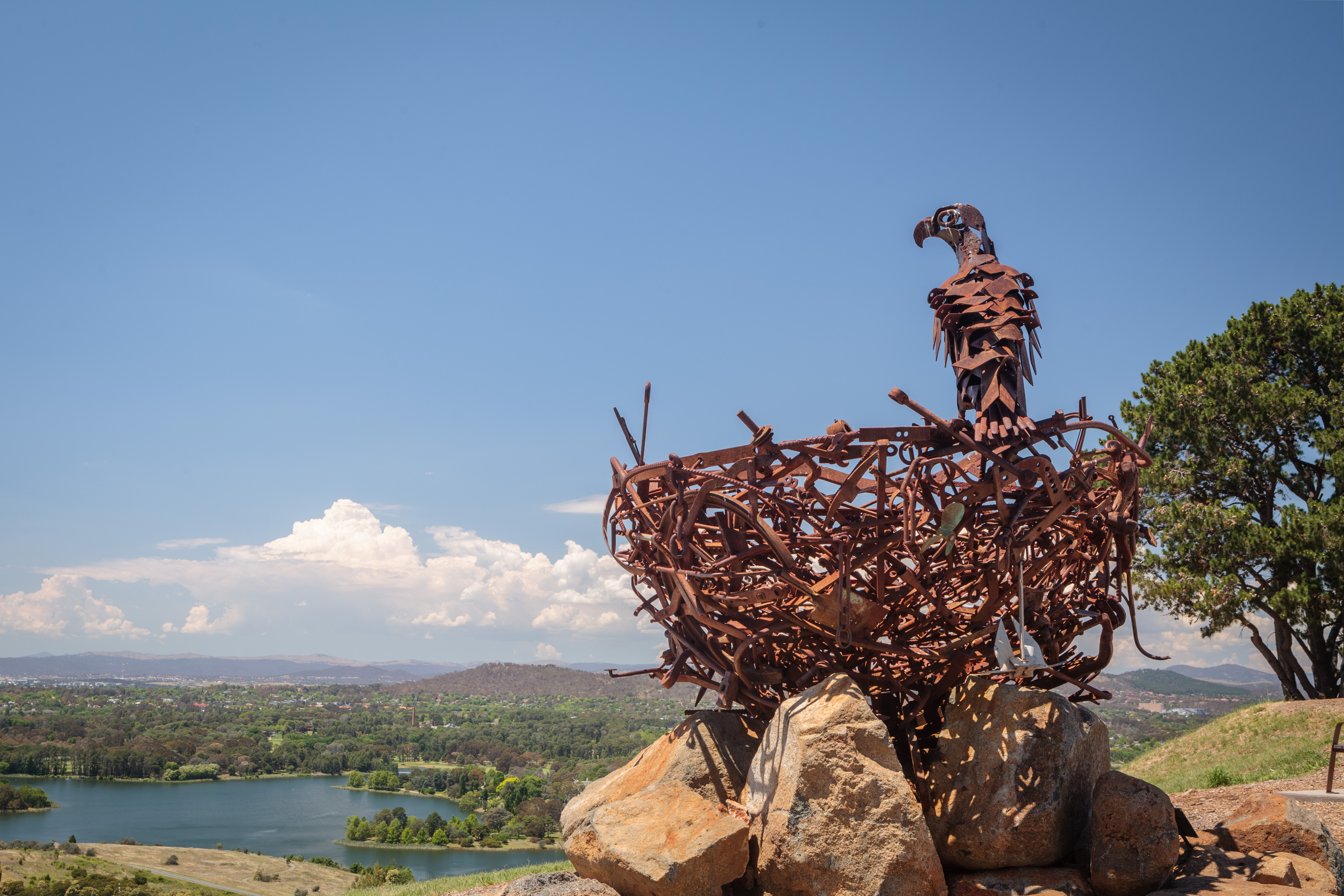
'Nest III' at the top of Dairy Farmers Hill

On a hill within and overlooking the arboretum is "wide brown land", spelling out the description of Australia by Dorothea McKellar in her poem My Country, taken from the original manuscript in McKellar's handwriting. It is approximately 35m in length and 3m tall.

On Dairy Farmers Hill is a found objects artwork depicting an eagle on a nest.

== See also ==
- Lindsay Pryor National Arboretum – nearby
- Arboretum Norr
