= Władysław Zamoyski =

Polish philanthropist

- Count
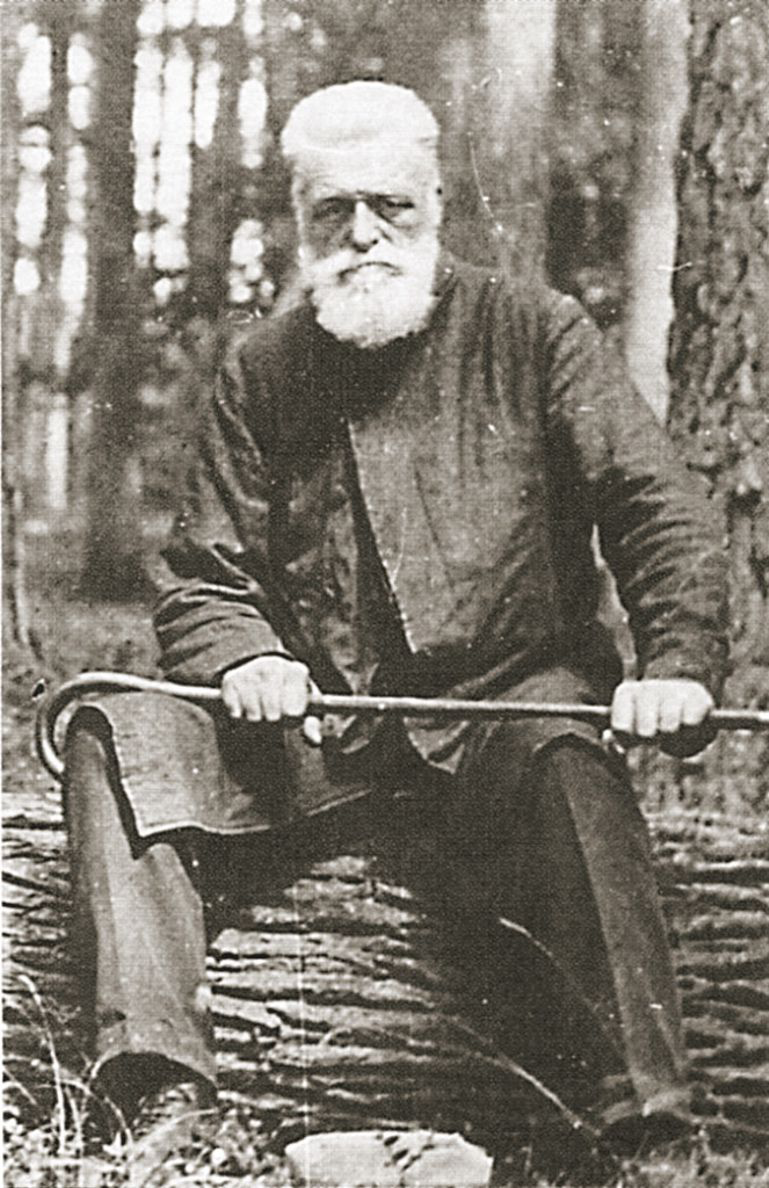
- Count Władysław Zamoyski in later life
- Coat of arms: Jelita
- Predecessor: Władysław Stanisław Zamoyski
- Born: 18 November 1853; Paris, France
- Died: 3 October 1924 (aged 70); Kórnik, Poland
- Noble family: Zamoyski
- Father: Władysław Stanisław Zamoyski
- Mother: Jadwiga Działyńska
- Occupation: diplomat, landowner, ecologist, philanthropist

Count Władysław Zamoyski (1853–1924) was a French-born Polish nobleman (szlachcic), diplomat and heir of Kórnik, Głuchów, Janusz, Babin and Bargów (estates in the Grand Duchy of Poznań). Having acquired estates on the Polish side of the Tatra Mountains and in Zakopane, he was an early ecologist and philanthropist. He was mentor to Józef Retinger, who was to become an international political activist during the two world wars and beyond, following the death of the latter's father.

== Early life ==
He was born in Paris the elder son of general Władysław Zamoyski, Crimean War veteran, and Jadwiga née Działyńska. He had one brother, Witold (1855–1874), and two sisters, Maria (1857–1858) who died in England and a further Maria Zamoyska (1860–1937). In 1871 he took the baccalauréat at the Lycée Charlemagne and between 1874 and 1878 made four attempts to gain entry to the École polytechnique. It is not certain that he succeeded as sources vary on the subject. He served in the French Army and rose to the rank of second lieutenant. As a representative of the French government, he travelled to Australia and Oceania to take part in exhibitions and brought back valuable ethnographical items.

== Activity in Poland ==
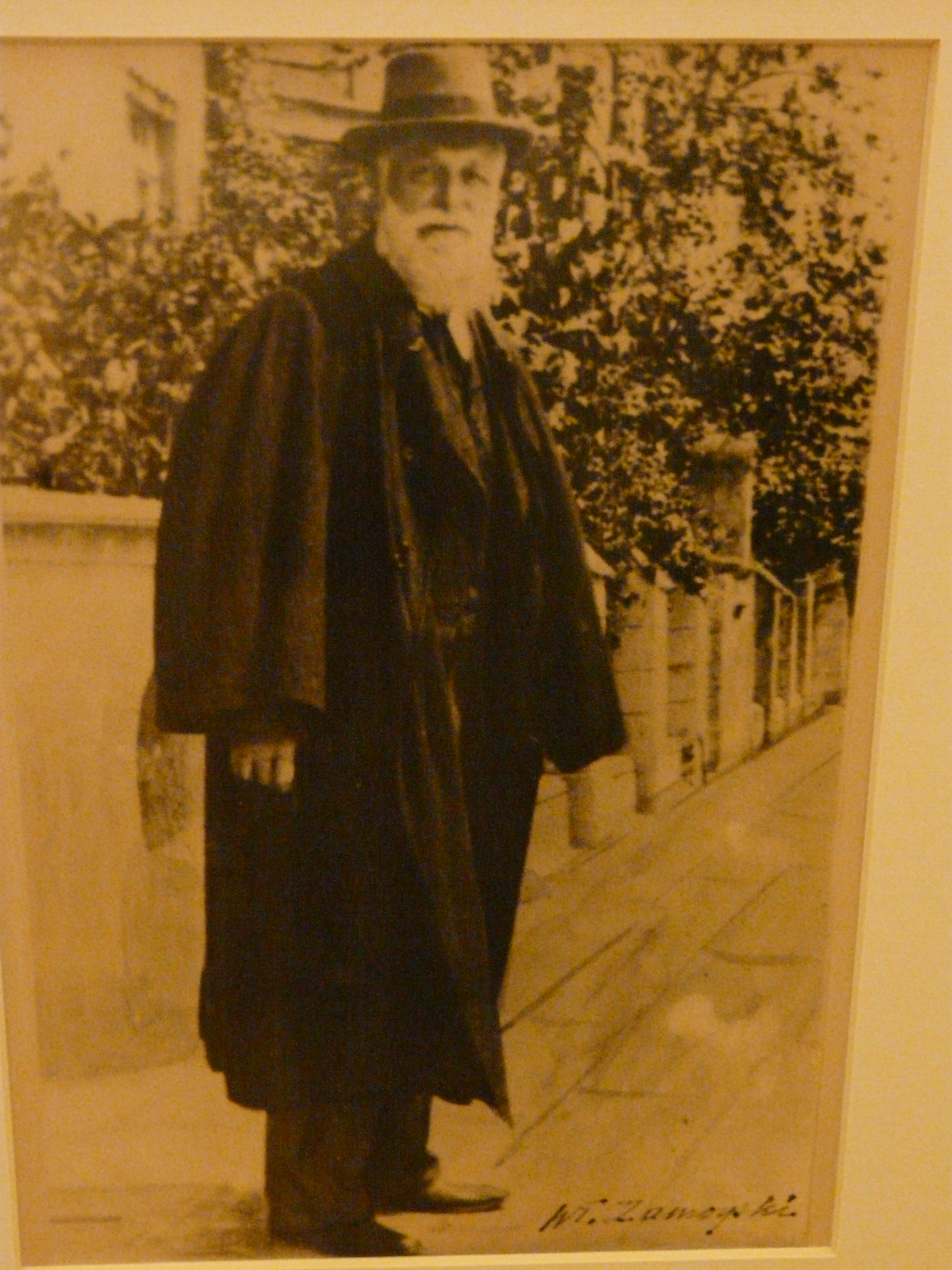
Zamoyski in Zakopane

Zamoyski moved to Poland when he inherited Kórnik (with the castle, library and arboretum) in Greater Poland, and other properties from his uncle, Jan Kanty Działyński in 1881. In 1885, as a French citizen, he was expelled from Kórnik by the Prussians and consequently moved to Zakopane in Galicia. There, he promoted the activity of the Poznań (mortgage) Bank. In 1889, concerned to save the Tatra forests, he bought at auction the Zakopane estates, beating by one cent, the bid of the timber and mining industrialist, Józef Goldfinger. With Andrzej Chramiec he succeeded in bringing the railway from Chabówka to Zakopane and building a Macadamised road link to the mountain resort.

He succeeded in winning a boundary dispute with Hungary at the International Tribunal in Graz over the ownership of Morskie Oko, the Tatran lake and the adjacent territory.

=== In France ===
He next travelled back to France where with his surviving sister, Maria, he founded several charitable and educational institutions for the Polish émigré population, notably, Opieka Polska. He was chairman of the Czci i Chleba charity and was a co-founder of the Polish Literary and Arts Society.

== Later years ==
He returned to Poland in 1920. Neither he nor his sister ever married. He left all his properties to the Polish nation in his will, and initiated the Polish Institute of Dendrology in Kórnik.

== Distinctions ==
- Officer's Cross Order of Polonia Restituta (13 July 1921)

- Grand Cross Order of Polonia Restituta (10 November 1933), posthumously by President Ignacy Mościcki).

== See also ==
- Republic of Zakopane

== Bibliography ==
- Stanisław Potocki, Władysław Zamoyski, in: Wielkopolski słownik biograficzny, Warszawa-Poznań 1981, PWN ISBN 83-01-02722-3
