= Wincenty Sleńdziński =

Polish-Lithuanian painter

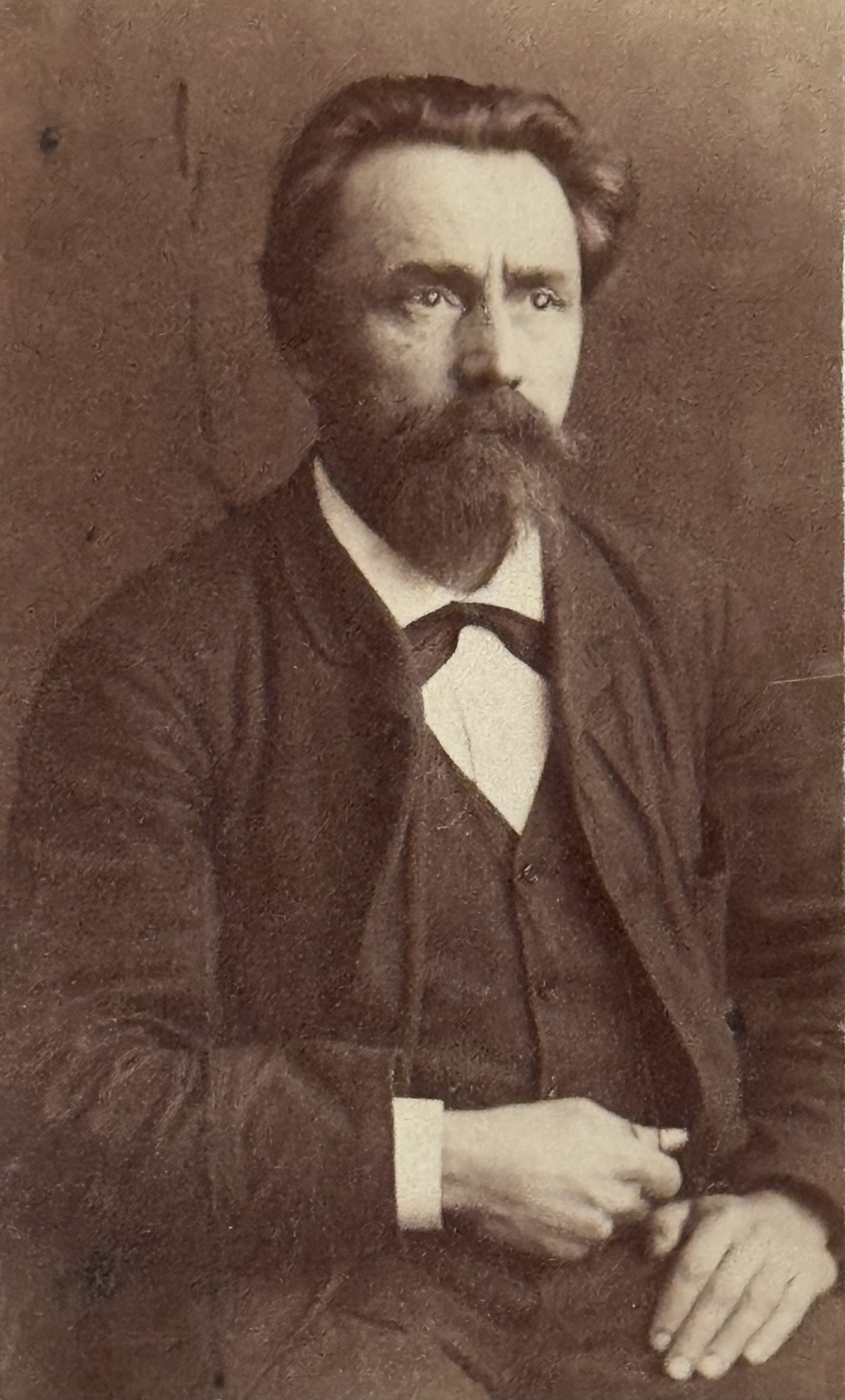
Portrait by Józef Czechowicz, 1885

Wincenty Leopold Sleńdziński, or Vincas Slendzinskis in Lithuanian (2 January 1838 – August 6, 1909) was a Polish-Lithuanian painter, primarily of portraits, in the Realist style.

== Biography ==
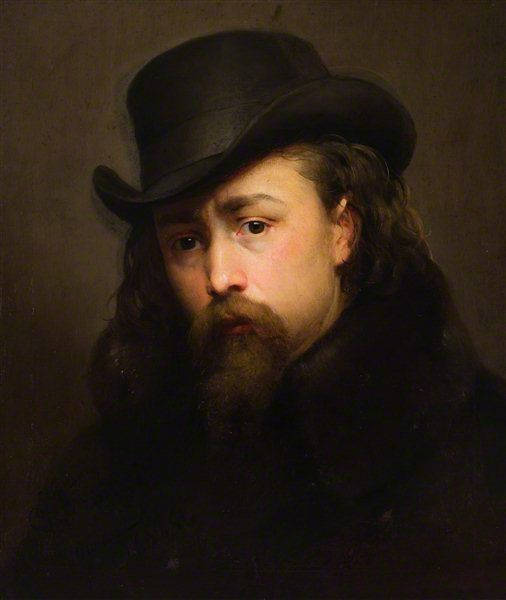
Self-portrait (1862)

He was born in Skrebinai, Jonava Raion. His first art lessons came from his father, the painter Aleksander Sleńdziński. Later, when the family moved to Vilnius, he received piano lessons from Stanisław Moniuszko. In exchange, his father gave drawing lessons to Moniuszko's daughter. His first formal painting instruction came from Kanuty Rusiecki.

In 1856, when admission to the Imperial Academy of Arts proved too difficult, he enrolled at the Moscow School of Painting, Sculpture and Architecture. Three years later, he was able to enter the Academy, where he was awarded a silver medal for his depiction of Daniel in the lions' den. In 1861, he received the title of "Artist", 3rd degree.

Shortly after, he joined a secret movement associated with the "Lithuanian Provincial Committee", an organization seeking independence for Lithuania. Following his participation in the January Uprising, he was arrested. After a short trial, he was sentenced to internal exile in Knyaginino, under strict police surveillance.

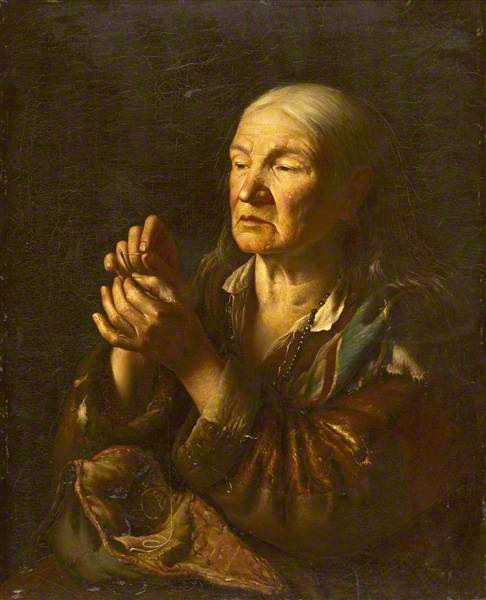
Grandmother Threading a Needle

In 1867, he was given permission to live in Kharkov, where he stayed until he was allowed to leave in 1872. He then went to Kraków, where he made the acquaintance of Jan Matejko. Later, he went to Dresden, where he lived with Józef Ignacy Kraszewski and his family. It was then that he first made a name for himself as a portrait painter. He also helped restore the paintings at Kórnik Castle. In 1875, after accidentally crossing the Austro-Hungarian border while hiking, he was ordered back to Kharkov.

In 1883, thanks to an Imperial amnesty, Sleńdziński was able to return to Vilnius and married the widow of a local photographer. Once again, in addition to his customary portraits, he engaged in restorative work. He also created religious frescoes at the Church of St. Casimir and several other notable churches, as well as the chapel of Rasos Cemetery.

His son, Ludomir Sleńdziński, also became a well-known painter and art professor. Sleńdziński died in 1909 in Vilnius.
