= Kórnik Arboretum =

Arboretum in Kórnik, Poland

Coordinates: 52°14′39″N 17°05′27″E

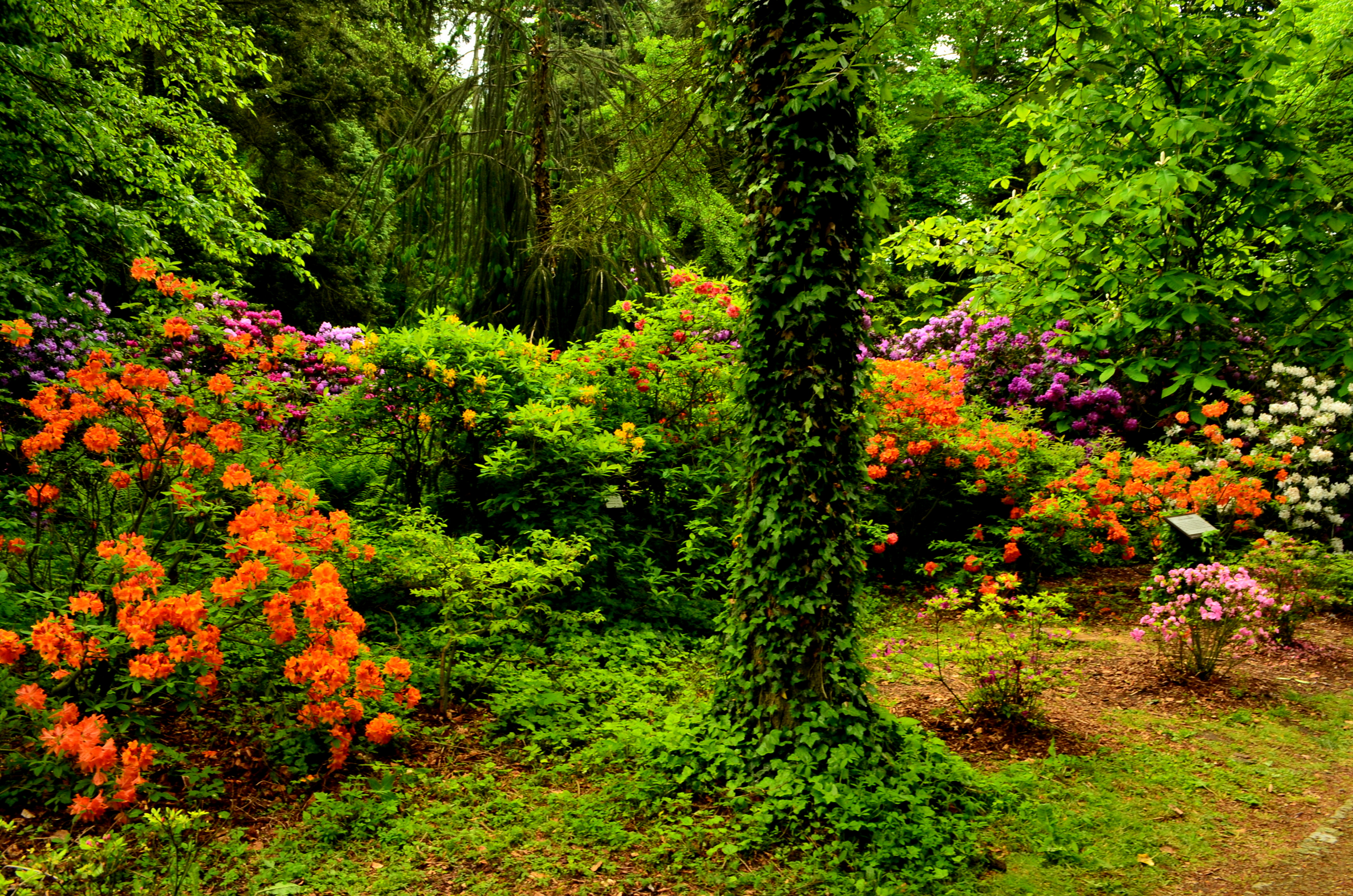
Rhododendrons in the Kórnik Arboretum

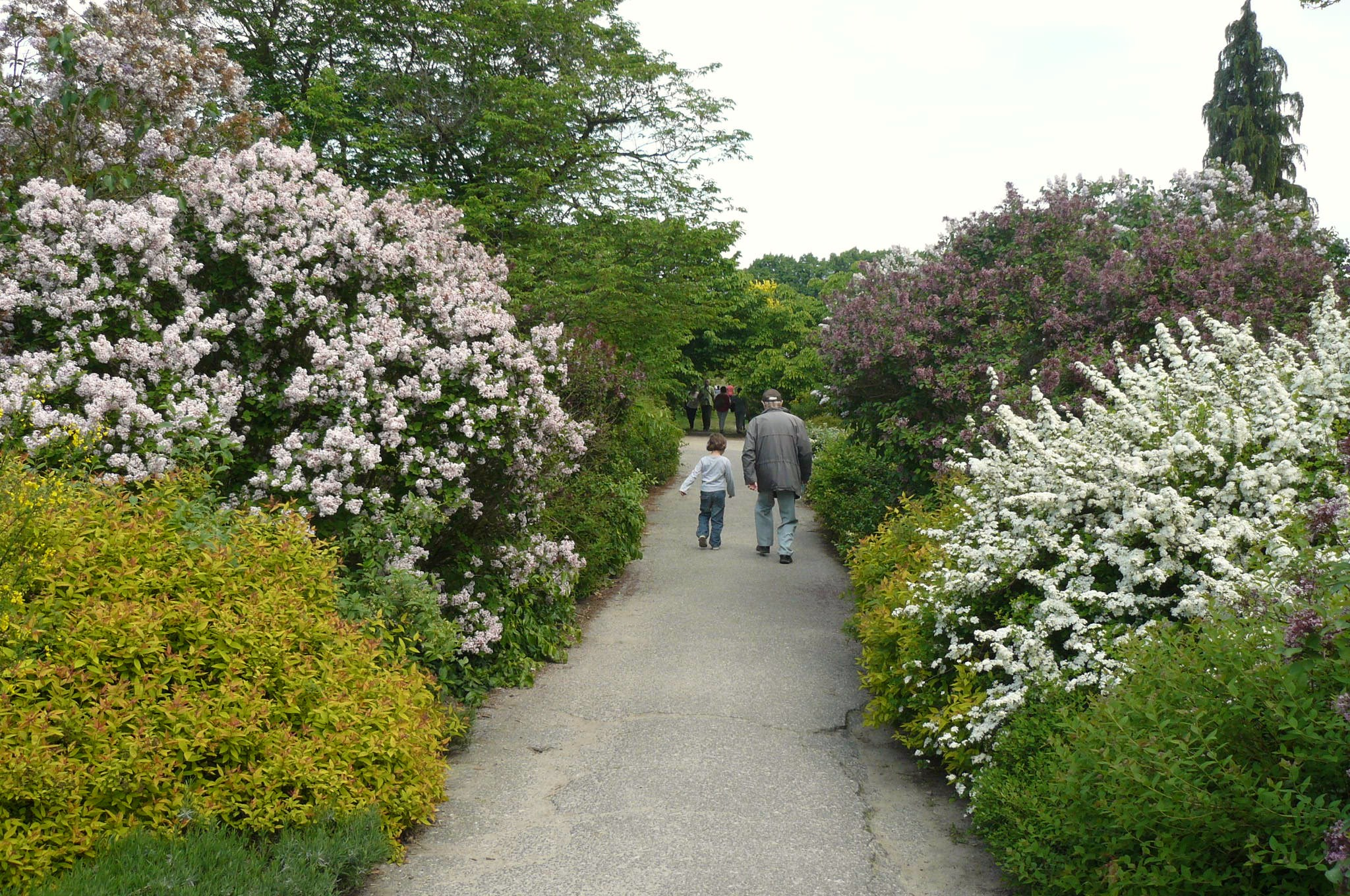
A pathway in Kórnik Arboretum

The Kórnik Arboretum in Kórnik, in western Poland, is the largest and oldest arboretum in Poland and fourth-largest arboretum in Europe, with over 3300 taxa of trees and shrubs. It was established in the early 19th century around the historical Kórnik Castle by its owner, Count Tytus Działyński, later enriched with new species and varieties by his heirs, his son Jan Kanty Działyński and grandson Władysław Zamoyski.

The arboretum covers over 40 hectares (99 acres) and is famous for rich collections of rhododendrons, azaleas, magnolias, conifers, lilacs, apple trees, cherries, meadowsweets, honeysuckles, poplars, birches, and other woody species from all over the world. Old specimens of native and alien trees and shrubs can be seen there, such as lindens, beeches, oaks, maidenhair trees, arborvitaes, spruces, and firs.

The Institute of Dendrology of the Polish Academy of Sciences is located within the arboretum.

In 2010, a 3.5-kilometre long educational trail called Trees of the World was opened in the arboretum. It enables visitors to see and obtain botanical information on 25 major species of trees found in North America, Asia and Europe.

== See also ==
- Arboretum
- Botanical garden
- Kórnik Castle

== Gallery ==
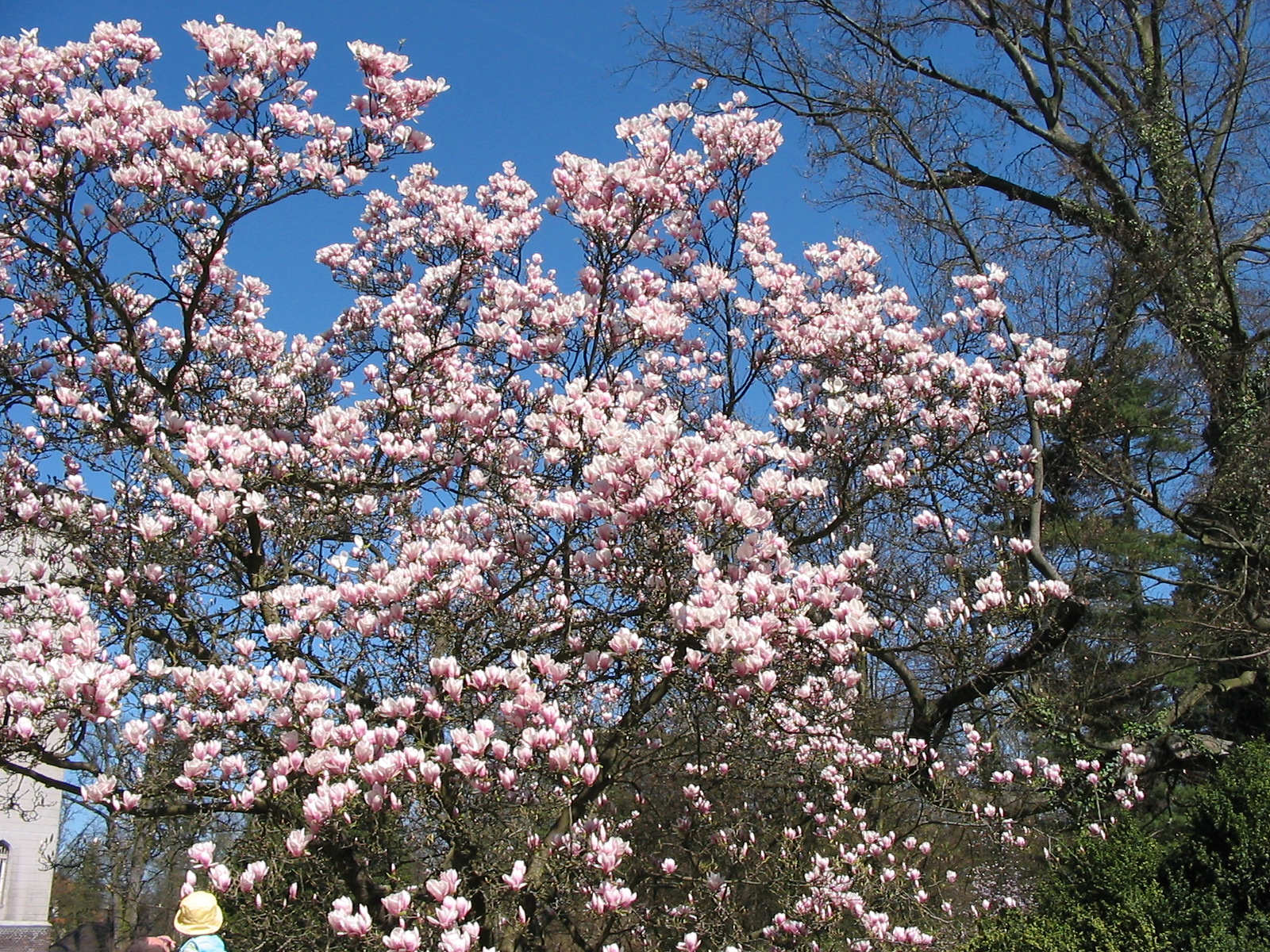
Magnolia near the Kórnik Castle in the Kórnik Arboretum

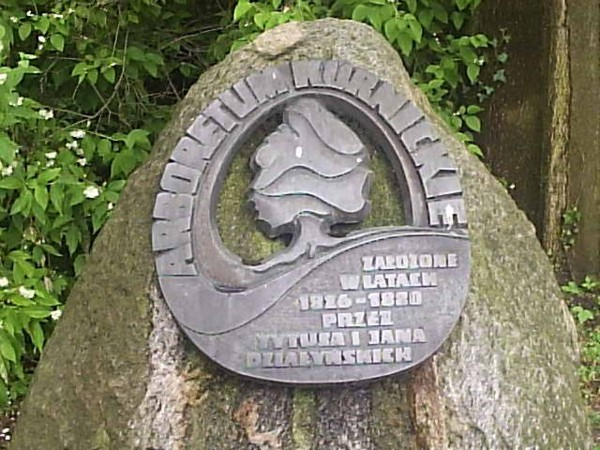
Commemorative plaque of Tytus Działyński, who founded the Kórnik Arboretum

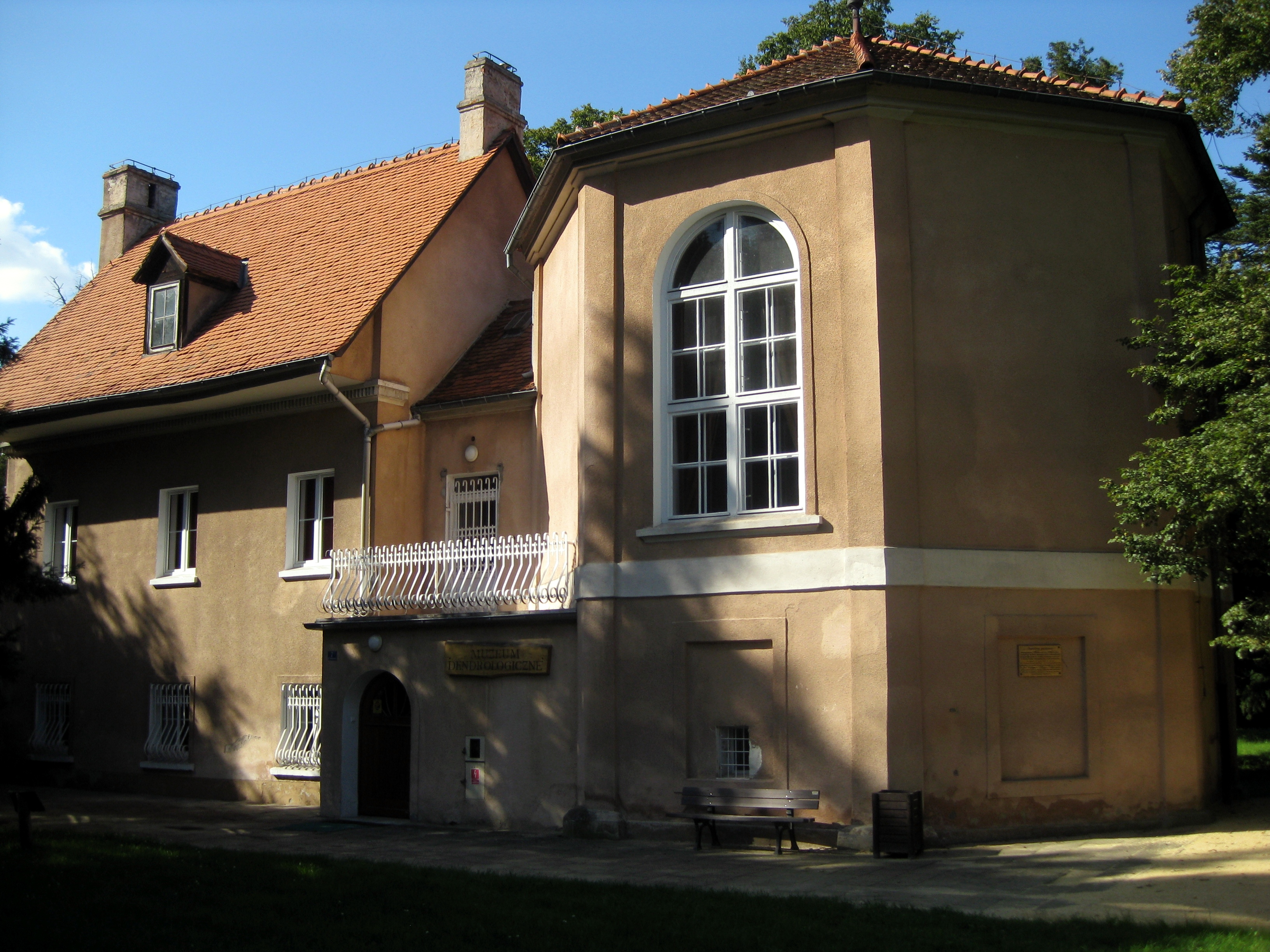
Dendrological museum in the Kórnik Arboretum

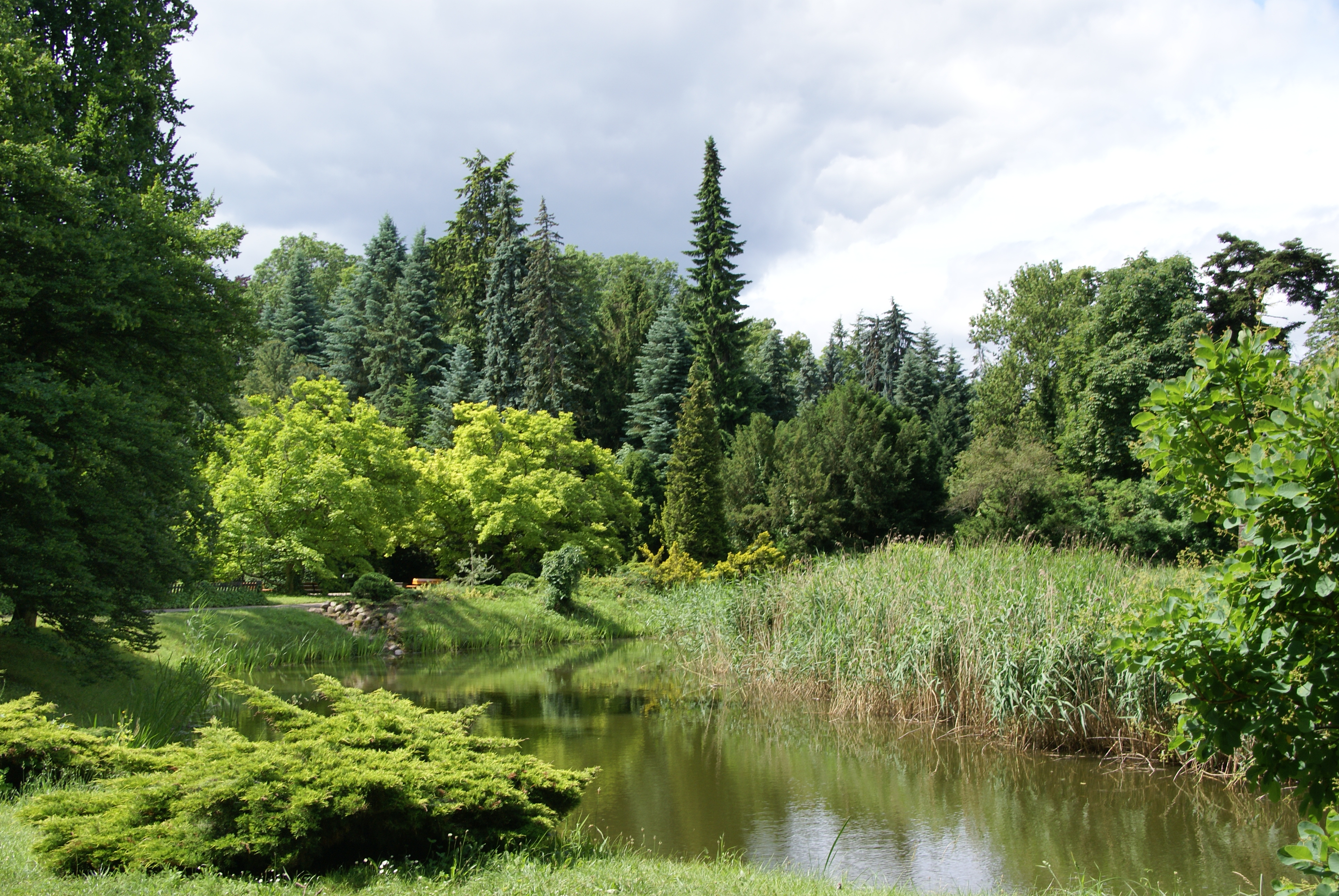
Collection of trees beside a pond in the Kórnik Arboretum

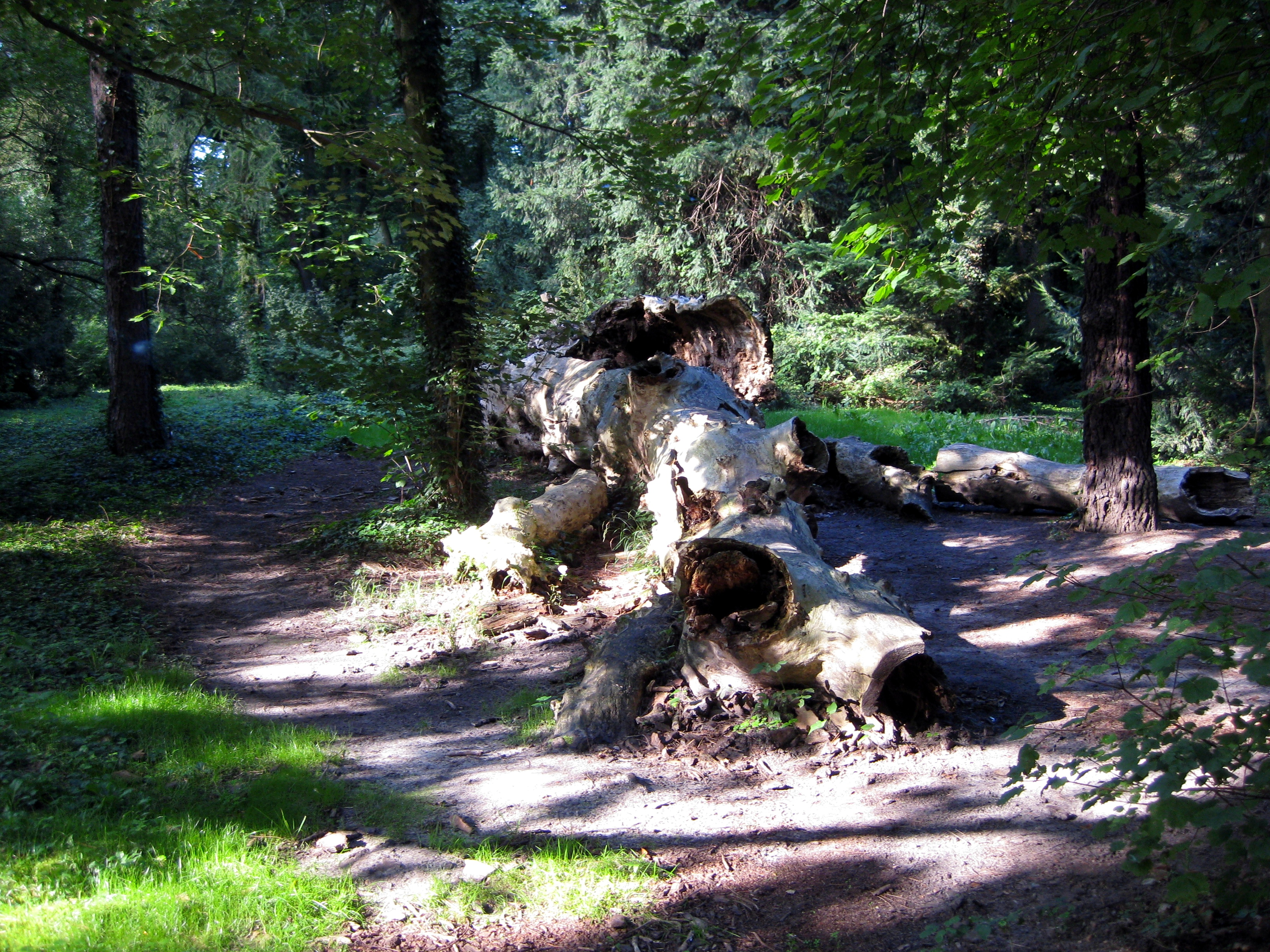
Rotten tree trunk in the Kórnik Arboretum

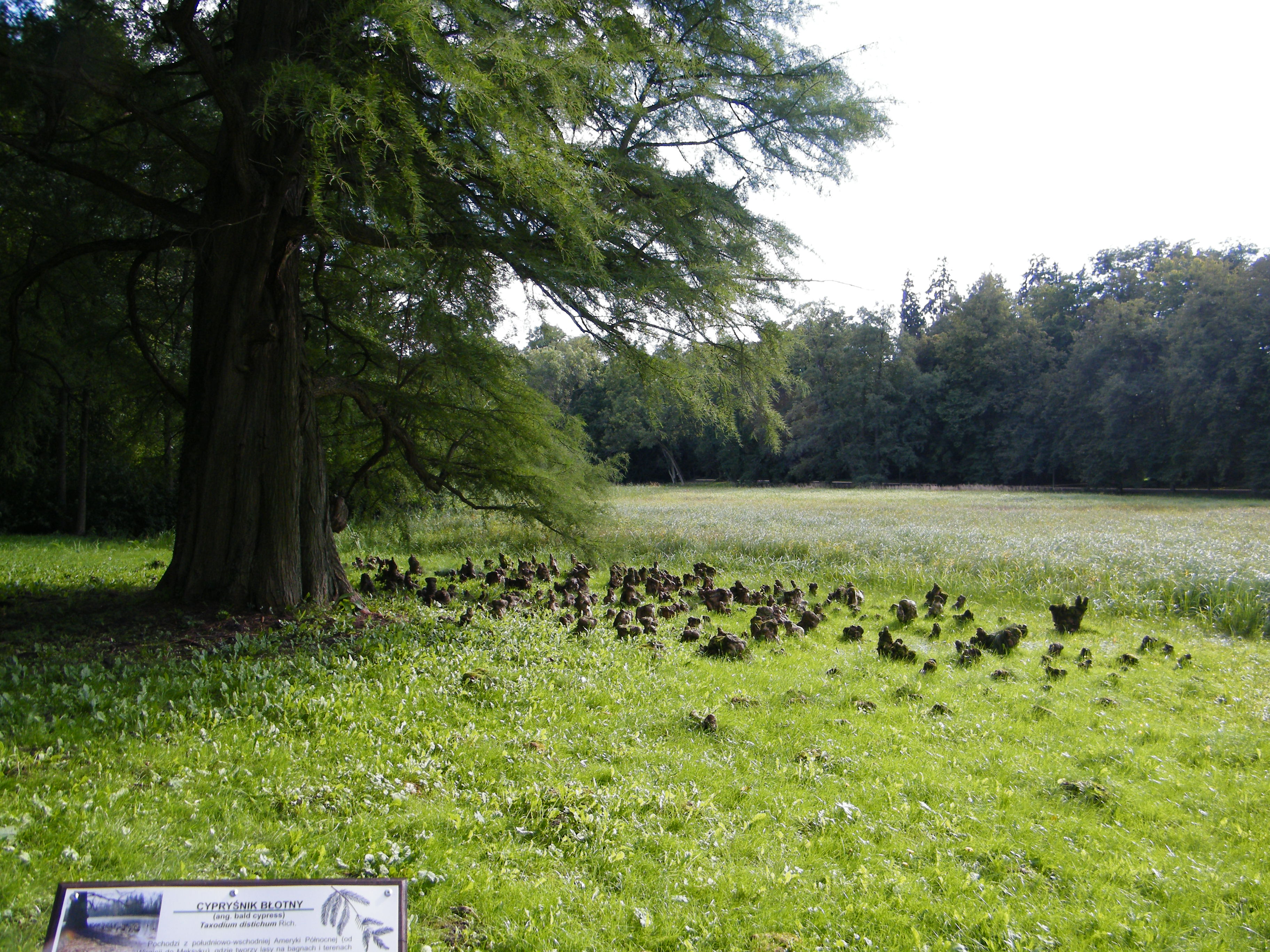
Bald cypress in the Kórnik Arboretum

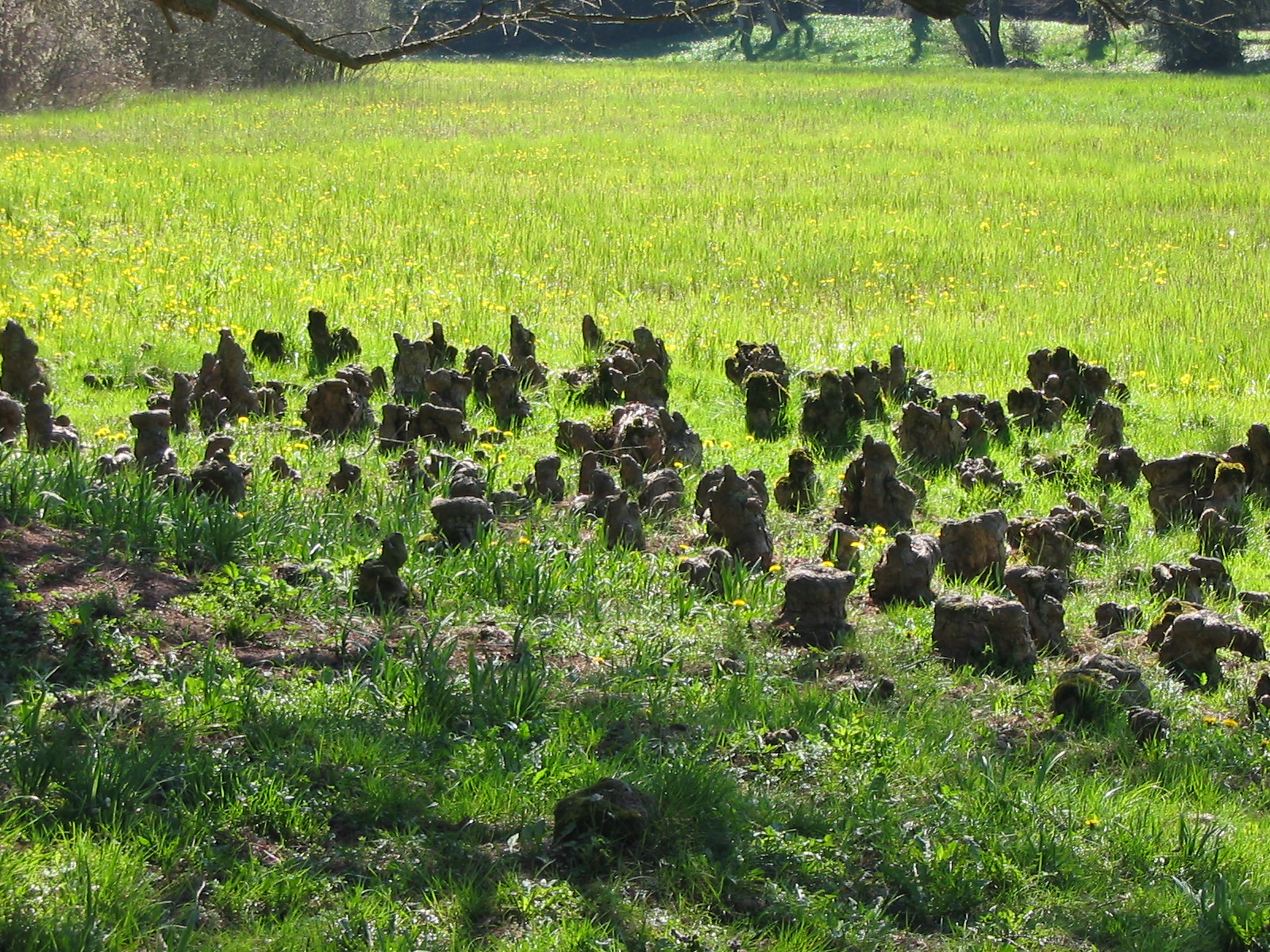
Pneumatophores of bald cypress in the Kórnik Arboretum

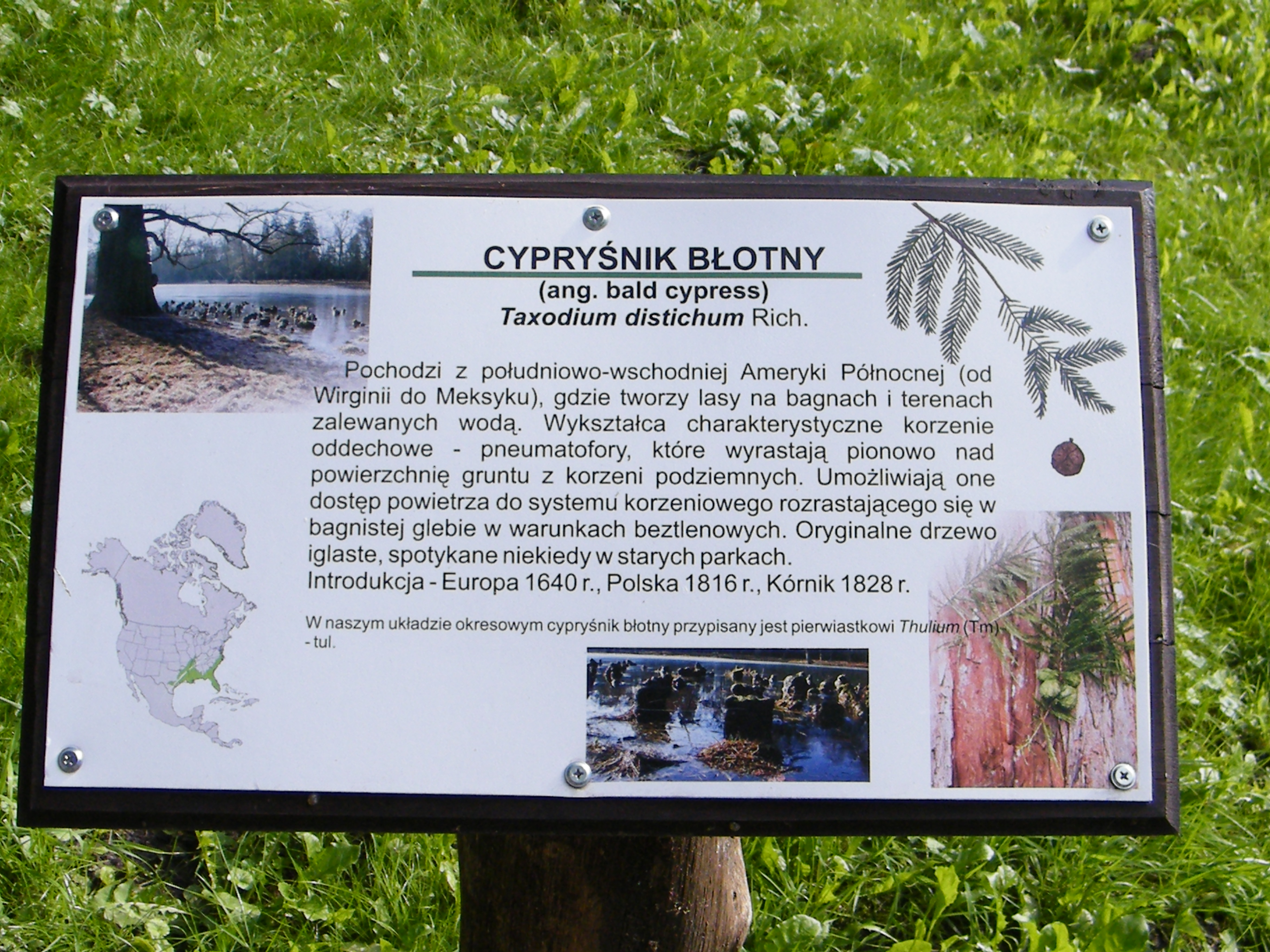
Label of the bald cypress

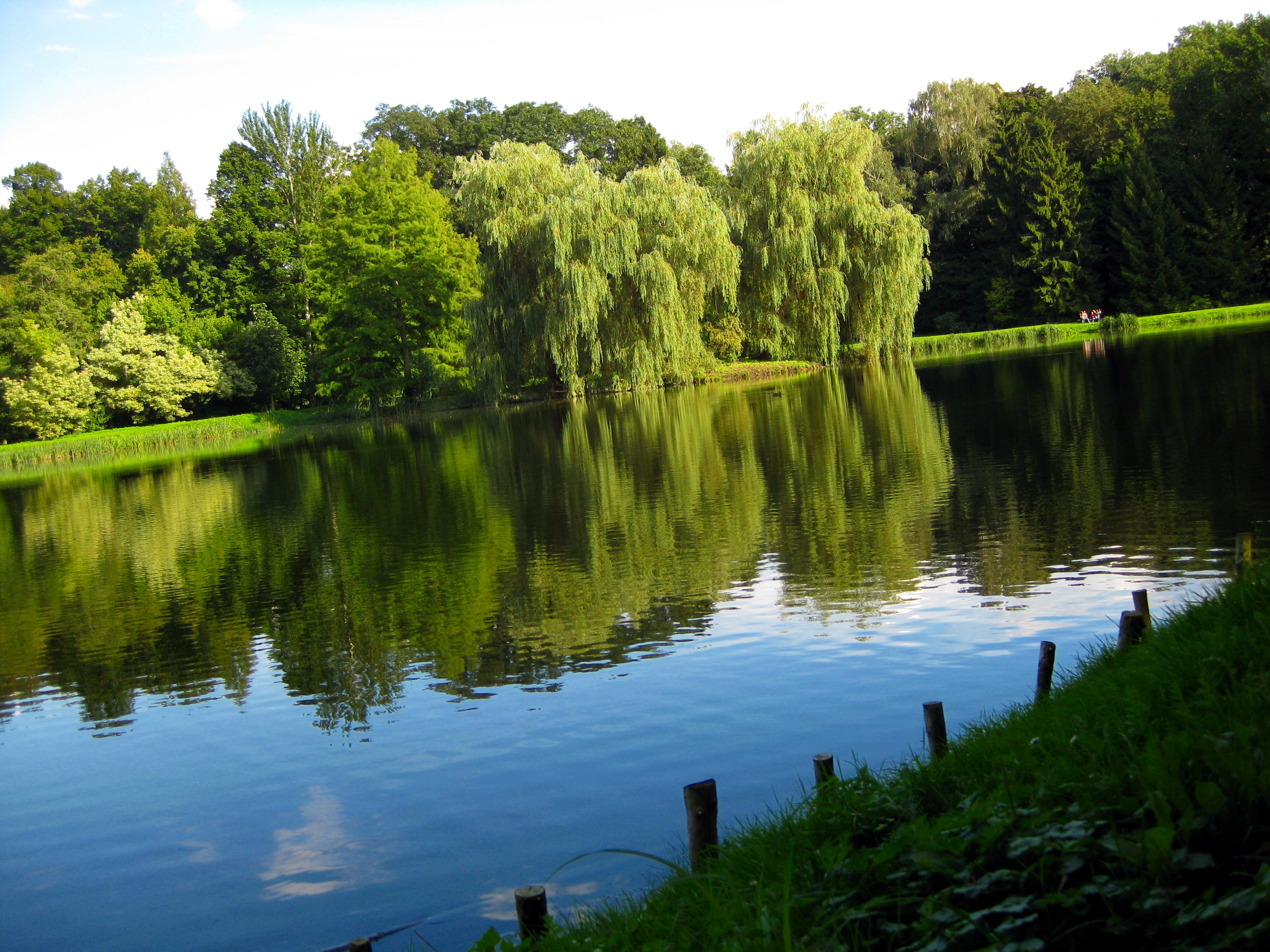
A pond in Kórnik Arboretum

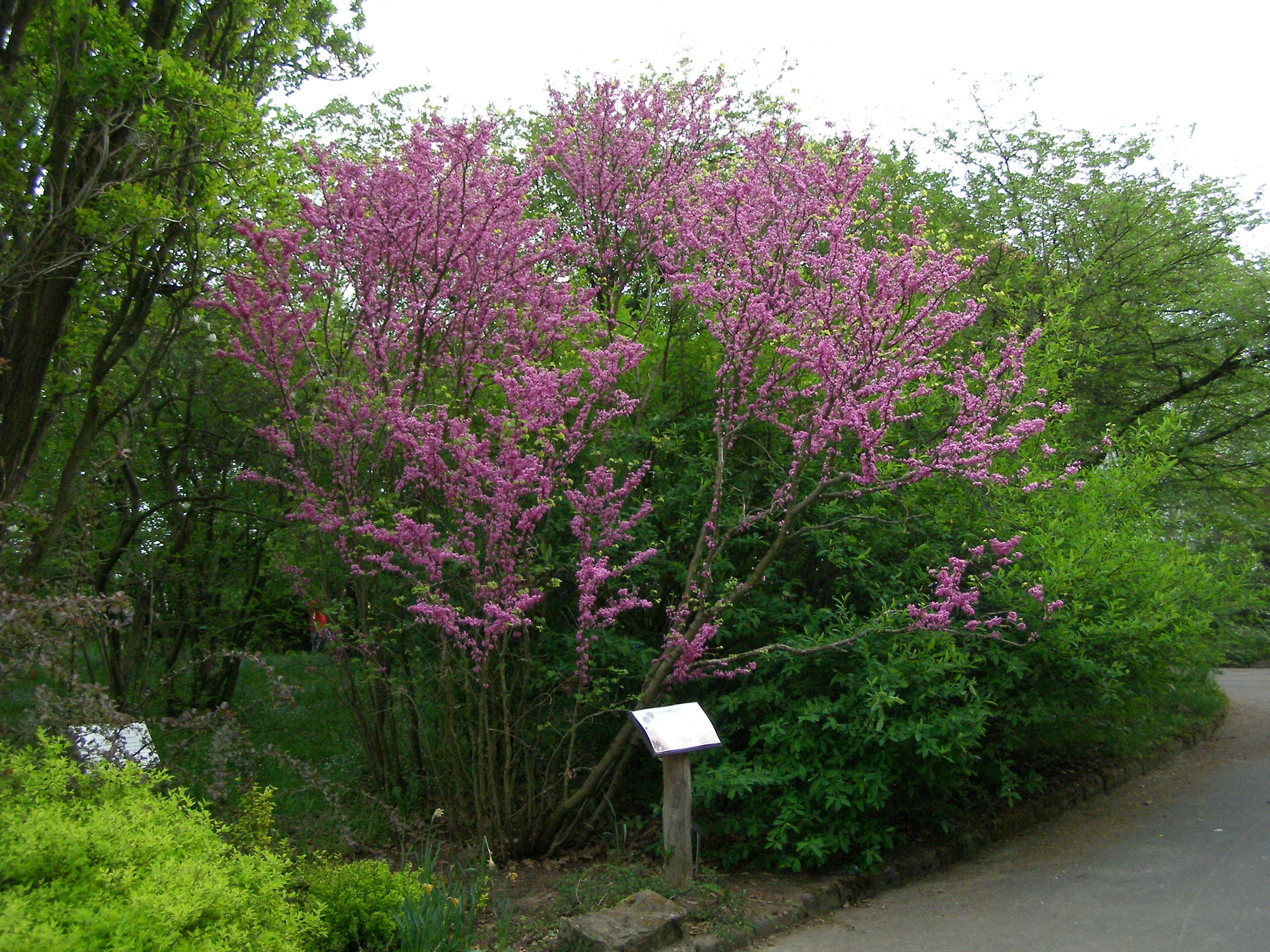
The Chinese redbud

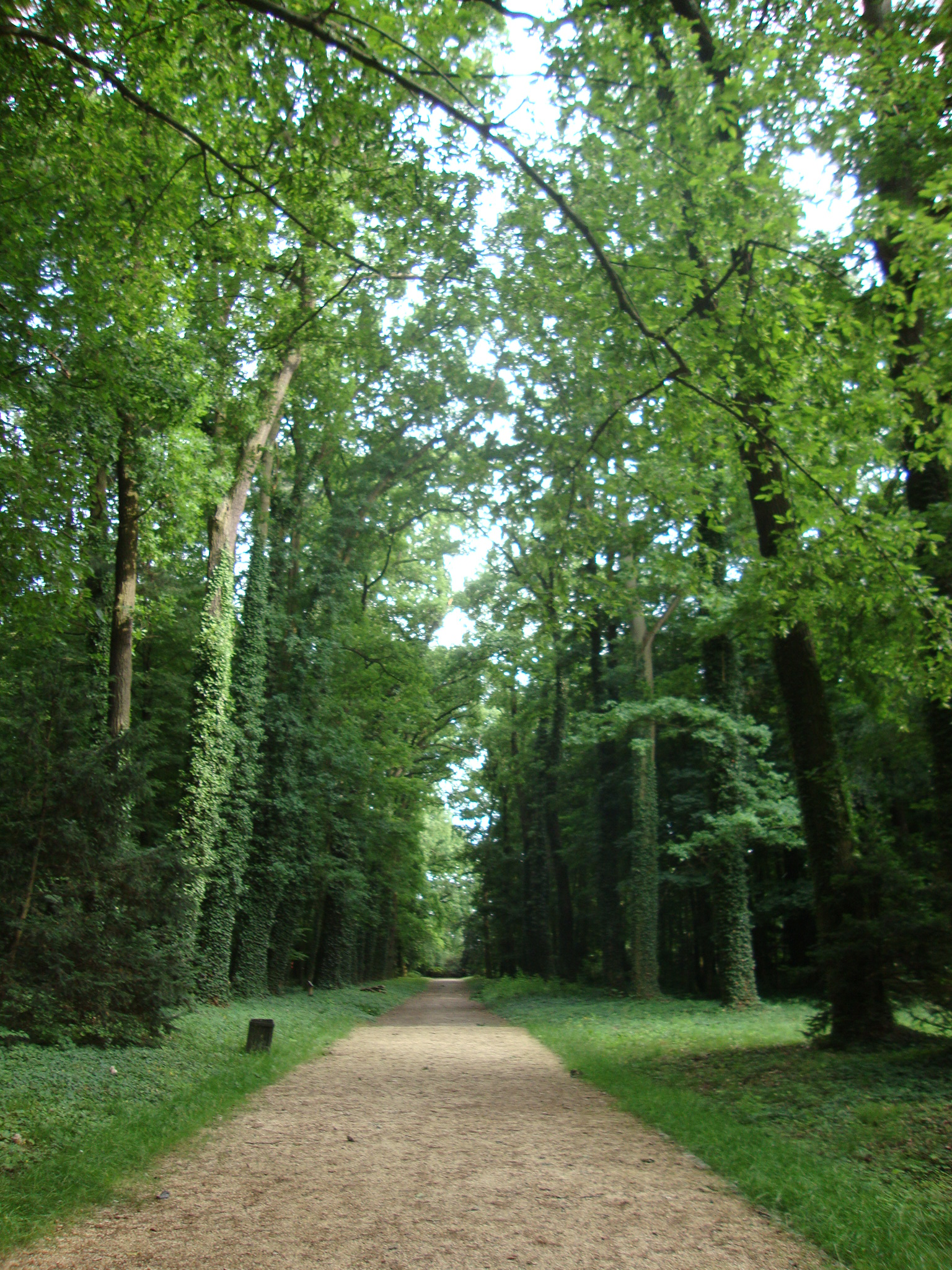
A park alley
