= Kórnik Library =

Library in Poland

Coordinates: 52°14′41″N 17°05′27″E

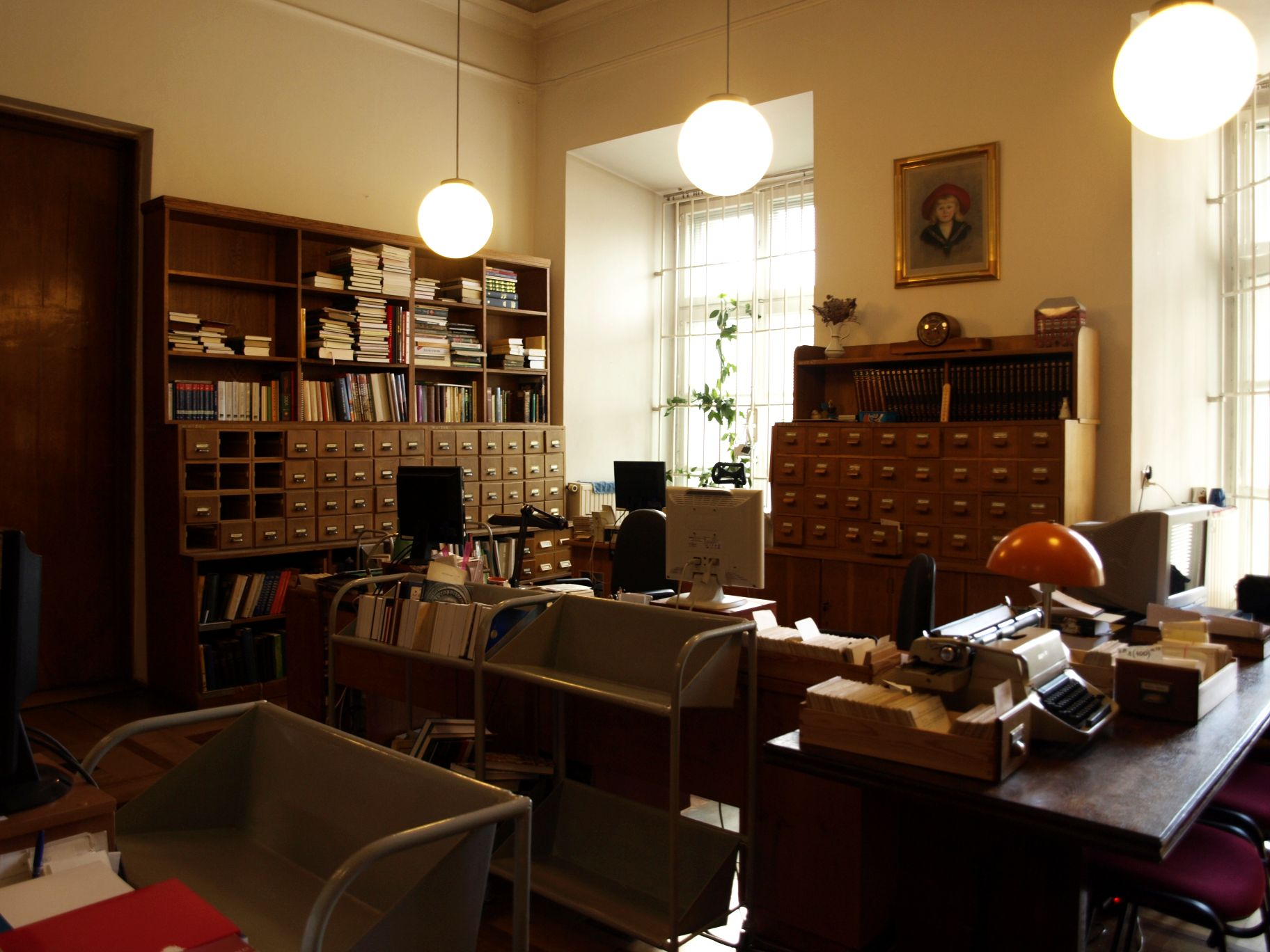
Part of Kórnik Library, located in Kórnik Castle

Kórnik Library (Polish: Biblioteka Kórnicka) is one of the most famous Polish libraries, founded by Tytus Działyński in 1828 in the town of Kórnik. Currently the library, despite being robbed by the Germans during World War II, is one of the five largest libraries in Poland and contains roughly 400,000 volumes, including 30,000 books older than 150 years, Baron von der Lasa's 2,000-volume collection on chess history, and 14,000 manuscripts (including Napoleon's romantic novella Clisson et Eugénie, Adam Mickiewicz's Dziady (Part III) and a number of works by Juliusz Słowacki).

Since 1953, it is a part of the National Library of Poland.

== See also ==
- Kórnik Castle
- Działyński Palace
- List of libraries in Poland
