= Działyński Palace =

Coordinates: 52°24′31″N 16°55′57″E

- Pałac Działyńskich
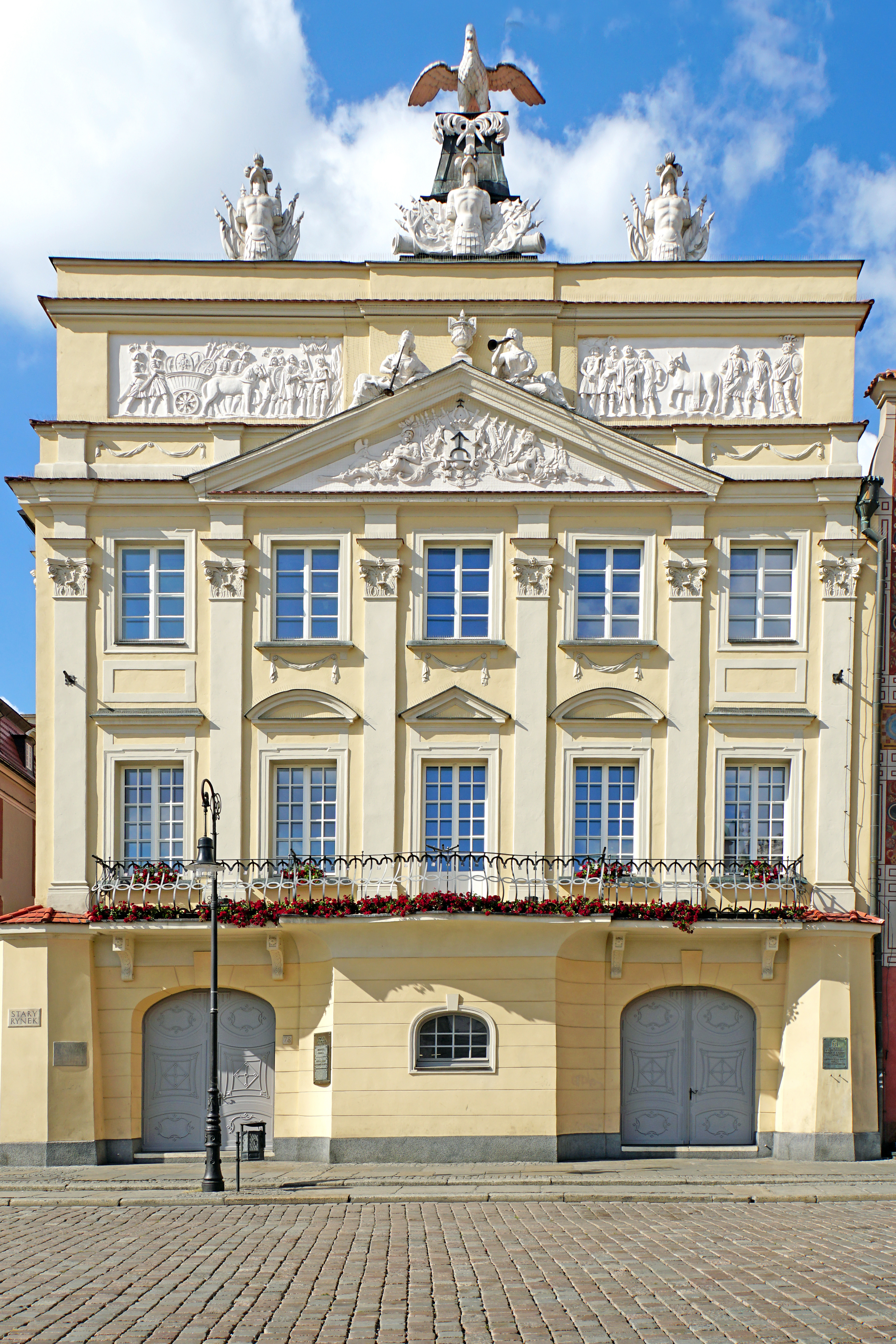
- The facade of the palace
- Interactive map of the Działyński Palace area

General information
- Architectural style: Baroque
- Location: Stary Rynek 78, Poznań, Poland
- Year built: 1773-1776, 1953-1957
- Destroyed: 1945

Design and construction
- Architect: Antoni Höhne

Działyński Palace in Poznań, Poland is a Baroque palace built in 1773 to 1776. The building features a rich stucco-decorated interior of its "Red Hall" and a classicist façade decorated with sculptures. The palace serves as one of the locations of Kórnik Library today.
