= Ludomir Sleńdziński =

Polish painter (1889–1980)

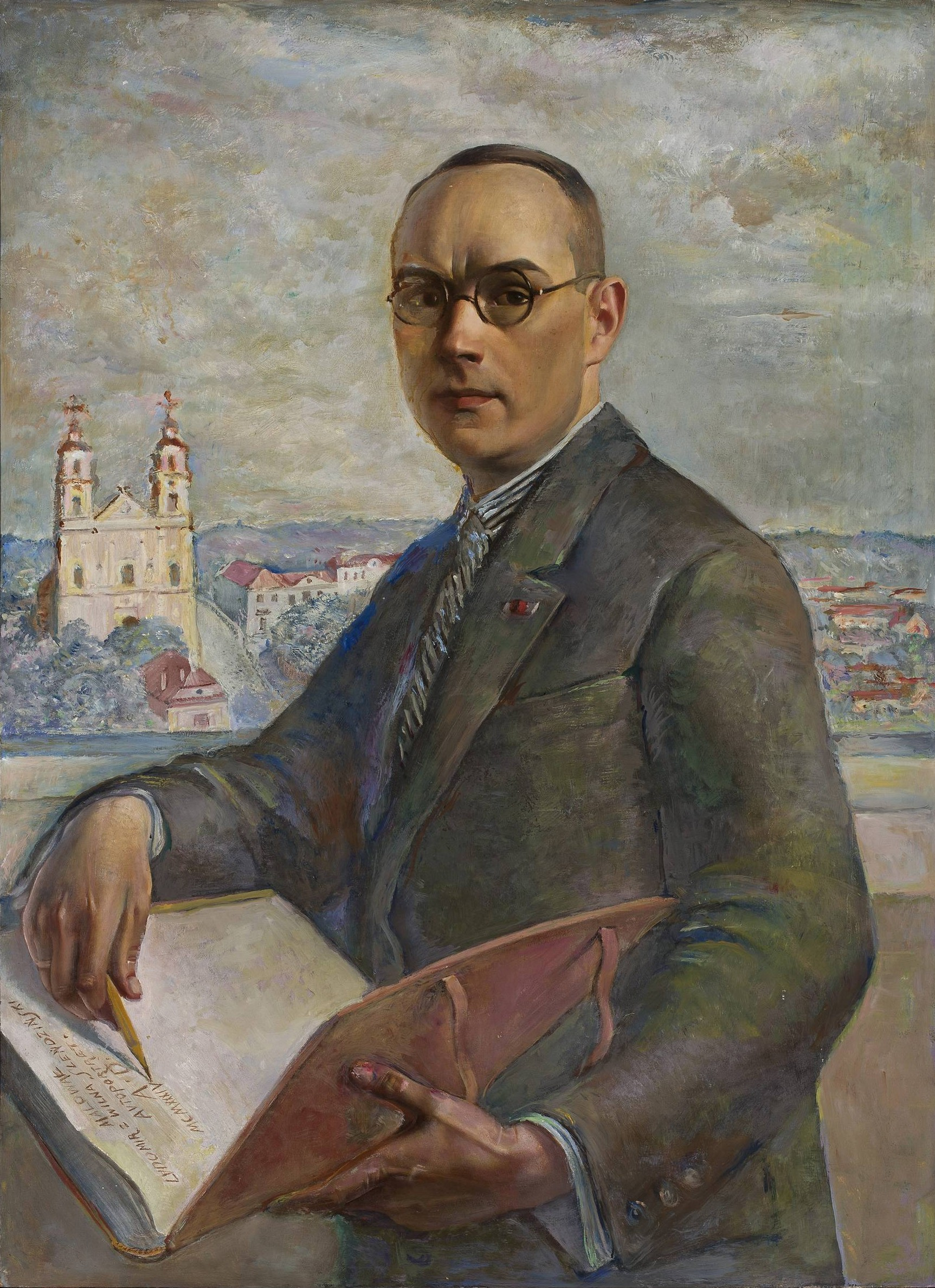
- Self-portrait, 1934
- Born: 29 October 1889; Vilna, Russian Empire
- Died: 26 November 1980 (aged 91); Kraków, Poland
- Occupation: Painter

Ludomir Sleńdziński (29 October 1889 – 26 November 1980) was a Polish painter, sculptor and teacher, regarded as the leading figure of the so-called Vilnius school of painting.

== Biography ==
Sleńdziński was born in 1889 in Vilna, Russian Empire into an artistic family. His father, Wincenty, and his grandfather, Aleksandr, were painters. Between 1909 and 1916 he trained at the Imperial Academy of Fine Arts in Saint Petersburg under Dmitry Kardovsky, a member of the Mir iskusstva circle. After spending the years 1917–1920 in Yekaterinoslav and Uman, he returned to Vilnius in 1920.

There, he helped found the Vilnius Society of Fine Artists (Wileńskie Towarzystwo Artystów Plastyków), which he chaired until 1939. In 1923 he joined the Warsaw art group Rytm ("Rhythm"), and in the same year completed a government-commissioned ceiling painting in the Palace of the Council of Ministers in Warsaw. A journey to Italy in 1923–1924 introduced him to the art of the Quattrocento artists, which shaped his lifelong emphasis on drawing.

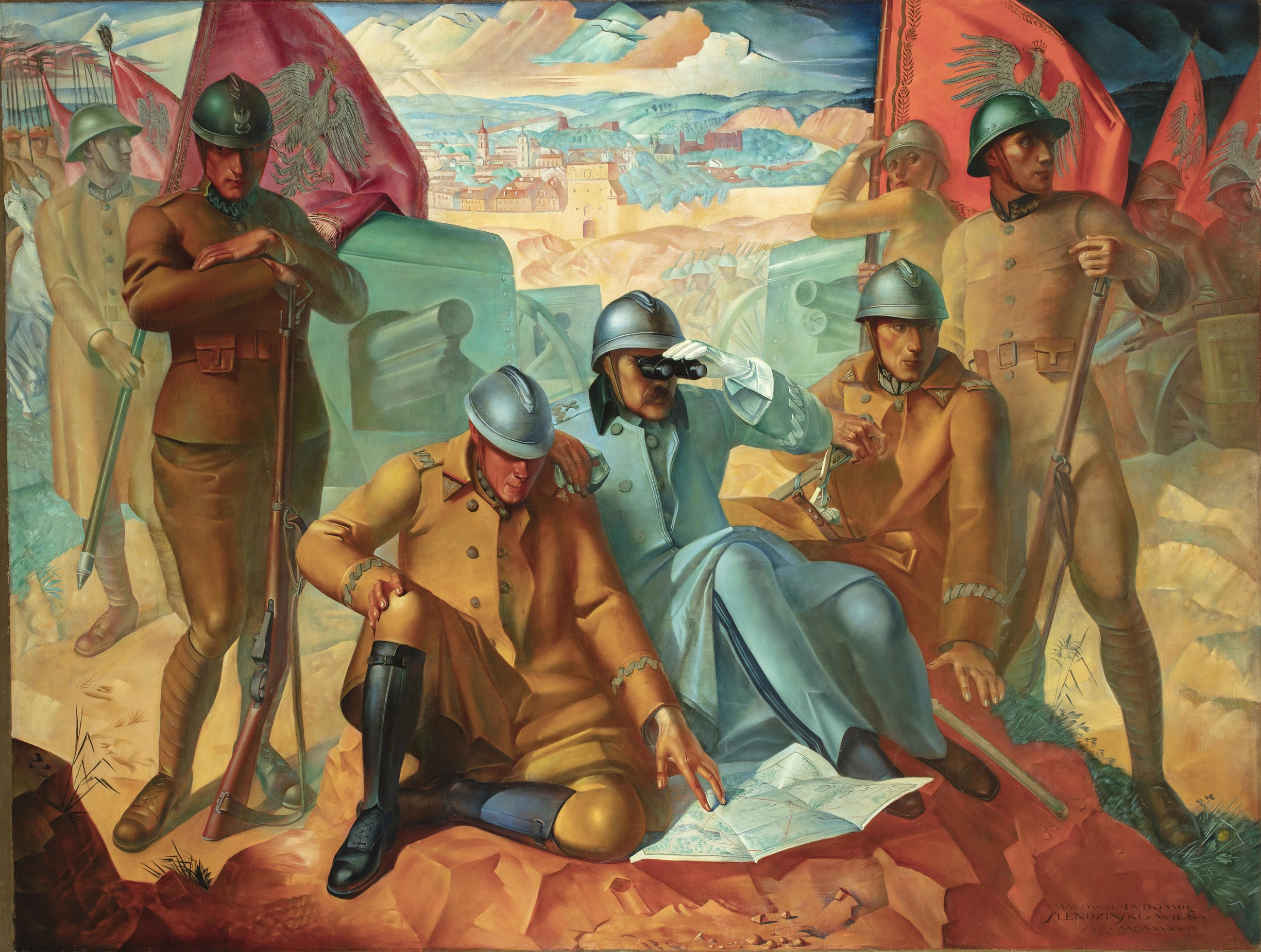
Jozef Pilsudski in Vilna, 1927

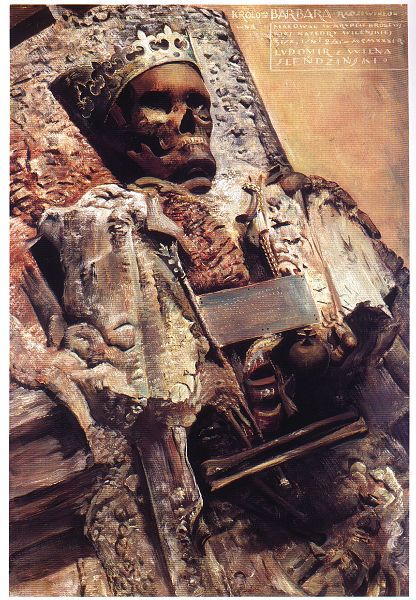
Remains of Barbara Radziwiłł, 1931

From 1925 he held the chair of monumental painting at the Faculty of Fine Arts of Stefan Batory University in Vilnius; that year he married Irena Dobrowolska in Rome. He travelled widely to study the old masters, visiting France, Spain, England, Greece, Egypt, Syria, Lebanon, Turkey and Palestine. His work was part of the painting event in the art competition at the 1928 Summer Olympics. During the German occupation he remained in Vilnius; he was arrested and sent to a forced-labour camp at Pravieniškės; in this period he turned increasingly to sculpture and bas-relief.

In 1945 he moved to Kraków and joined the Kraków University of Technology, taking charge of the department of drawing and sculpture in its Faculty of Architecture. He served as vice-rector and then rector of the university between 1948 and 1956. He died in Kraków in 1980 and was buried at Salwator Cemetery.

== Work ==
Sleńdziński's art combined the academic discipline of his Saint Petersburg training with an admiration for the Italian Renaissance. He was preoccupied with craft and with reviving the methods of earlier masters, favouring panels of wood and gesso over canvas, which he considered less noble. He frequently applied gilding and silvering and modelled parts of his pictures in low relief, so that some compositions edged towards the polychrome relief and free-standing sculpture he pursued in later years. The human figure stood at the centre of his output, which consisted chiefly of portraits and figural compositions.

Among his best-known works is Grający w guziki ("Boys Playing Buttons", also titled "Street Urchins"), an oil painting of 1928 held by the National Museum in Warsaw, depicting two children at play in a courtyard. After the war he continued to paint portraits and produced autobiographical cycles, notably Mój pamiętnik ("My Diary", 1965–1966).

== Recognition ==
Sleńdziński exhibited internationally from the 1920s, including at the Venice Biennale (1926, 1932, 1936) and the 1935 Brussels World's Fair. He received an award from the Polish Academy of Learning in 1928 for a portrait of his wife, and a gold medal at the 1937 Paris "Art and Technology" exhibition for a polychrome relief portrait of his mother. A retrospective of his work was held at the National Museum in Warsaw in 1973. The Sleńdziński Gallery in Białystok, opened in 1993, preserves much of his works and the archive.
