= Kórnik Castle =

Kórnik Castle Zamek w Kórniku
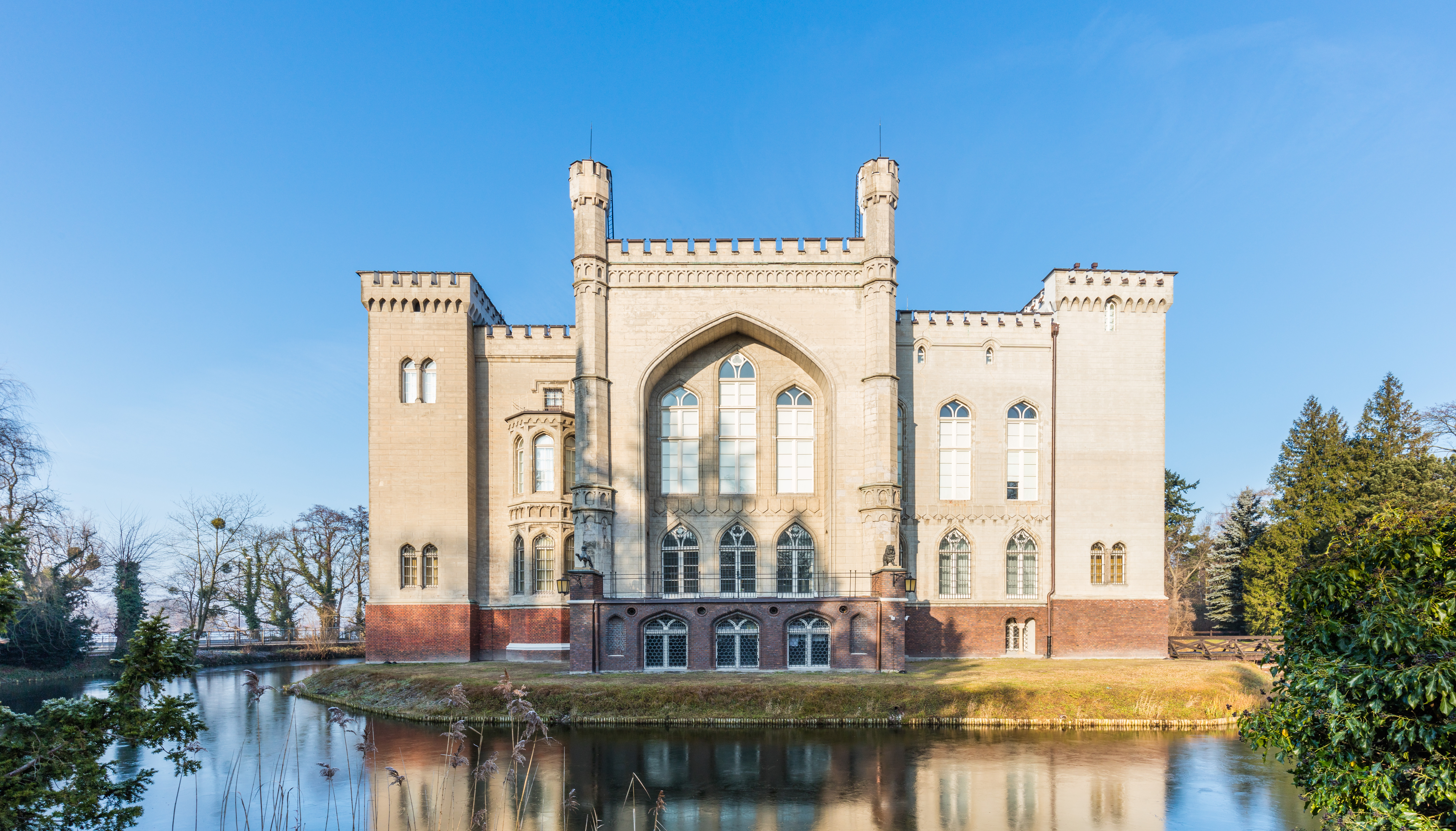
- Kórnik Castle

- Location within Poland
- 52°14′38″N 17°05′26″E
- Location: Kórnik, Poland

History
- Built: 15th century

Site notes
- Architect(s): Karl Friedrich Schinkel, Tytus Działyński, Marian Cybulski (remodelling)

Historic Monument of Poland
- Designated: 2011-06-15
- Part of: Kórnik – castle and park complex with the parish church, owners' necropolis
- Reference no.: Dz. U. z 2011 r. Nr 143, poz. 836

Kórnik Castle (Polish: Zamek w Kórniku or Zamek Kórnicki) is a castle in the Polish town of Kórnik, which was constructed in the 14th century. The current neogothic design and remodeling was done in 1855 partly on the basis of architect Karl Friedrich Schinkel's plans for Tytus Działyński and the son Jan Kanty Działyński. After the death of the last member of the Działyński family, Jan Kanty Działyński, his brother-in-law Count Władysław Zamoyski received the castle in Jan's will. Shortly before his death in 1924, the childless count willed the castle, along with an extensive art collection and the Kórnik Arboretum, to the Polish state.

The castle currently houses a museum and the Kórnik Library. It's one of Poland's official national Historic Monuments (Pomnik historii), as designated July 11, 2011 and tracked by the National Heritage Board of Poland.

== Exterior of the castle ==
The current look of the castle resembles Gothic Revival architecture, one of the popular historicising styles in the 19th century. The main entrance to the castle is located at the northern side. Its characteristic feature is a four-centred arch at the top of the window above the entrance. Up until the interwar period the castle was entered through the so-called babiniec – a barbican-shaped chamber which was subsequently demolished in the years 1925–1939.

The western side of the castle features an expanded terrace overlooking Lake Kórnik. The southern side is dominated by a chaitya arch, which was probably modelled on the Royal Pavilion in Brighton and the Islamic architecture of India. On the eastern side, there is a Gothic Revival tower whose red brick façade clearly contrasts with the rest of the castle. The tower was erected during the remodelling of the castle by Tytus Działyński.

Also near the entry to the Kórnik Castle are historic outbuildings and a carriage house.

The castle is surrounded by Kórnik Arboretum founded by Count Tytus Działyński in the first half of the 19th century - the oldest and largest one in Poland as well as the fourth largest arboretum in Europe covering around 40 hectares and containing more than 3300 taxa of trees and shrubs.

== Interior of the castle ==
The castle presently houses the Kórnik Library and a museum showcasing numerous unique objects including historic furniture, Ukrainian and European paintings, sculptures, numismatic collections, military antiques, porcelain and silver art objects. Among the most significant works in the library are the original manuscript of Adam Mickiewicz's Dziady (Part III) and Napoleon's hand-written romantic novella Clisson et Eugénie.

The most impressive chamber of the residence is the Moor Room, which was inspired by the Court of the Lions in Alhambra, Spain. It was initially intended for a library but later it became a museum room featuring national works of art. In the room below the tower, there are ethnographic and natural collections on display brought from Australia and Oceania by Count Władysław Zamoyski who inherited the estate from his maternal uncle, Jan Kanty, in 1881.

== Trivia ==
During the German occupation of Poland (World War II), in 1939–1940, a secret printing house of the Polish resistance movement was located in the castle. It printed the Biuletyn Radiowy underground newspaper.

== Gallery ==
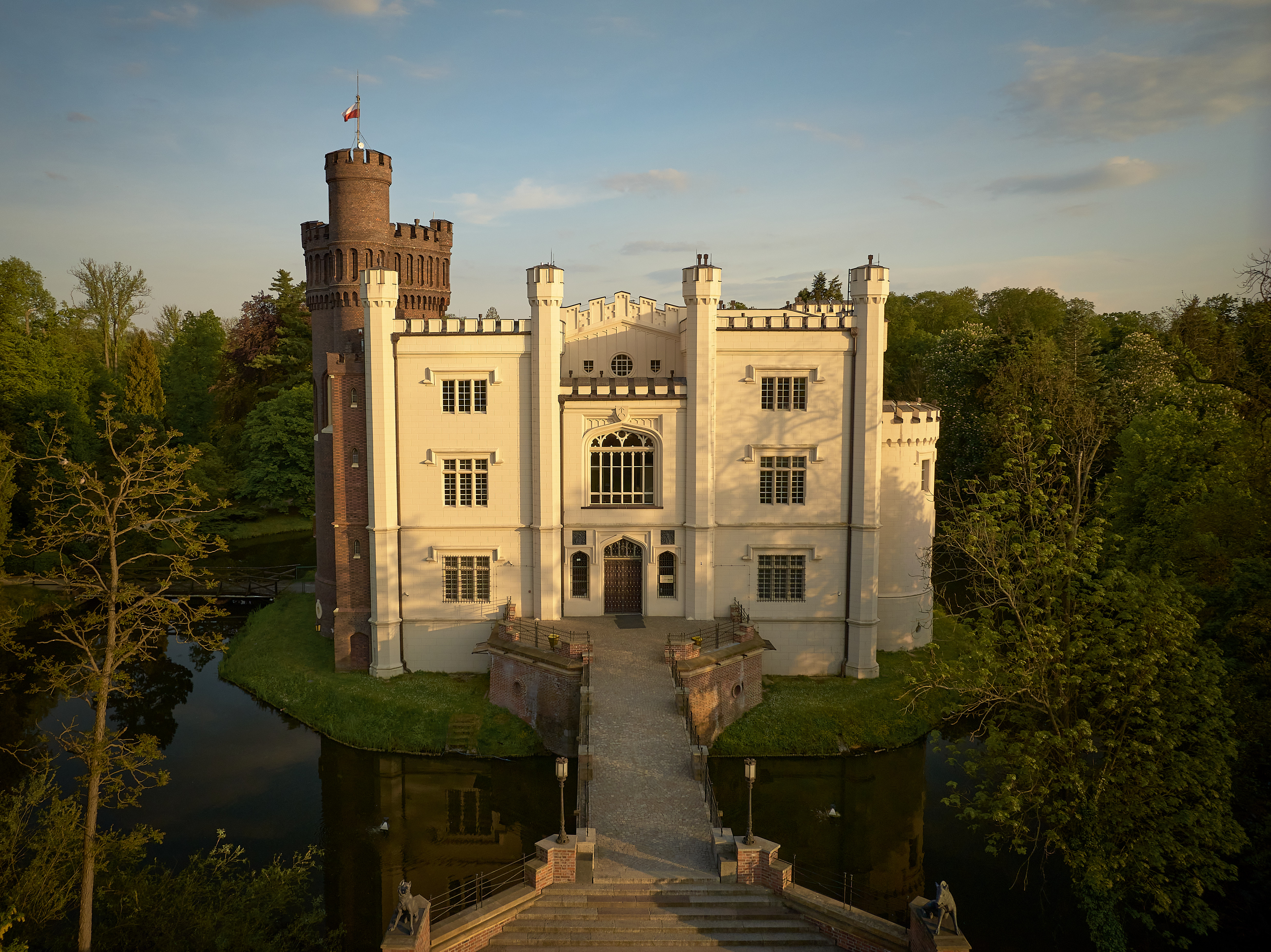
The castle at sunset

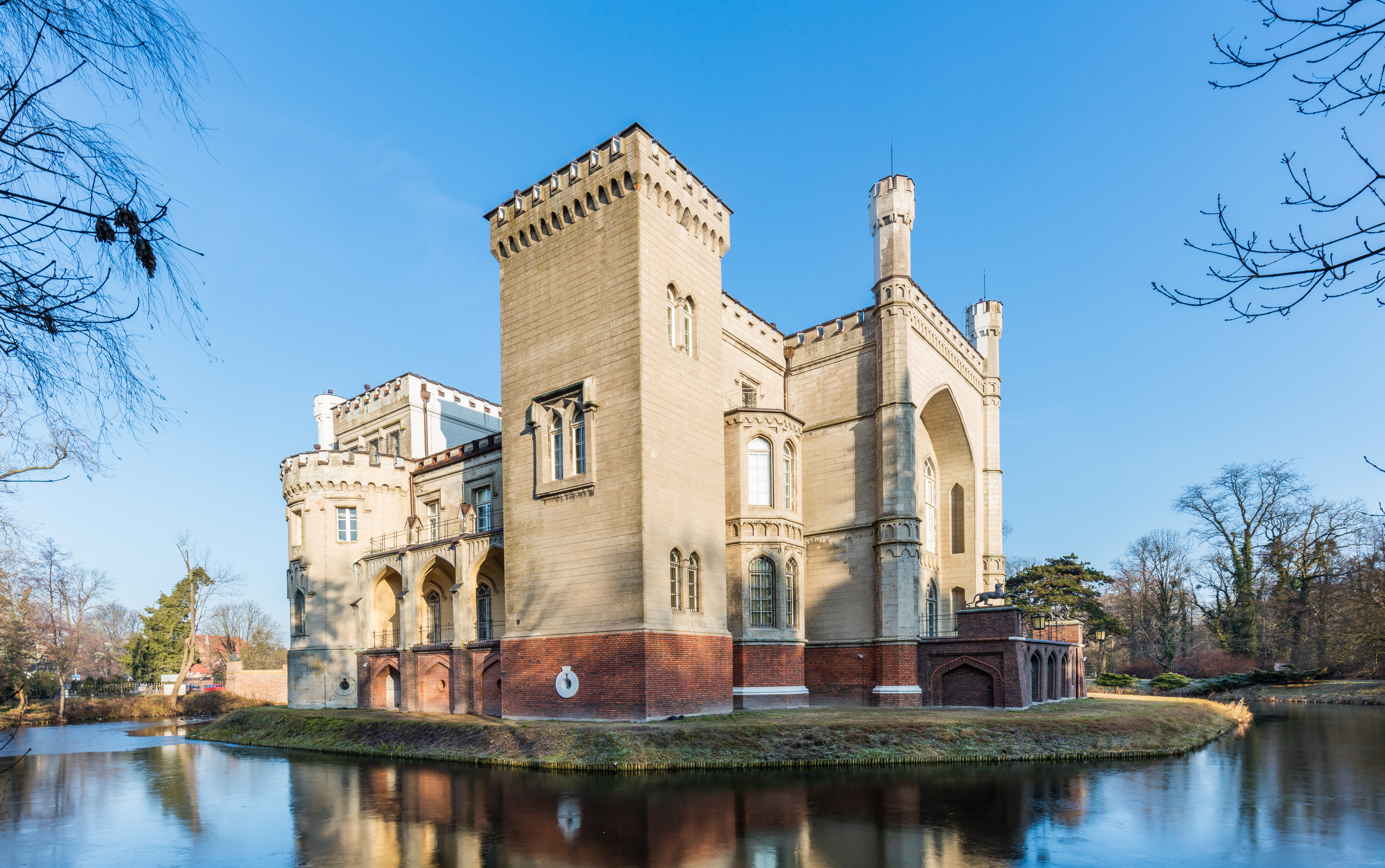
The castle and the moat

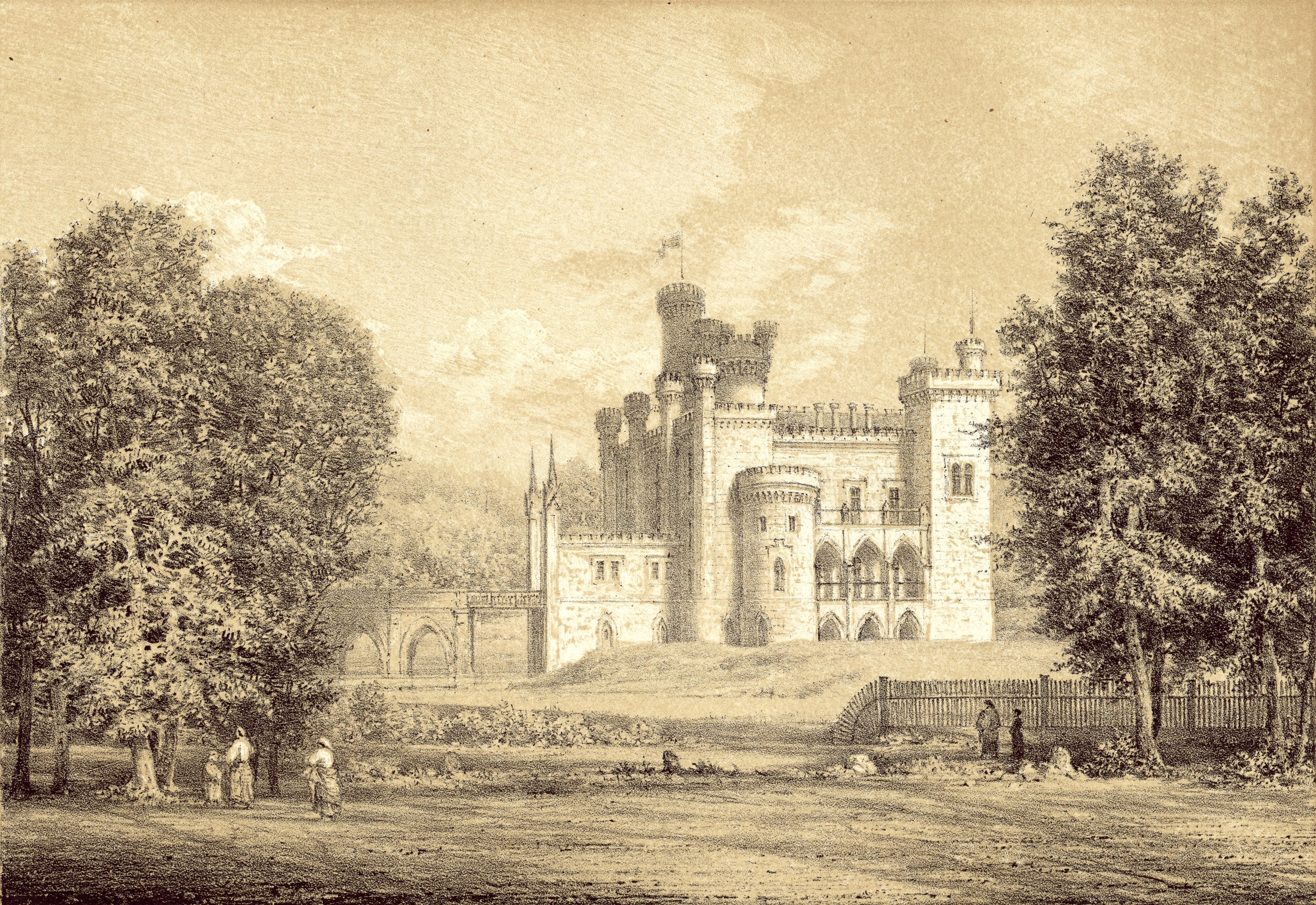
Działyński Castle in Kórnik, by Napoleon Orda

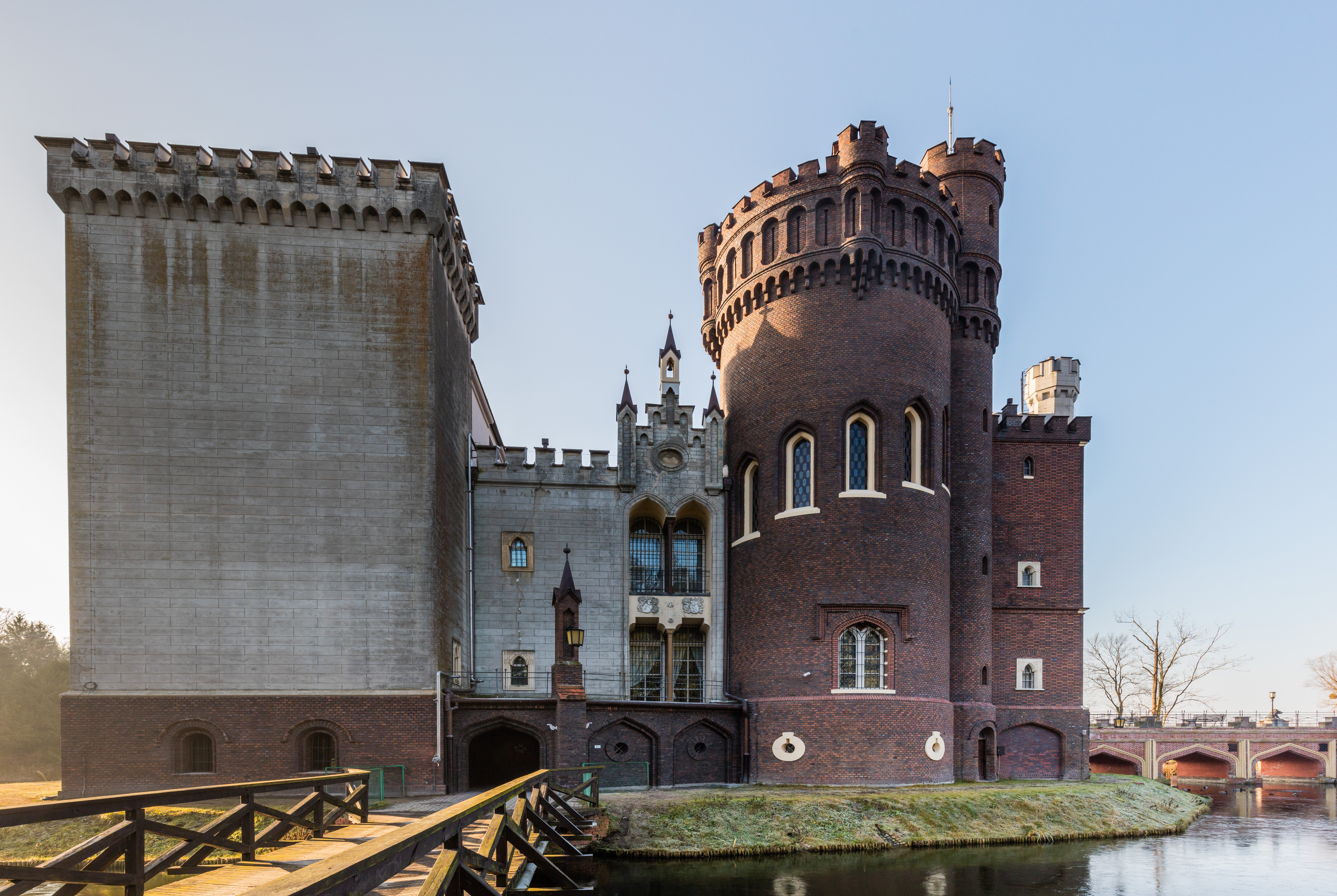
The Gothic Revival tower of the castle on the right

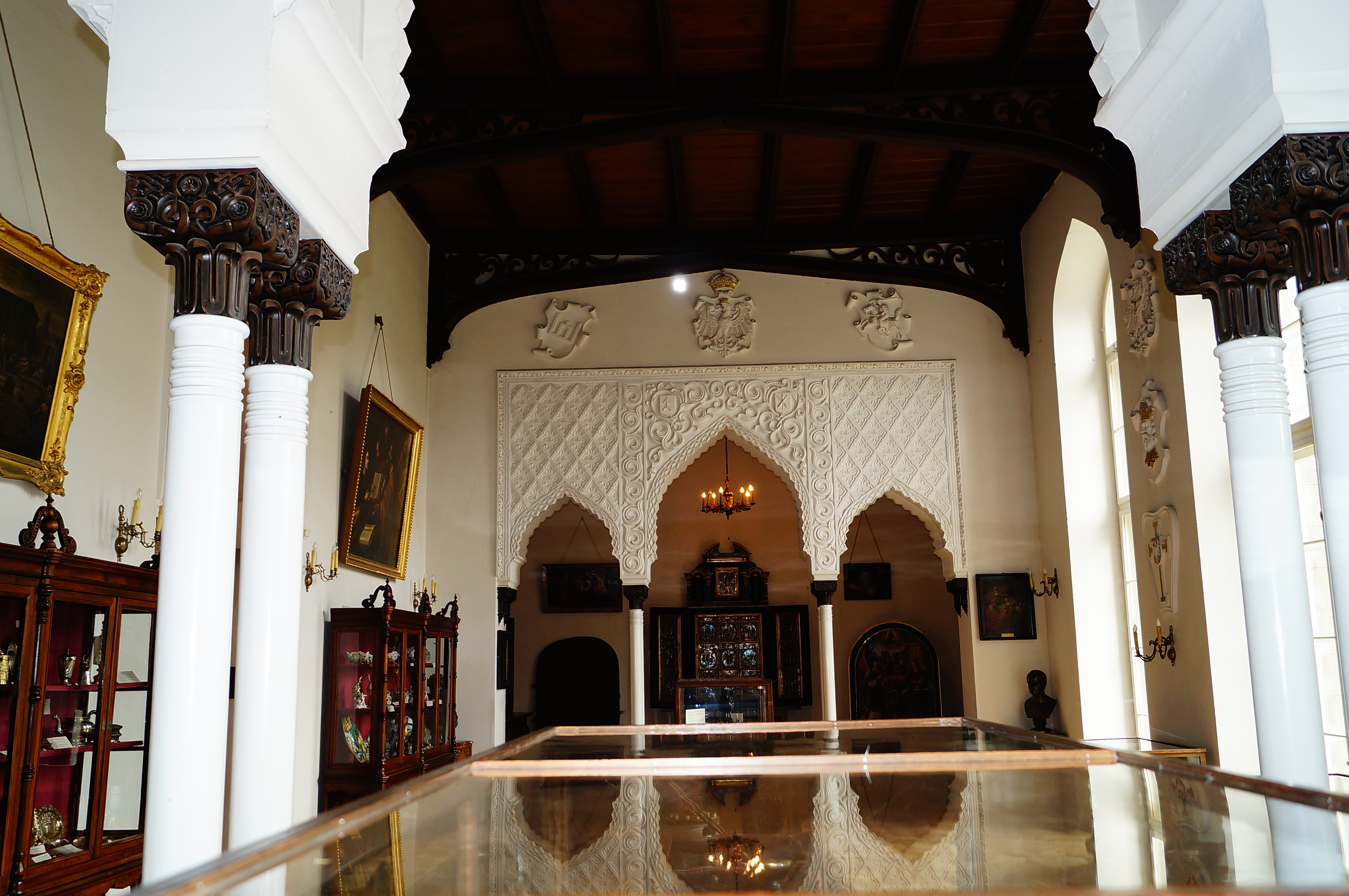
Castle interiors

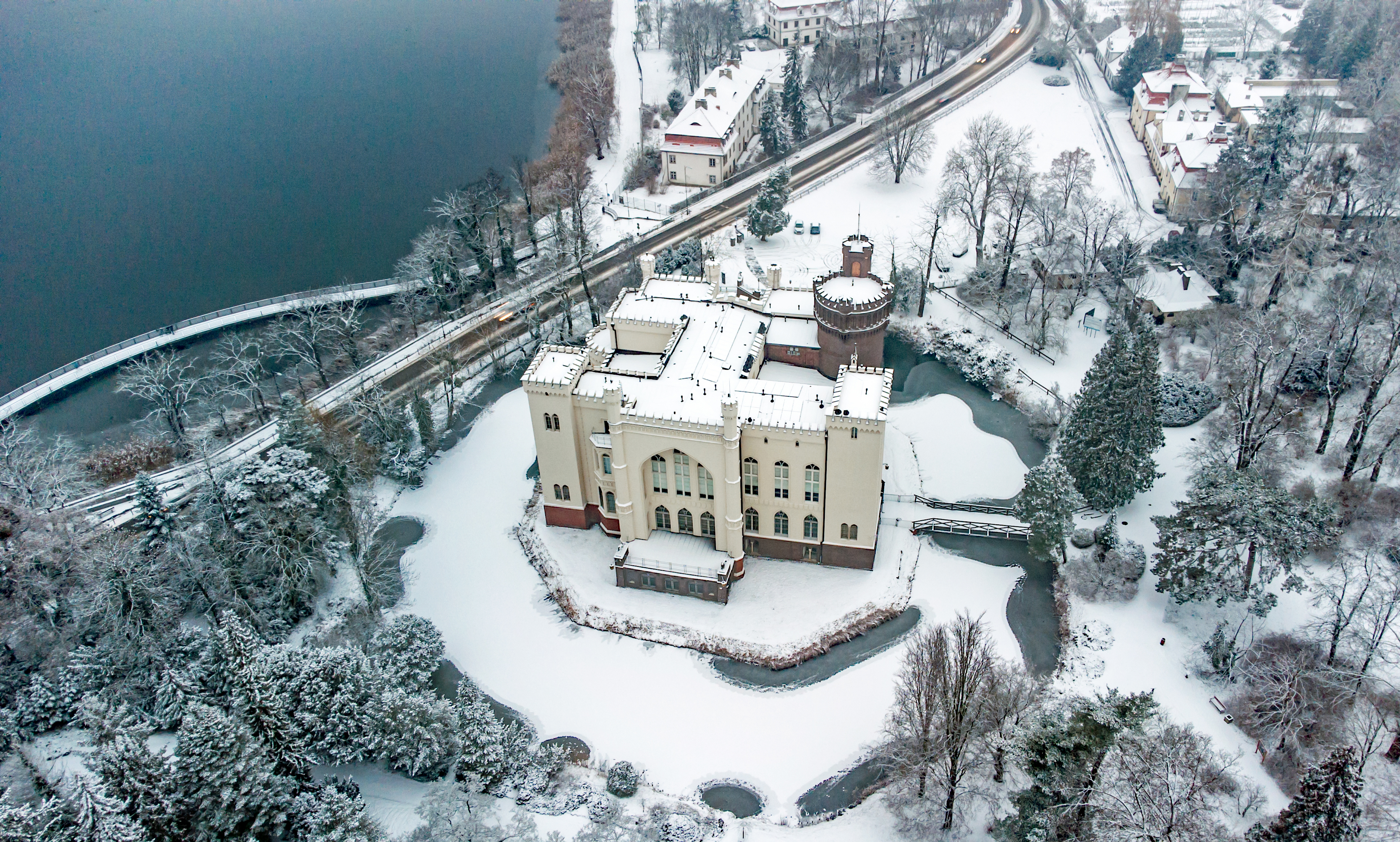
Aerial view

== See also ==
- All Saints' Church, Kórnik
- Castles in Poland
