= Clisson et Eugénie =

Romantic novella written by Napoleon

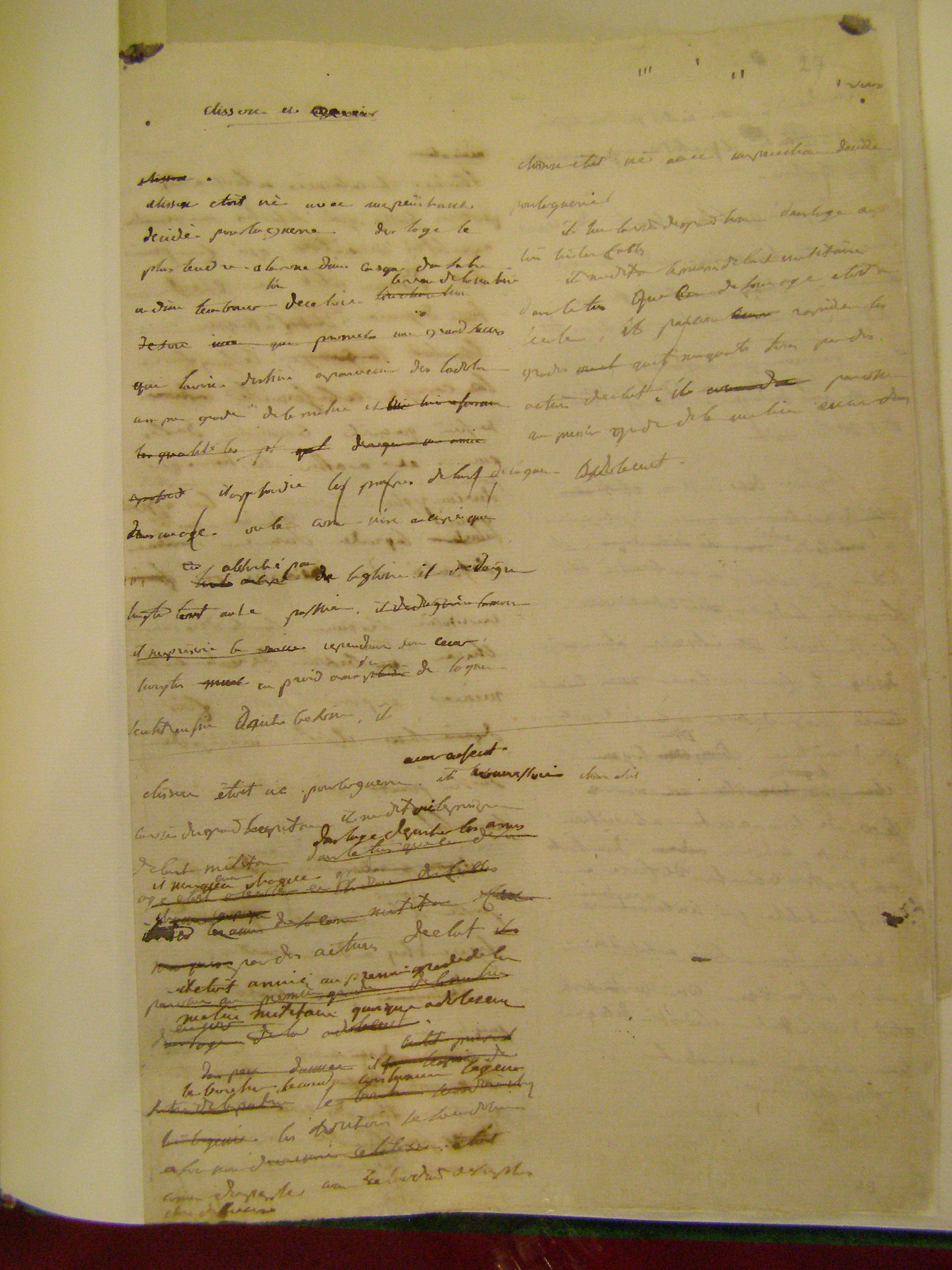
Manuscript of novella, Kórnik Castle

Clisson et Eugénie, also known in English as Clisson and Eugénie, is a romantic novella, written by Napoleon Bonaparte. Napoleon wrote Clisson et Eugénie in 1795, and it is widely acknowledged as being a fictionalised account of the doomed romance of a soldier and his lover, which paralleled Bonaparte's own relationship with Eugénie Désirée Clary.

== Synopsis ==
Clisson, a heroic revolutionary French soldier, but tired of war, meets and falls for Eugénie at a public bath. Retiring from the military, Clisson and Eugénie marry and raise several children within an idyllic countryside retreat, but war returns and Clisson feels compelled to serve his country. Unfortunately, Clisson is injured in battle and Berville, a comrade sent to reassure Eugénie, seduces her instead, and she stops sending Clisson letters. Heartbroken at the end of his marriage, Clisson then sends off one final letter to his unfaithful wife and her new lover before deliberately engineering his death at the front of an armed charge toward the enemy.

Some observers have claimed that Napoleon was influenced by the work of Jean-Jacques Rousseau, particularly La Nouvelle Héloïse (1761), and Goethe's The Sorrows of Young Werther (1774).

== Compilation of Clisson et Eugénie ==
Peter Hicks (a British historian) and Emilie Barthet compiled the current reconstructed and composite version of Clisson et Eugénie from multiple drafts. The manuscript had previously been unpublished, fragmented and dispersed. One fragment was in the possession of Étienne Soulange-Bodin, an expert horticulturalist at the Château de Malmaison, the final home of the Empress Joséphine, Napoleon's first wife. On 22 November 1821, it was then handed to a British francophile, residing in her or his collection until it was then purchased at an auction in Sotheby's, London, in July 1938. Its purchaser, Hermann Eisemann, then onsold it in New York, leading to its ownership by a Cuban national, Julio Lobo. In 2005, it reappeared amidst the collection of an Italian autograph dealer, Fausto Foroni. This segment of the manuscript was unpublished until its rediscovery, compilation and publication.

A second fragment resided within the collection of Count Tytus Działyński, a Polish bibliophile, containing forty pages of folio manuscript in Napoleon's handwriting. It was authenticated by Napoleon's personal staff when he was given the second segment in May 1822. This segment was finally published for the first time in 1920 and several times thereafter.

A third section consisted of four pages, exchanged amongst antiquarians and manuscript collectors within London early last century. British property developer and socialist Howard Samuel purchased the pages for two thousand three hundred pounds in 1955. These pages are now housed in the Karpeles Manuscript Library Museum in Santa Barbara, California.

A fourth segment was originally acquired by Count Grigoriy Vladimirovich Orlov (1726-1826) in December 1823. It now resides in Moscow's State Historical Museum. Count Orlov had spent time in France and was associated with the favourites of Tsarina Catherine the Great during this period. This fourth fragment was published by Fayard in France for the first time in 2007.

Hicks identified the fifth section of the manuscript as the opening page of Clisson et Eugénie. It had previously belonged to French financier Andre de Coppet, who amassed a considerable collection of Napoleonic memorabilia. In December 2007, it was auctioned off to a private French collector. The sixth and final fragment of the text consisted of four pages that had become detached from the Orlov fragment at the State Historical Museum in Moscow. Altogether, Napoleon appears to have made five attempts at writing the story, judging from the number of extant prior handwritten manuscripts.

== English translation and republication ==
A translation of Clisson et Eugénie by Christopher Frayling was published in 1972.

In 2009, it was noted that British publishers Gallic Books had purchased the English-language rights to Clisson et Eugénie, edited by Peter Hicks during 2008. In December 2007, Hicks had discovered a missing section of Napoleon's novella and he then compiled multiple drafts of the work into a "definitive" edition. It also has an introduction from Armand Cabasson, a French historical fiction author who specialises in Napoleonic period murder and criminal fiction novels.
