= Działyński =

Coat of Arms of the Counts Działyński

The House of Działyński was a Polish noble family whose name comes from their original place of settlement, Działyń in Dobrzyń Land. Members of the family held the tile of Count and used the Ogończyk coat of arms.

== History ==
The original head of the family was Piotr from Działyń (died 1441). During the 16th century the members of the Działyński family began moving from Kujawy into Royal Prussia. Their connections with the court of the King of Poland allowed them to quickly acquire senatorial positions in the Prussian Diet on the Prussian side of the family (the family had sixteen Prussian senators between the 15th and 18th centuries). In the second half of the 17th century some members began moving to Wielkopolska and over time this became the dominant line of the family. The last male member of the family, Count Jan Kanty Działyński died in 1880.

== Notable members ==
- Jan Działyński (1489–1587) – Stolnik of Dobrzyń, Castellan of Słońsk
- Jan Działyński (1510–1583) – voivode of Chełm, Chamberlain of Gdańsk, Elbląg and Chełm
- Paweł Działyński (1560–1609) – Polish courtier, royal secretary, ambassador and governor of Bobrowniki and Radziejów.
- Jan Działyński (1590–1648) - voivode of Chełm, Starosta of Puck
- Paweł Jan Działyński (1594–1643) – voivode of Pomorze
- Jan Działyński (?–1692) – Castellan of Elbląg
- Ignacy Działyński (1754–1797) – Polish nobleman and participant in the Warsaw Uprising of 1794
- Augustyn Działyński (1715–1759) – voivode of Kalisz, cavalier of the Order of the White Eagle
- Ksawery Szymon Tadeusz Działyński (1756–1819) – senator and voivode of Duchy of Warsaw and Congress Poland
- Adam Tytus Działyński (1796–1861) – political activist and sponsor of the arts
- Jan Kanty Działyński (1829–1880) – Polish social and political activist

== Gallery ==
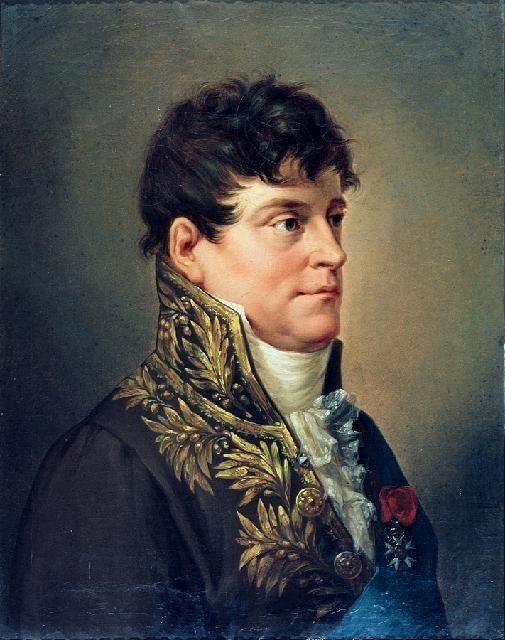
Ksawery Działyński

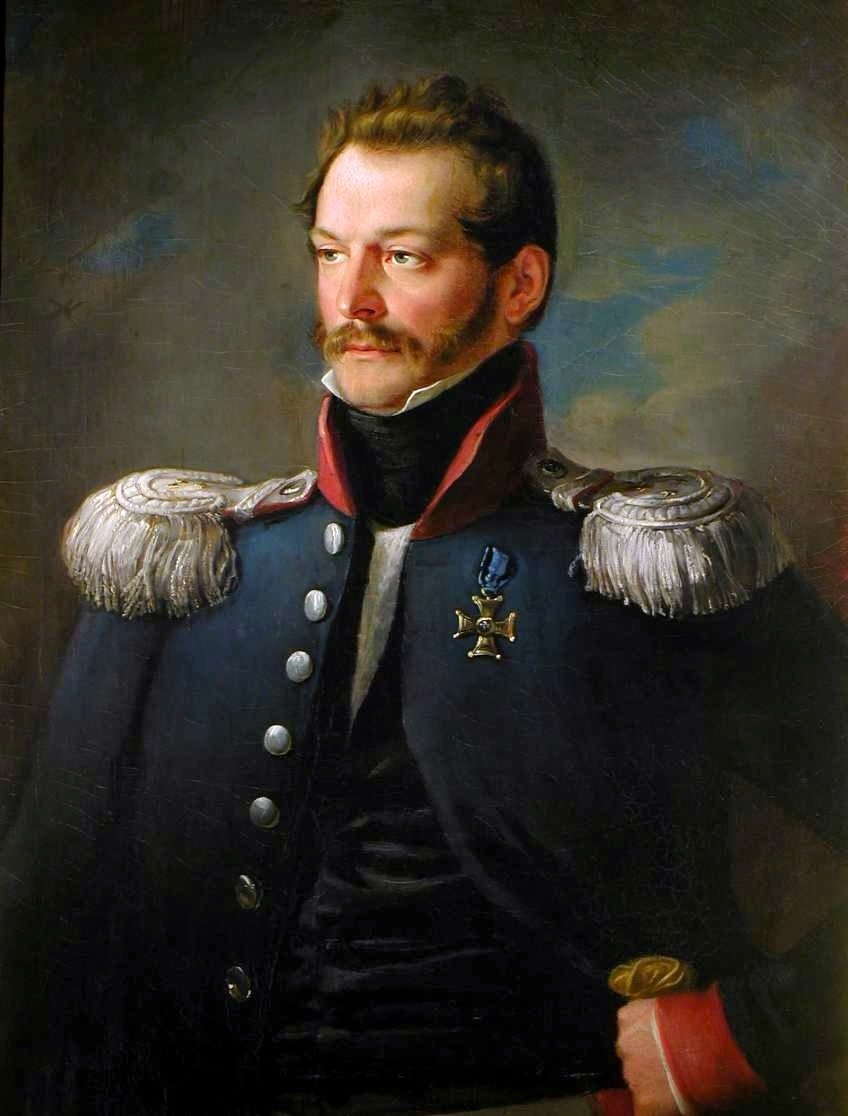
Tytus Działyński

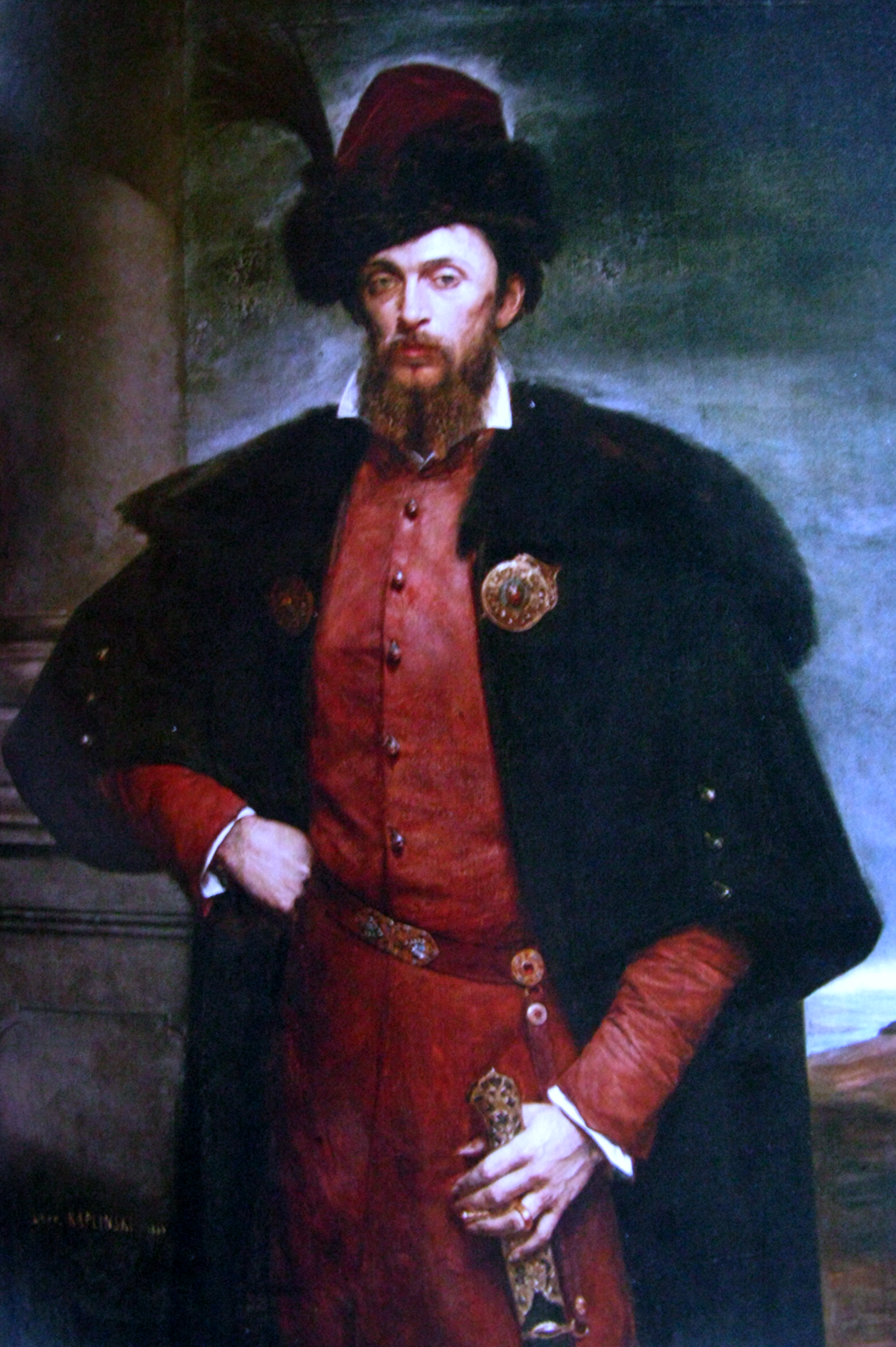
Jan Kanty Działyński

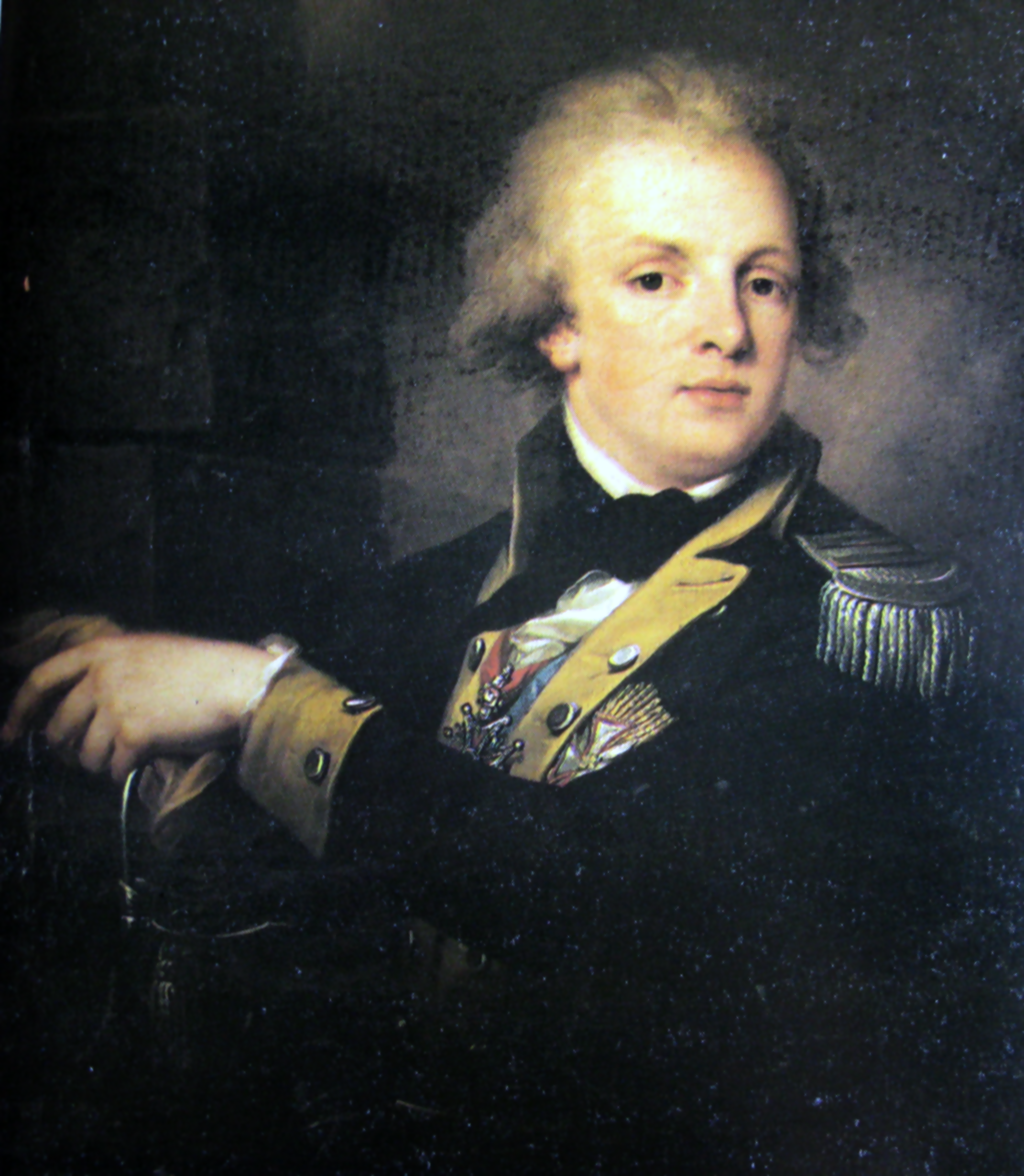
Ignacy Działyński

== Palaces ==
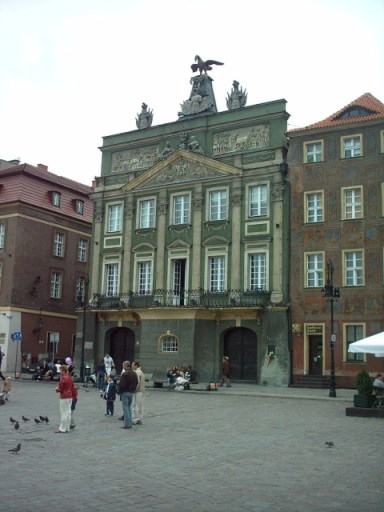
Działyński Palace in Poznań

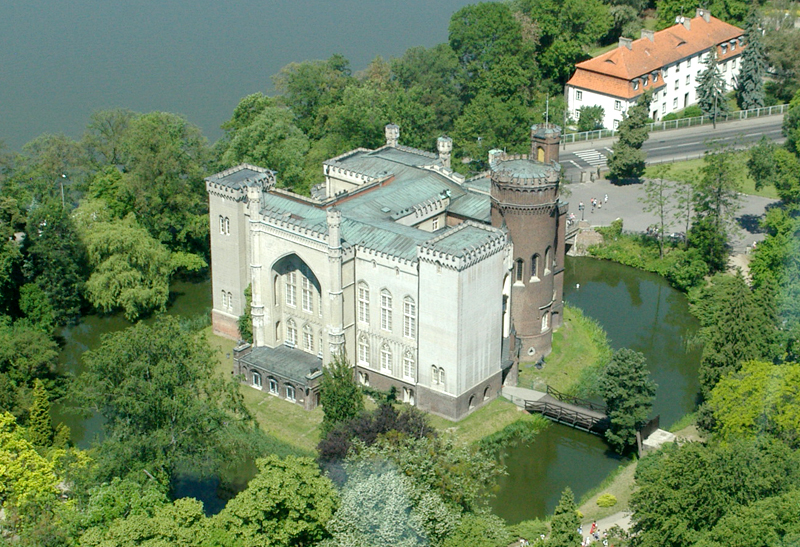
Kórnik Castle

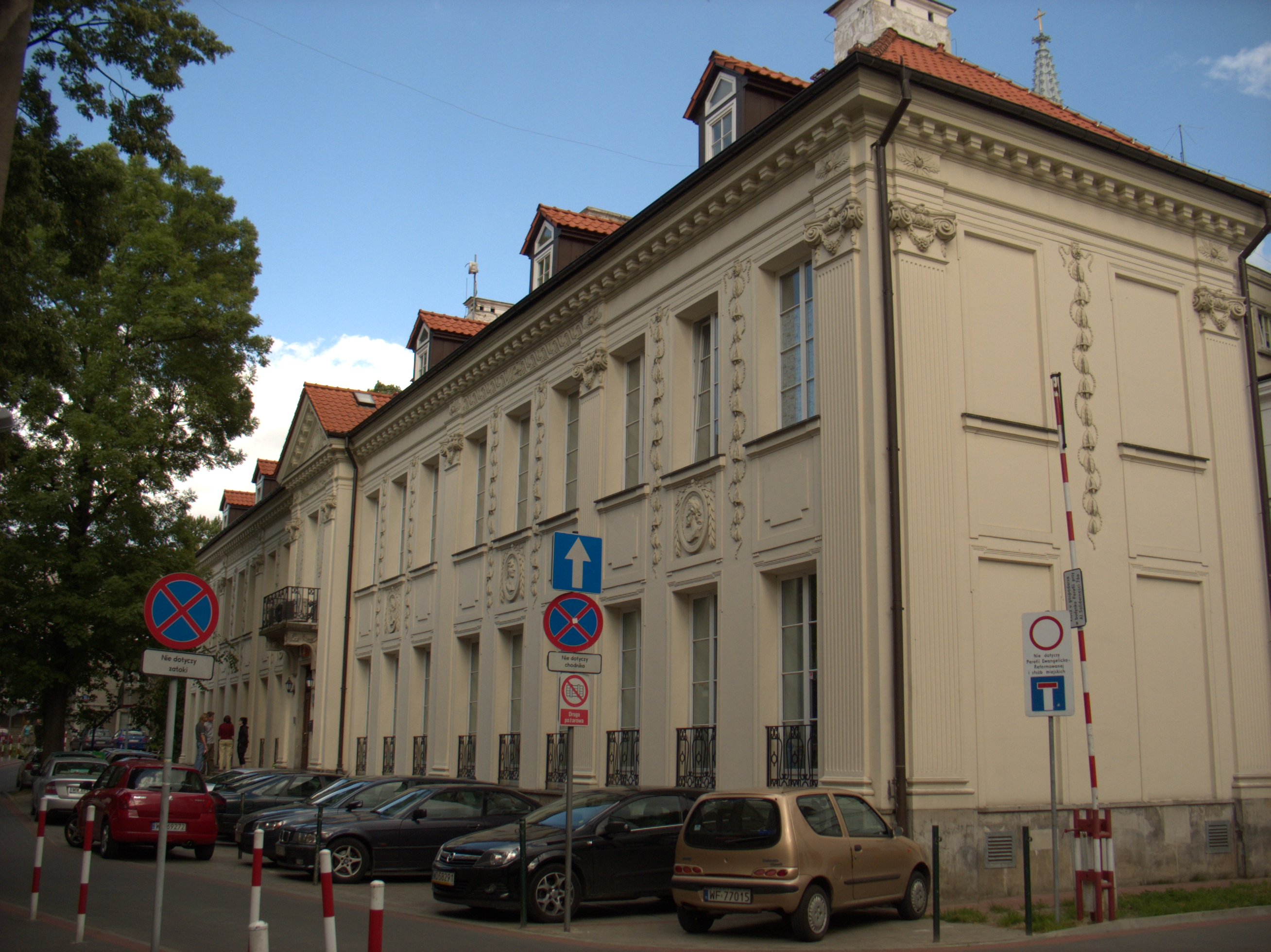
Dzialinsky Palace (Warsaw) in Warsaw

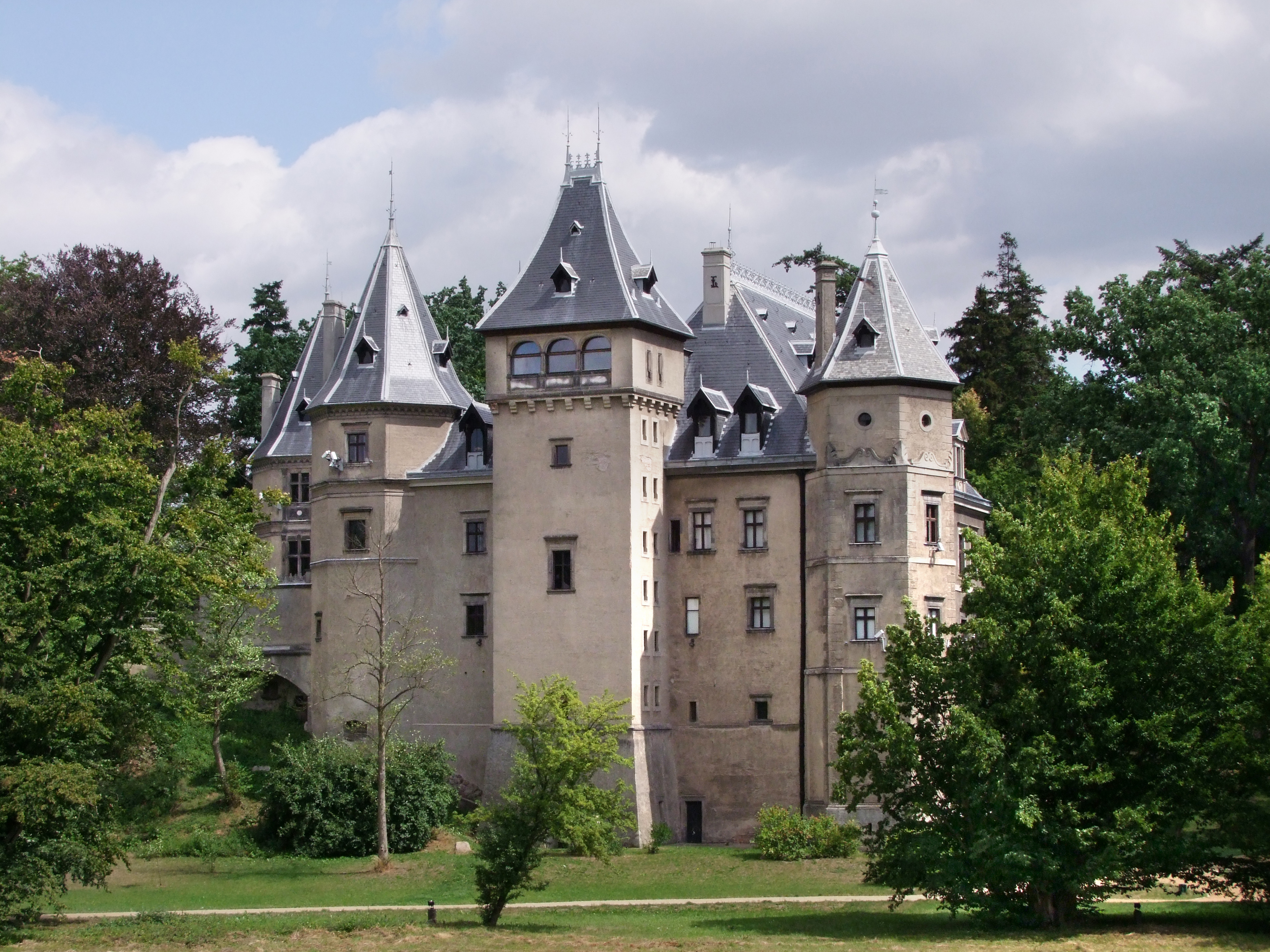
Castle in Gołuchów, purchased by Tytus Dzialynski
