= Tytus Działyński =

Polish politician (1796–1861)

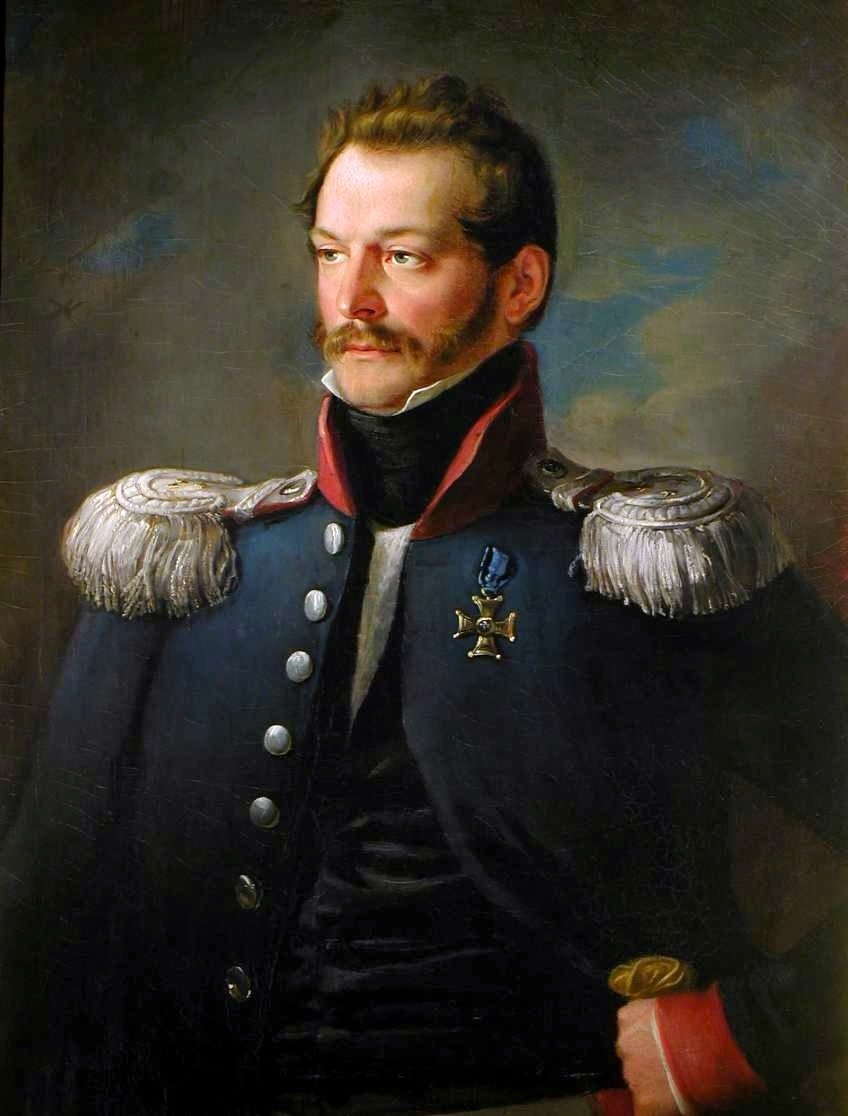
Portrait by an unknown artist, c. 1831

Count Tytus Adam Działyński (1796–1861, son of Ksawery, father to Jan Kanty) was a Polish nobleman, political activist and protector of arts and a Prussian politician.

== Biography ==
Tytus was born into the rich and influential Polish noble House of Działyński, as the son of Count Ksawery Działyński (1756-1819) and his wife, Countess Justyna Dzieduszycka (1764-1844). He was a publisher of historical sources important for the Polish history, founder of Kórnik Library (Biblioteka Kórnicka), co-founder of Poznań Industrial Society (Towarzystwo Przemysłowe w Poznaniu), the Poznań Society of Friends of Arts and Sciences (Poznańskie Towarzystwo Przyjaciół Nauk) and the president of the latter since 1858. He was also a participant of the November Uprising (1830/31) and Spring of Nations (1848). He was also a member of provincial parliament of the Grand Duchy of Poznan (1841-1846) and of the Prussian House of Representatives (1851-1853, 1858-1861). He was married to Countess Celestyna Gryzelda Zamoyska (1804-1883) and had six children, one son and five daughters.

== Death ==
Count Tytus Adam Działyński died in Poznań, on 12 April 1861, at the age of 63. His body was transferred and buried in Kórnik Castle, Kórnik, Poland.

== Publications ==
- The Lithianian Statute (Statut litewski, 1841)
- Źródłopisma do dziejów unii Korony Polskiej i Wielkiego Księstwa Litewskiego (1856–61) Sources to the history of union of the Crown of Poland and the Grand Duchy of Lithuania
- Acta Tomiciana (vol. 1–8, 1852–60).
