= Moskalik =

Moskalik may refer to:

- Moskalik (fish)
- Moskalik (surname)
- Moskalik (poetry)
