= Kórnik =

Town in Greater Poland Voivodeship, Poland

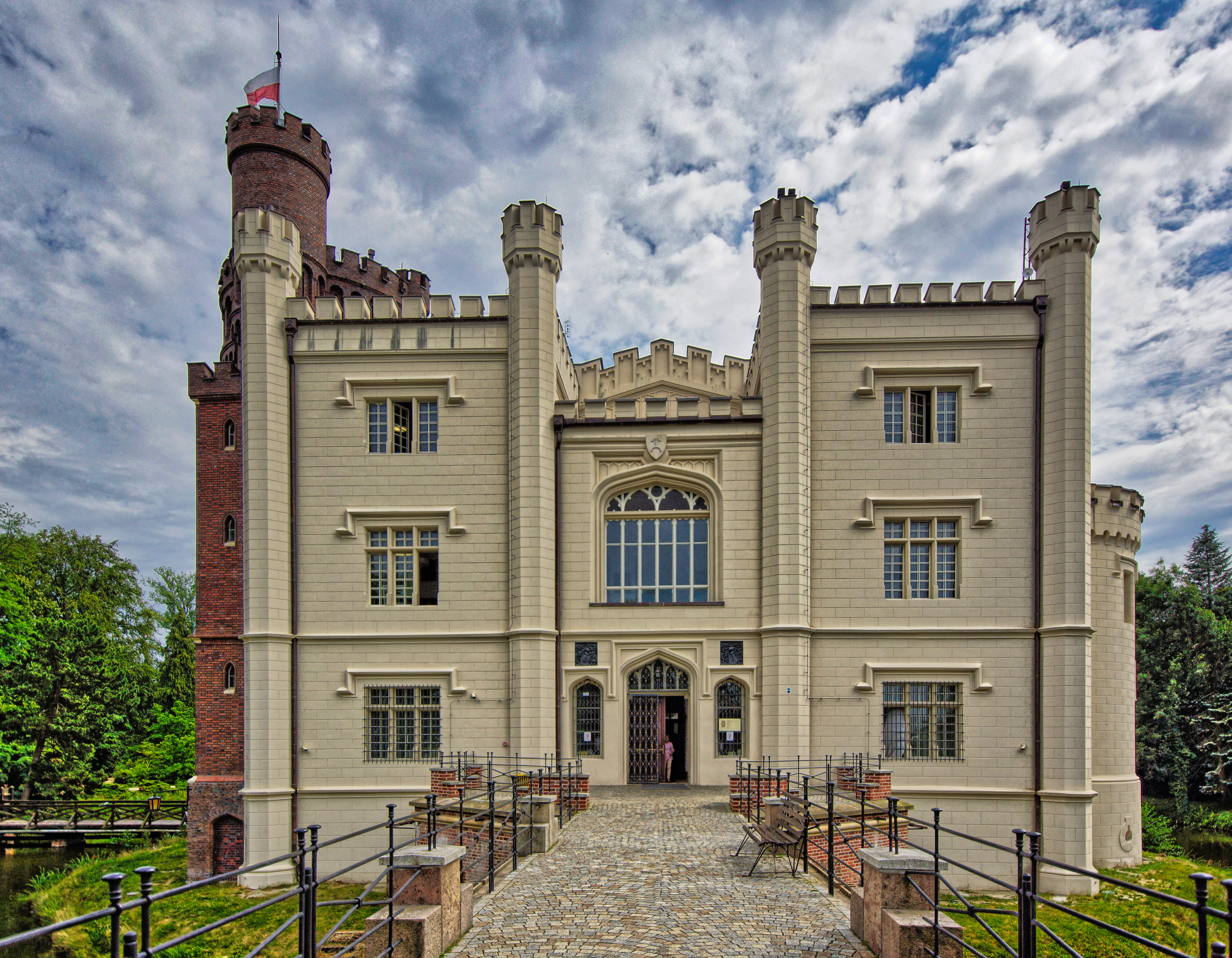
- Kórnik Castle

- Coat of arms

- Location within Poland
- Coordinates: 52°14′12″N 17°5′55″E
- Country: Poland
- Voivodeship: Greater Poland
- County: Poznań
- Gmina: Kórnik

Area
  - Total: 6.08 km^{2} (2.35 sq mi)

Population (2022)
  - Total: 9,931
  - Density: 1,630/km^{2} (4,230/sq mi)
- Time zone: UTC+1 (CET)
  - Summer (DST): UTC+2 (CEST)
- Postal code: 62-035
- Vehicle registration: POZ, PZ
- Climate: Cfb
- Primary airport: Poznań–Ławica Airport
- Website: http://www.kornik.pl

Kórnik [ˈkurɲik] is a town with about 7,600 inhabitants (2018), located in western Poland, about 25 kilometres (16 mi) south-east of the city of Poznań. It is one of the major tourist attractions of the Wielkopolska region and the Greater Poland Voivodeship because of the historical castle and arboretum, which is amongst the oldest and richest collections of trees and shrubs in Poland, and one of Europe's largest arboretums.

== History ==
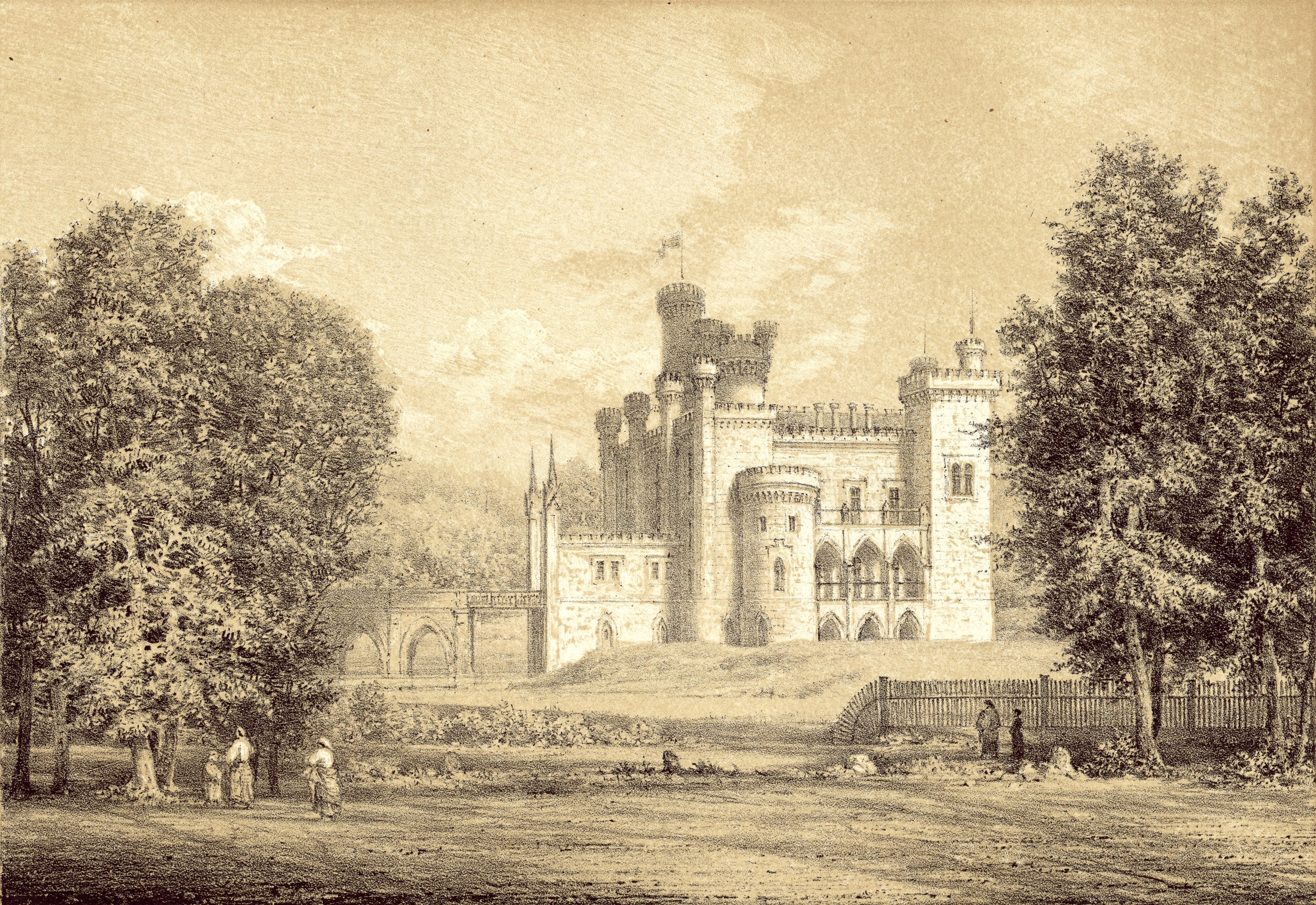
19th-century print of the castle by Napoleon Orda

Until 1961 Kórnik was separate from Bnin, situated just 1 km apart. Both towns were founded in the Middle Ages (Bnin gained town rights in 1395, and Kórnik in 1426), but Bnin lost its town rights in 1934, and in 1961 it became part of Kórnik. The enlarged town also includes the former settlement of Prowent, birthplace of the Nobel Prize-winning poet Wisława Szymborska.

Mieszko I of Poland founded an early Polish stronghold in present-day Bnin in the 10th century. Kórnik was first mentioned in documents in the 12th century, while the town of Bnin started to develop in the 13th century, and a castellany was located in Bnin since 1232. After granting town rights, both Kórnik and Bnin were private towns of Polish nobility, administratively located in the Pyzdry County in the Kalisz Voivodeship in the Greater Poland Province. Kórnik was initially owned by the Górka family until 1592. The Łodzia coat of arms of the Górka family is the coat of arms of Kórnik since. Afterwards the town was held by the Czarnkowski, Grudziński and Działyński families.

On 11 November 1918, an infantry company, which later became part of the Polish 69th Infantry Regiment, was founded in Kórnik. On 27 December, the company left Kórnik to aid Polish insurgents in Poznań.

=== World War II ===
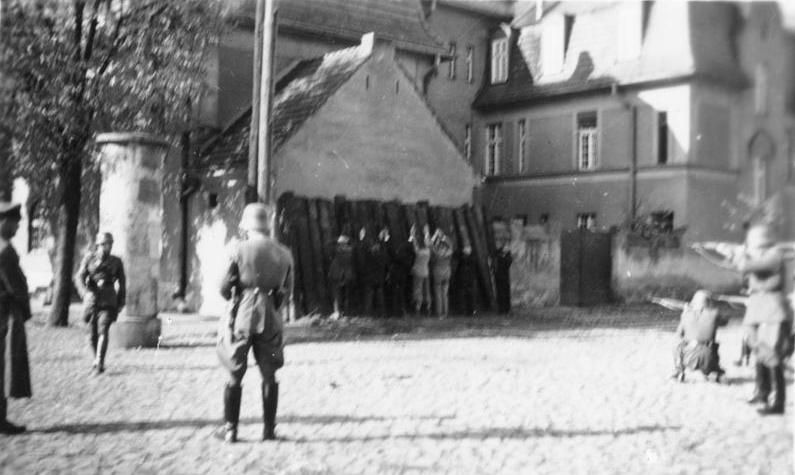
Public execution of Polish civilians carried out by the Einsatzgruppe VI on 20 October 1939

After the German-Soviet invasion of Poland, which started World War II in September 1939, the town was occupied and annexed by Nazi Germany from 1939 to 1945 as part of Landkreis Schrimm, Reichsgau Wartheland. It was renamed Burgstadt in attempt to erase traces of Polish origin.

Already on 27 September 1939 the Germans confiscated and robbed the rich museum and library of the Kórnik Castle. On 20 October 1939, the German Einsatzgruppe VI carried out a public execution of 16 Poles at the Market Square as part of Operation Tannenberg. Among the victims was pre-war mayor Teofil Wolniewicz. Inhabitants of Kórnik were also among 15 Poles murdered on the same day in a public execution in nearby Mosina. The purpose of the executions was to pacify and terrorize Poles. Nevertheless, the Polish resistance movement was still organized in the town. Polish underground press was printed in Kórnik. Local teachers were also among Polish teachers murdered in the Mauthausen concentration camp. Deputy mayor Jan Hanelt was murdered by the Russians in Kharkiv in the Katyn massacre in 1940.

== Sights ==
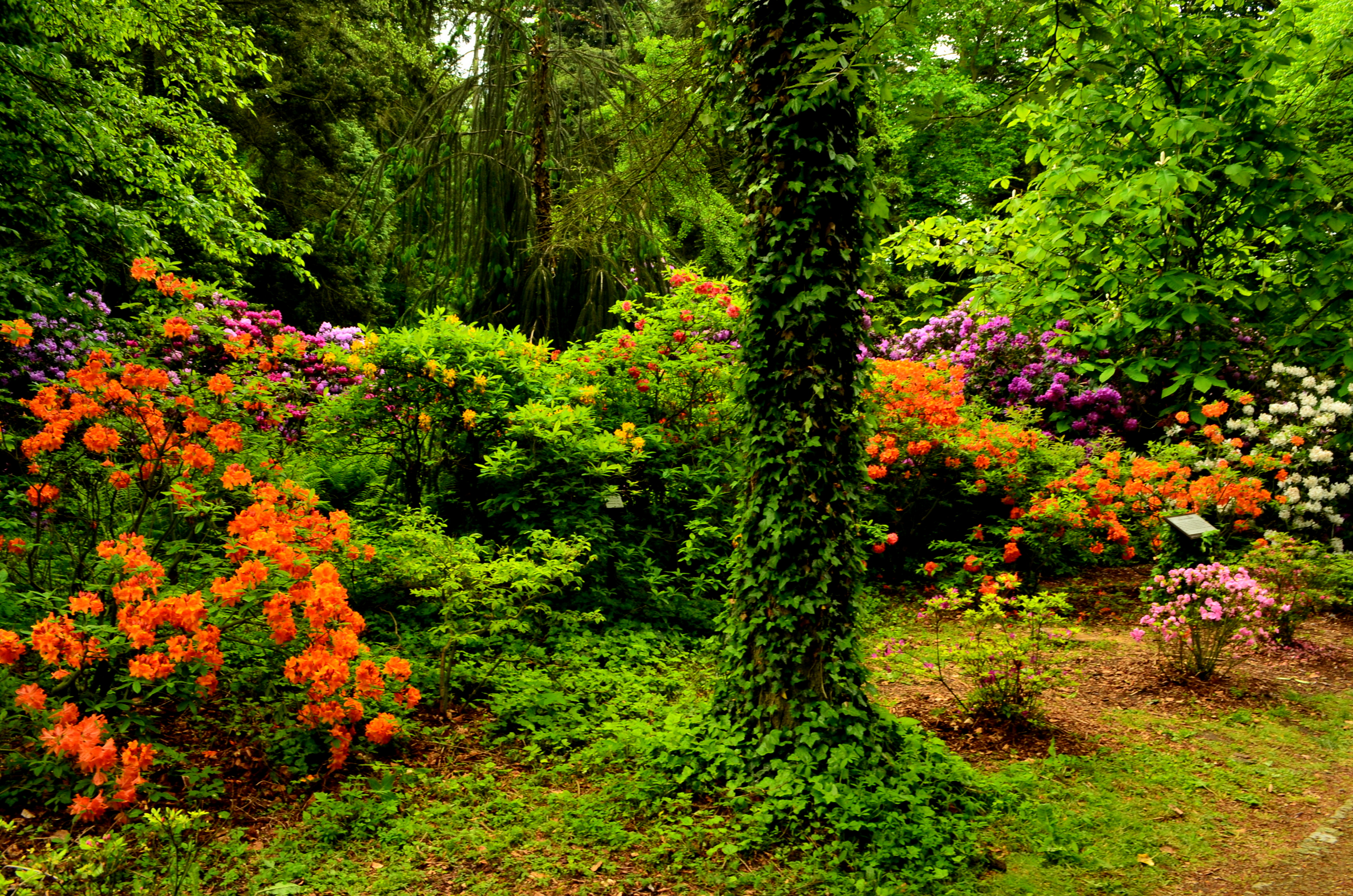
Rhododendrons in the Kórnik Arboretum

The town's notable sites include:

- Kórnik Castle, built in the 14th century, but designed and rebuilt in the 18th century in neo-Gothic style by architect Karl Friedrich Schinkel for the Działyński family.
- Kórnik Arboretum, established in the early 19th century by Count Tytus Działyński, later enriched with new species and varieties by his heirs, his son Jan Kanty Działyński and grandson Władysław Zamoyski. It is the largest and oldest arboretum in Poland and fourth largest arboretum in Europe, with over 3300 taxa of trees and shrubs.
- Town halls of both Kórnik and Bnin. That of Kornik was built in 1907 as a neo-Baroque city hall; Bnin's is a piece of original 18th-century late Baroque architecture.
- Kórnik Library (Bibliotheca Cornicensis), one of the most famous Polish libraries, founded by Tytus Działyński in 1828. Currently the library, despite being looted by the German Nazis during World War II, is one of the five largest libraries in Poland and contains roughly 400,000 volumes, including 30,000 books more than 150 years old, and 14,000 manuscripts. Since 1953 it has been a part of the National Library of Poland.

== Transport ==
The S11 Expressway bypasses Kórnik to the east. Kórnik Północ and Kórnik Południe exits provide access to the town.

Kórnik has a station on the Poznań-Katowice railway line.

Buses link Kórnik to Poznań.

The nearest airport is Poznań-Ławica Airport.

== Sports ==
The local football club is Kotwica Kórnik. It competes in the lower leagues.

== International relations ==
=== Twin towns — Sister cities ===
Kórnik is twinned with:

- Königstein im Taunus, Germany
- Uman, Ukraine

== Distinguished residents ==
- Edmund Zalinski (1849–1909), American military engineer and inventor
- Wisława Szymborska (1923–2012), Nobel Prize-winning poet
- Mateusz Taciak (born 1984), racing cyclist

== Gallery ==
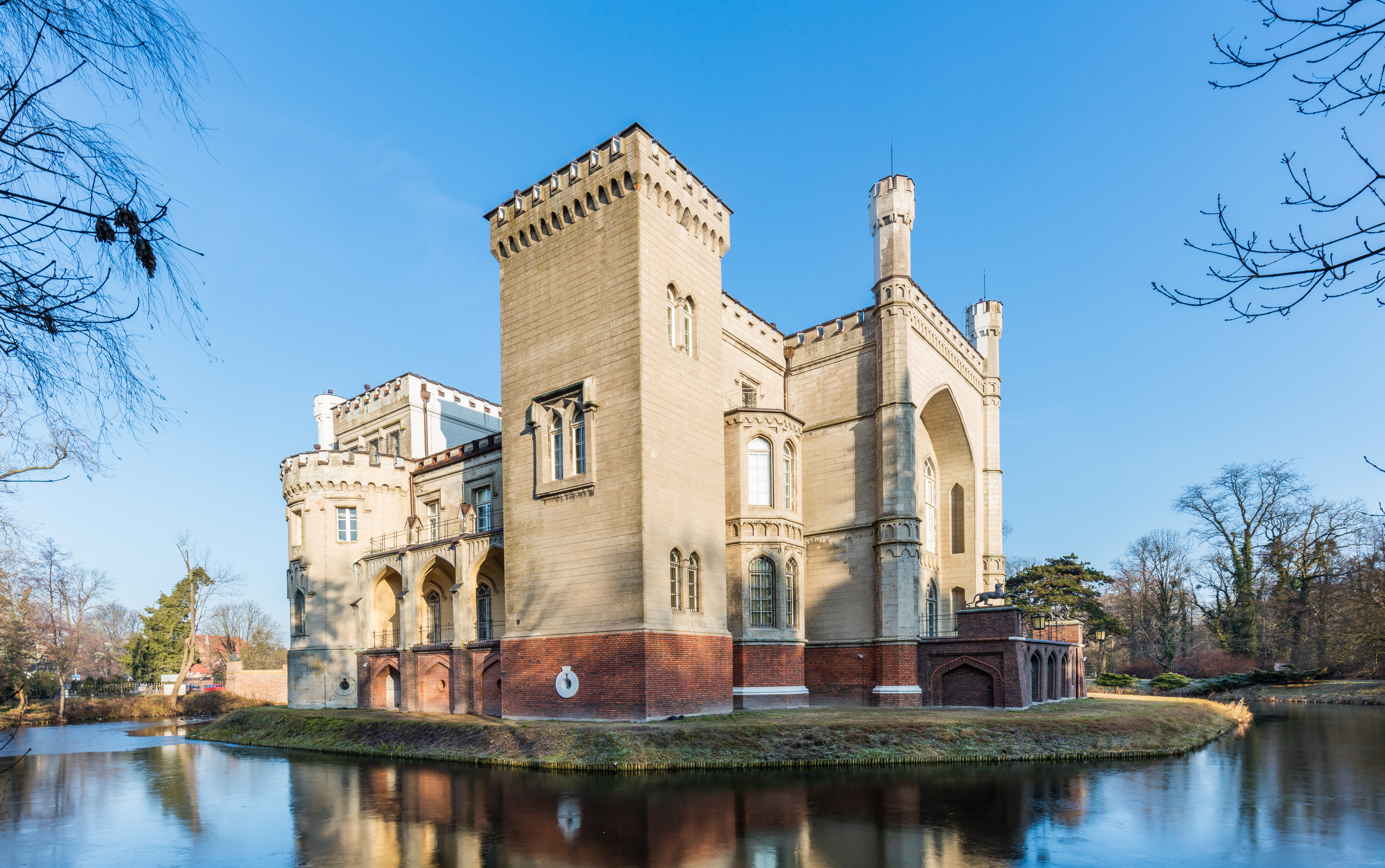
Kórnik Castle and its moat

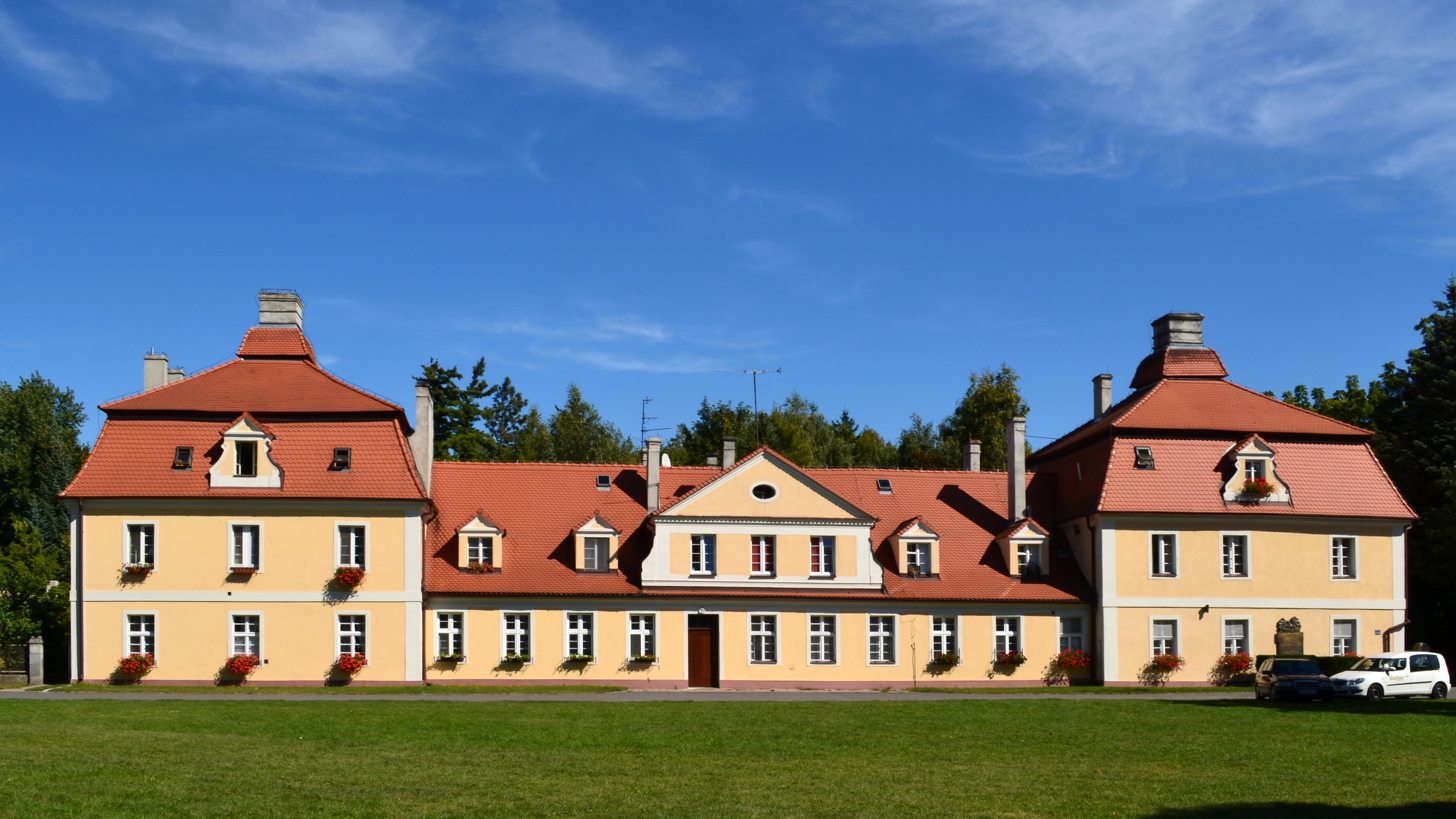
One of the Kórnik Castle outbuildings

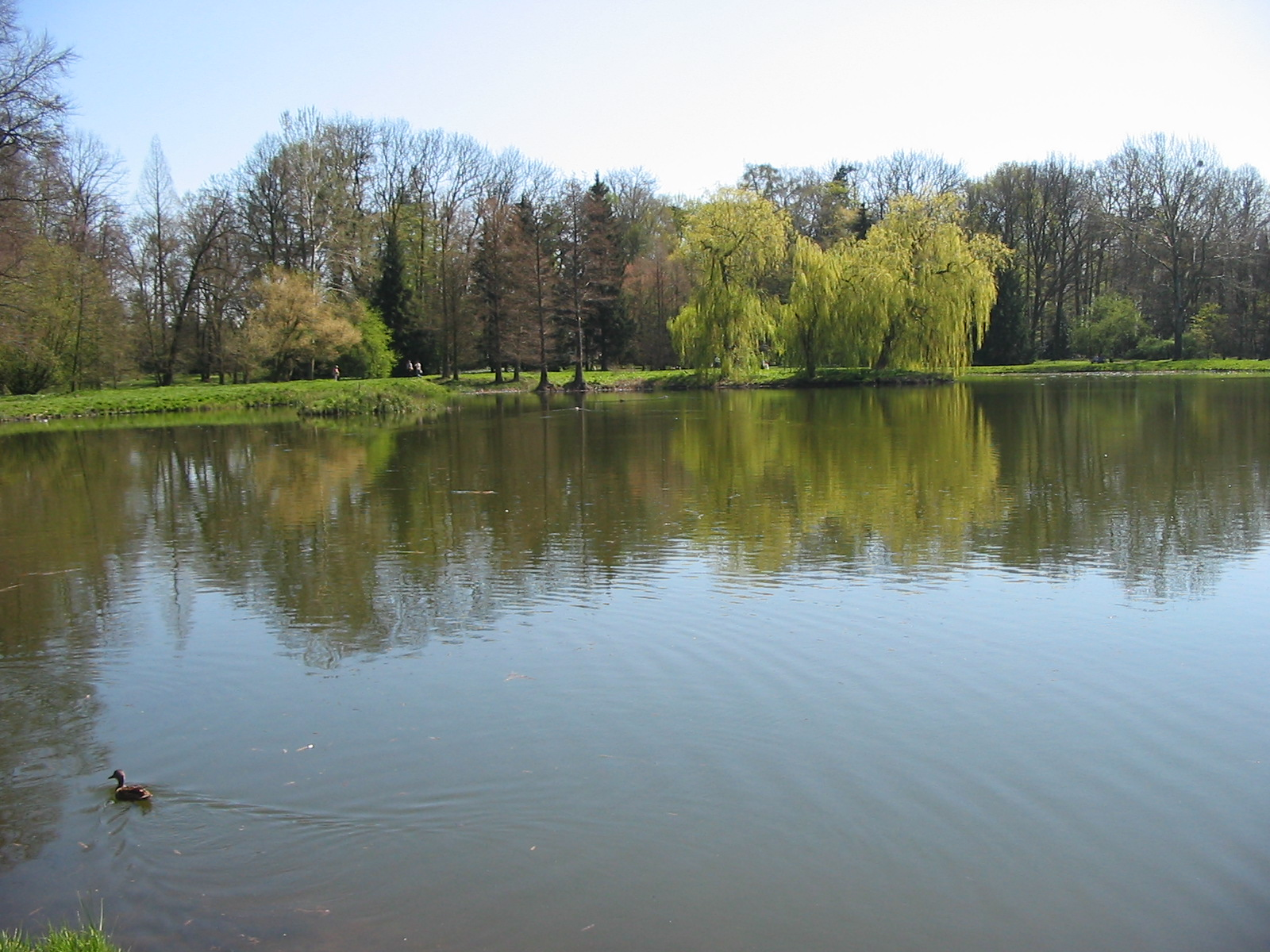
A pond in the arboretum next to the castle

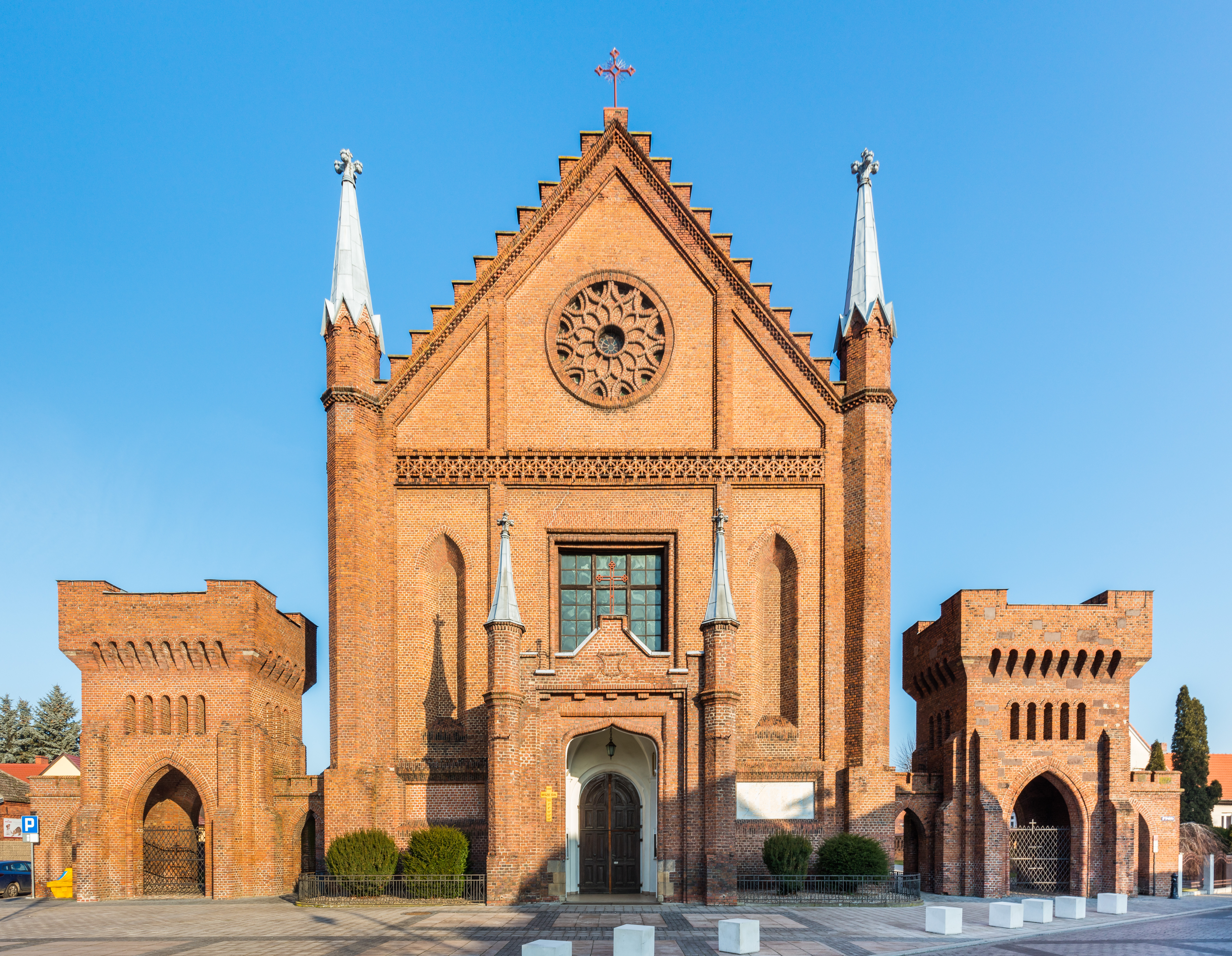
All Saints' Church

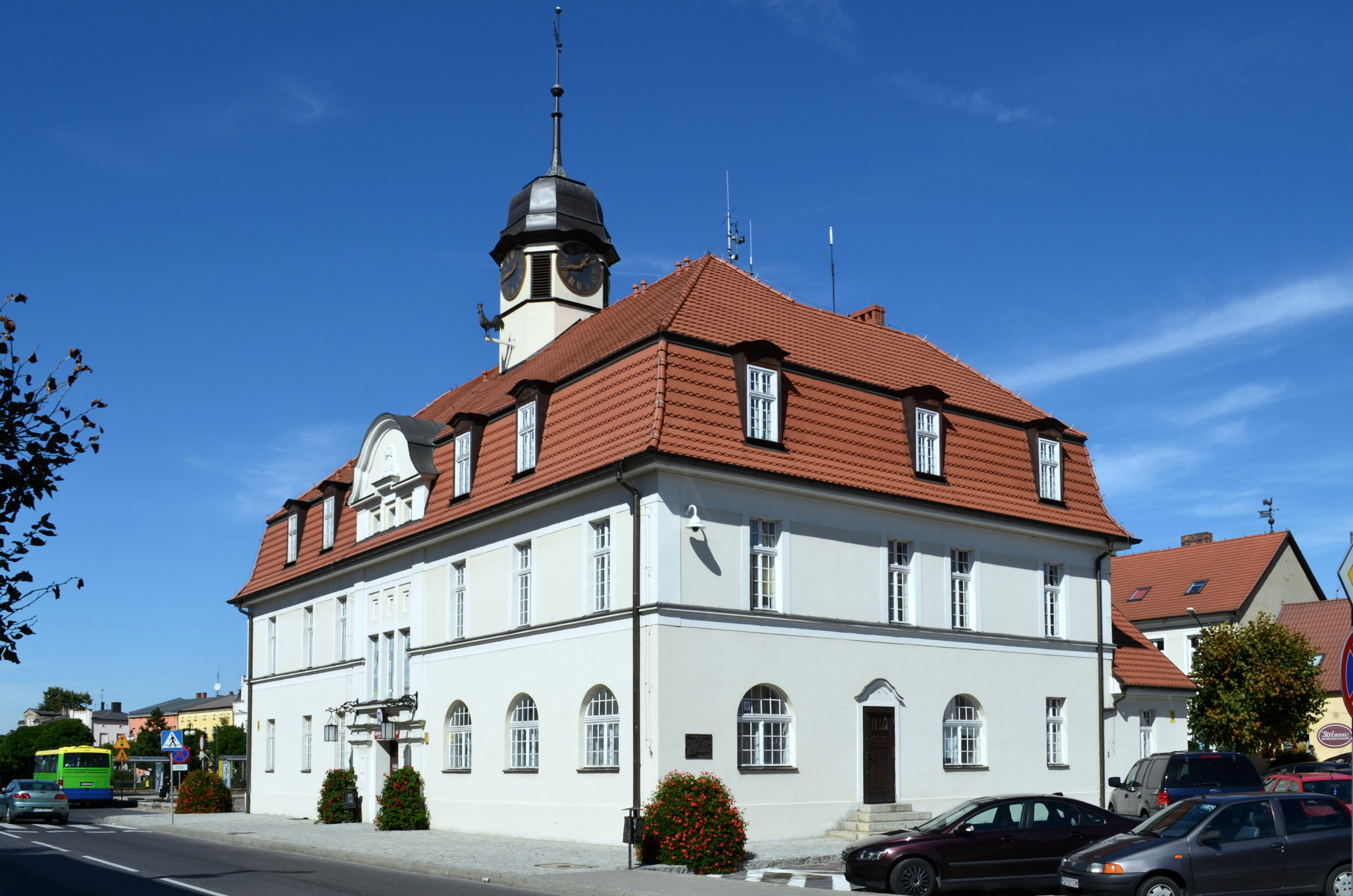
Town hall

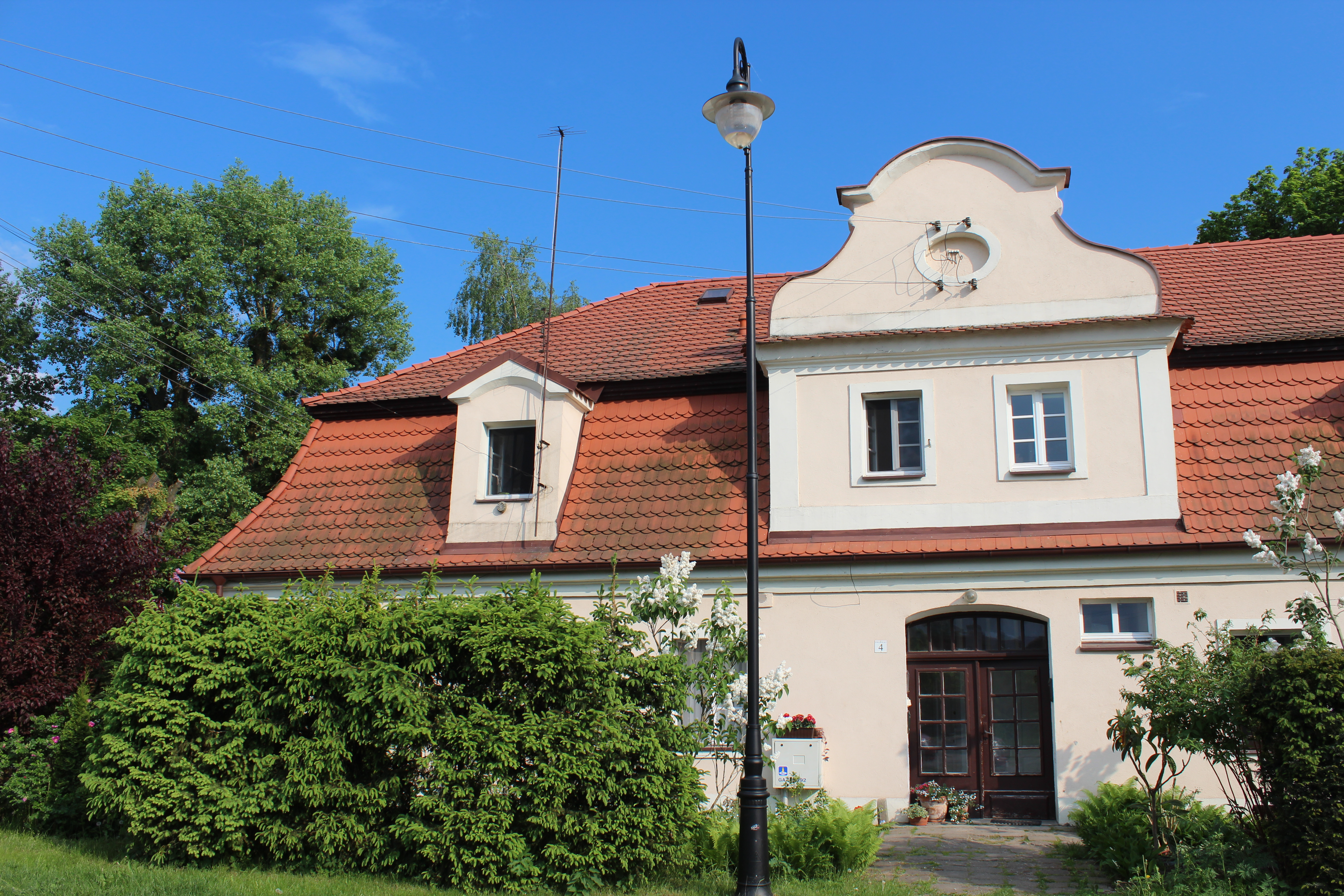
Birthplace of Wisława Szymborska
