= Wisława Szymborska =

Polish poet and Nobel laureate (1923–2012)

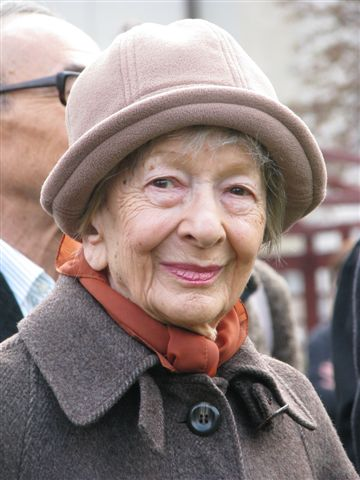
- Szymborska in Kraków, 2009
- Born: Maria Wisława Anna Szymborska; 2 July 1923; Prowent, Poznań Voivodeship, Poland
- Died: 1 February 2012 (aged 88); Kraków, Poland
- Occupations: Poet; essayist; translator
- Writing career
- Notable awards: Goethe Prize (1991); Herder Prize (1995); Nobel Prize in Literature (1996); Order of the White Eagle (2011)

Maria Wisława Anna Szymborska (Polish: [viˈswava ʂɨmˈbɔrska]; 2 July 1923 – 1 February 2012) was a Polish poet, essayist, translator, and recipient of the 1996 Nobel Prize in Literature. Born in Prowent (now part of Kórnik in west-central Poland), she resided in Kraków until the end of her life. In Poland, Szymborska's books have reached sales rivaling prominent prose authors, though she wrote in a poem, "Some Like Poetry" ("Niektórzy lubią poezję"), that "perhaps" two in a thousand people like poetry.

Szymborska was awarded the 1996 Nobel Prize in Literature "for poetry that with ironic precision allows the historical and biological context to come to light in fragments of human reality". She became better known internationally as a result. Her work has been translated into many European languages, as well as into Arabic, Hebrew, Japanese, Persian and Chinese.

== Life ==
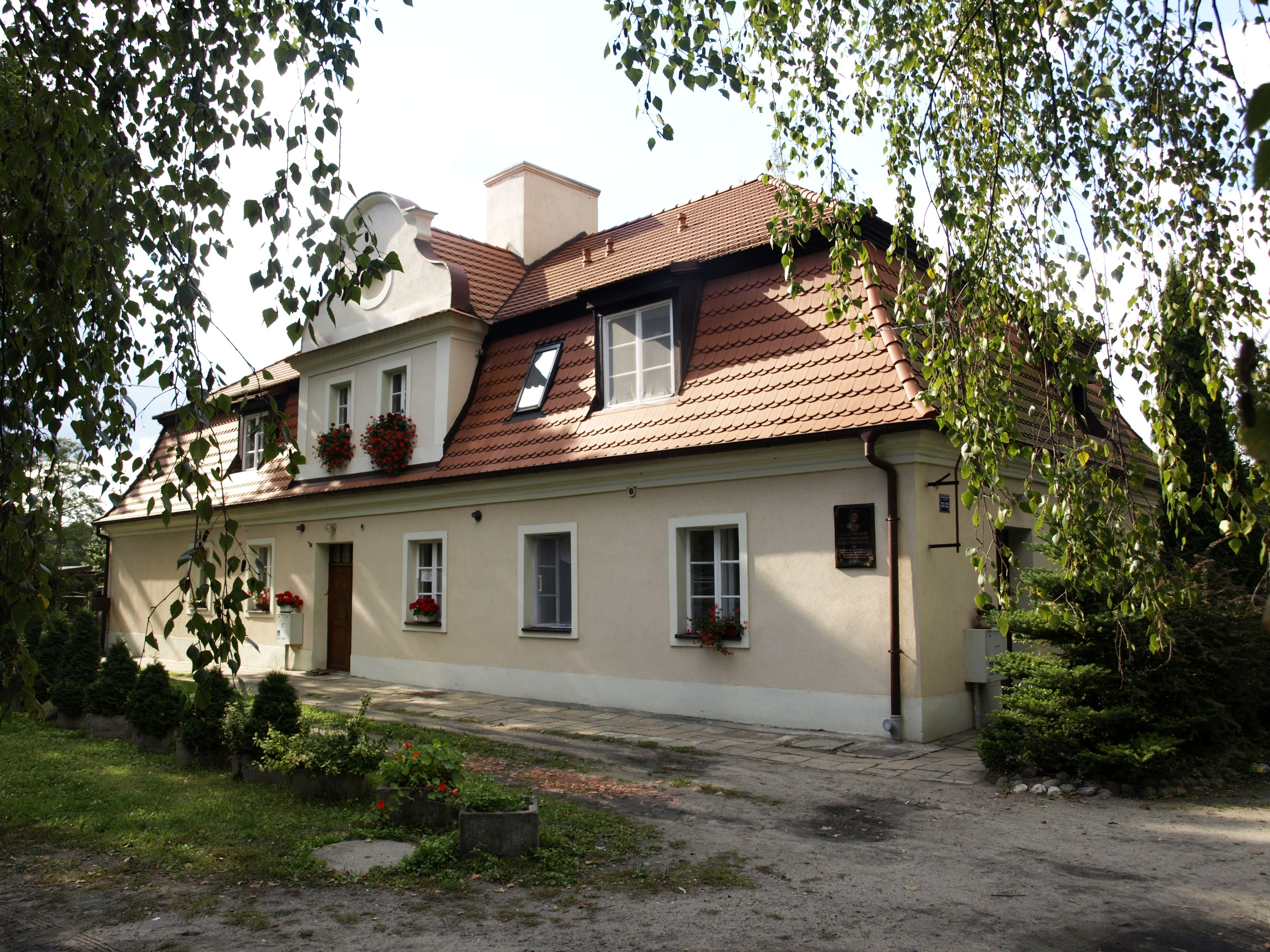
The house where Wisława Szymborska was born, in Prowent, now part of Kórnik, Poland

Wisława Szymborska was born on 2 July 1923 in Prowent, the second daughter of Wincenty Szymborski and Anna (née Rottermund) Szymborska. Her father was, at that time, the steward of Count Władysław Zamoyski, a Polish patriot and charitable patron. After Zamoyski's death in 1924, her family moved to Toruń, and in 1931 to Kraków, where she lived and worked until her death in early 2012.

When World War II broke out in 1939, she continued her education in underground classes. From 1943, she worked as a railroad employee and managed to avoid being deported to Germany as a forced labourer. During this time, her career as an artist began, with illustrations for an English-language textbook. She also began writing stories and occasional poems. In 1945, she began studying Polish literature before switching to sociology at Jagiellonian University in Kraków. There, she became involved in the local writing scene, and met and was influenced by Czesław Miłosz. In March 1945, she published her first poem, "Szukam słowa" ("Looking for words"), in the daily newspaper Dziennik Polski. Her poems continued to be published in various newspapers and periodicals for a number of years. In 1948, she quit her studies without a degree, due to poor financial circumstances; the same year, she married poet Adam Włodek, whom she divorced in 1954. They remained close until Włodek's death in 1986. Their union was childless. Around the time of her marriage, she was working as a secretary for an educational biweekly magazine as well as an illustrator. Her first book was to be published in 1949, but did not pass censorship as it "did not meet socialist requirements".

Szymborska adhered to the People's Republic of Poland's (PRL) official ideology early in her career. For example, during the Polish anti-religious campaign, she signed an infamous 1953 political petition condemning Polish priests accused of treason in a Kraków show trial. Her early work supported socialist themes, as seen in her debut collection Dlatego żyjemy (That is what we are living for), containing the poems "Lenin" and "Młodzieży budującej Nową Hutę" ("For the Youth who are building Nowa Huta"), about the construction of a Stalinist industrial town near Kraków. She became a member of the ruling Polish United Workers' Party.

Although initially close to the official party line, as the Polish Communist Party shifted from the Stalinist communists to "national" communists, Szymborska grew estranged from socialist ideology and renounced her earlier political work. Although she did not officially leave the Communist party until 1966, she began to establish contacts with dissident intellectuals. As early as 1957, she befriended Jerzy Giedroyc, the editor of the influential Paris-based émigré journal Kultura, to which she contributed. In 1964, she opposed a Communist-backed protest to The Times against independent intellectuals, demanding freedom of speech instead.

In 1953, Szymborska joined the staff of the literary review magazine Życie Literackie (Literary Life), where she continued to work until 1981 and from 1968 had a book review column, Lektury Nadobowiązkowe. Many of her essays from this period were later published in book form. From 1981 to 1983, she was an editor of the Kraków-based monthly periodical NaGlos (OutLoud). In the 1980s, she intensified her oppositional activities, contributing to the samizdat periodical Arka under the pseudonym "Stańczykówna", as well as to Kultura. In the early 1990s, with a poem published in Gazeta Wyborcza, she supported the vote of no confidence in the first non-Communist government that brought former Communists back to power. The last collection published while Szymborska was still alive, Dwukropek, was chosen as the best book of 2006 by readers of Poland's Gazeta Wyborcza. She also translated French literature into Polish, in particular Baroque poetry and the works of Agrippa d'Aubigné, a Huguenot soldier-poet during the French Wars of Religion. In the Germanosphere, Szymborska is closely associated with Łódź-born literary translator Karl Dedecius, who did much to popularize postwar Polish literature there.

From 1967 she was in a relationship with Kornel Filipowicz.

== Death and last works ==
Surrounded by friends and relatives, Szymborska died peacefully of lung cancer in her sleep at home in Kraków in 2012, aged 88. She was working on new poetry at the time of her death, but was unable to arrange her final poems for publication in the way she wanted. Her last poetry was published later in 2012. In 2013, the Wisława Szymborska Award was established in honour of her legacy.

In 2024, the Wisława Szymborska Foundation president Michał Rusinek signed an agreement with Polskie Radio's OFF Radio Krakow for the rights to use her voice recordings for generated speech to be used for an interview-like programme. The programme, broadcast on 29 October that year, was swiftly condemned by both Polish audiences and media producers.

== Themes ==
Szymborska frequently employed literary devices such as ironic precision, paradox, contradiction, and understatement to illuminate philosophical themes and obsessions. Many of her poems feature war and terrorism. She wrote from unusual points of view, such as a cat in the newly empty apartment of its dead owner. Her reputation rests on a relatively small body of work, fewer than 350 poems. When asked why she had published so few poems, she said, "I have a trash can in my home".

== Pop culture ==
Szymborska's poem "Buffo" was set to music by Barbara Maria Zakrzewska-Nikiporczyk in 1985.

Her poem "Love at First Sight" was used in the film Turn Left, Turn Right, starring Takeshi Kaneshiro and Gigi Leung. Krzysztof Kieślowski's film Three Colors: Red was also inspired by "Love at First Sight".

In her last year, Szymborska collaborated with Polish jazz trumpeter Tomasz Stańko, who dedicated his record Wisława (ECM, 2013) to her memory, taking inspiration from their collaboration and her poetry.

Szymborska's poem "People on the Bridge" was made into a film by Beata Poźniak. It was shown worldwide and at a New Delhi film festival. As an award, it was screened 36 more times in 18 Indian cities.

The poem Nothing Twice (Nic dwa razy) has inspired multiple musical adaptations, including Łucja Prus's performance at the 1965 Sopot International Song Festival and Maanam's song Nic dwa razy, from their 1994 album Róża. In 2022, Sanah adapted the poem into a song as part of her project based on Polish poetry, Sanah śpiewa Poezyje.

== Major works ==
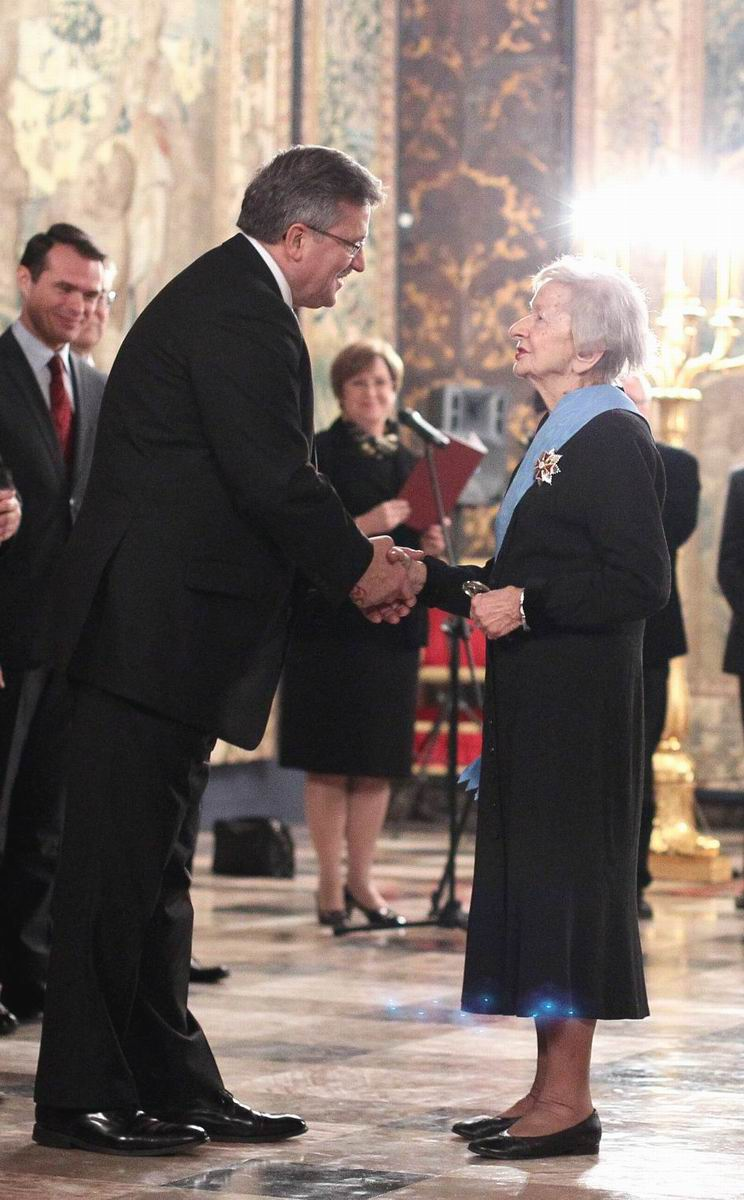
Wisława Szymborska and President Bronisław Komorowski at the Order of the White Eagle award ceremony in January 2011.

- 1952: Dlatego żyjemy ("That's Why We Are All Alive")
- 1954: Pytania zadawane sobie ("Questioning Yourself")
- 1957: Wołanie do Yeti ("Calling Out to Yeti")
- 1962: Sól ("Salt")
- 1966: 101 wierszy ("101 Poems")
- 1967: Sto pociech ("No End of Fun")
- 1967: Poezje wybrane ("Selected Poetry")
- 1972: Wszelki wypadek ("Could Have")
- 1976: Wielka liczba ("A Large Number")
- 1986: Ludzie na moście ("People on the Bridge")
- 1989: Poezje. Poems, bilingual Polish-English edition
- 1992: Lektury nadobowiązkowe ("Non-required Reading")
- 1993: Koniec i początek ("The End and the Beginning")
- 1996: Widok z ziarnkiem piasku ("View with a Grain of Sand")
- 1997: Sto wierszy – sto pociech ("100 Poems – 100 Happinesses")
- 2002: Chwila ("Moment")
- 2003: Rymowanki dla dużych dzieci ("Rhymes for Big Kids")
- 2005: Dwukropek ("Colon")
- 2005: Monolog psa zaplątanego w dzieje ("Monologue of a Dog Ensnared in History")
- 2009: Tutaj ("Here")
- 2012: Wystarczy ("Enough")
- 2013: Błysk rewolwru ("The Glimmer of a Revolver")

== Prizes and awards ==
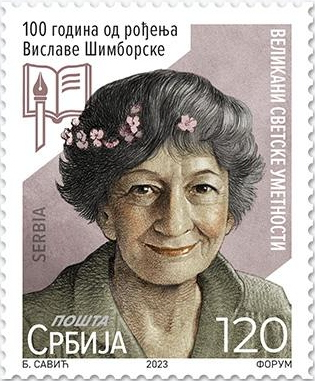
Szymborska on a 2023 stamp of Serbia

- 1954: The City of Kraków Prize for Literature
- 1963: The Polish Ministry of Culture Prize
- 1974: Knight's Cross of the Order of Polonia Restituta
- 1990: Kościelski Award
- 1991: Goethe Prize
- 1995: Herder Prize
- 1995: Honorary Degree of the Adam Mickiewicz University (Poznań)
- 1996: The Polish PEN Club prize
- 1996: Nobel Prize in Literature
- 1996: Person of the Year by Wprost
- 1997: Honorary Resident of the Royal Capital City of Kraków
- 2005: Gold Medal for Merit to Culture - Gloria Artis
- 2011: Order of the White Eagle

== Reviews ==
- 1998 Boston Review: Poems – New and Collected 1957–1997 by Frances Padorr Brent
- 2001 The New Republic: "Miracle Fair: Selected Poems of Wislawa Szymborska" by Ruth Franklin
- 2006 The Christian Science Monitor: A fascinating journey with two women poets by Elizabeth Lund
- 2006 Moondance magazine: Stories/Poems. Plain and Simple. – Mapping the Words of Wislawa Szymborska on Her Latest Book, Monologue of a Dog by Lys Anzia
- 2006 Sarmatian Review: Wislawa Szymborska's 'Conversation With a Stone' – An Interpretation by Mary Ann Furno
- 2006 Words Without Borders: Monologue of a Dog – New Poems of Wislawa Szymborska by W. Martin
- 2015 All roads will lead you home Poetic Alchemy: Wislawa Szymborska's Map: Collected and Last Poems by Wally Swist [vacpoetry.org/journal/]

== See also ==
- Moskalik (poetry)
- Wisława Szymborska Award
