= Bnin, Kórnik =

Part of the town of Kórnik, Poland

Coordinates: 52°13′52.82″N 17°05′45.89″E

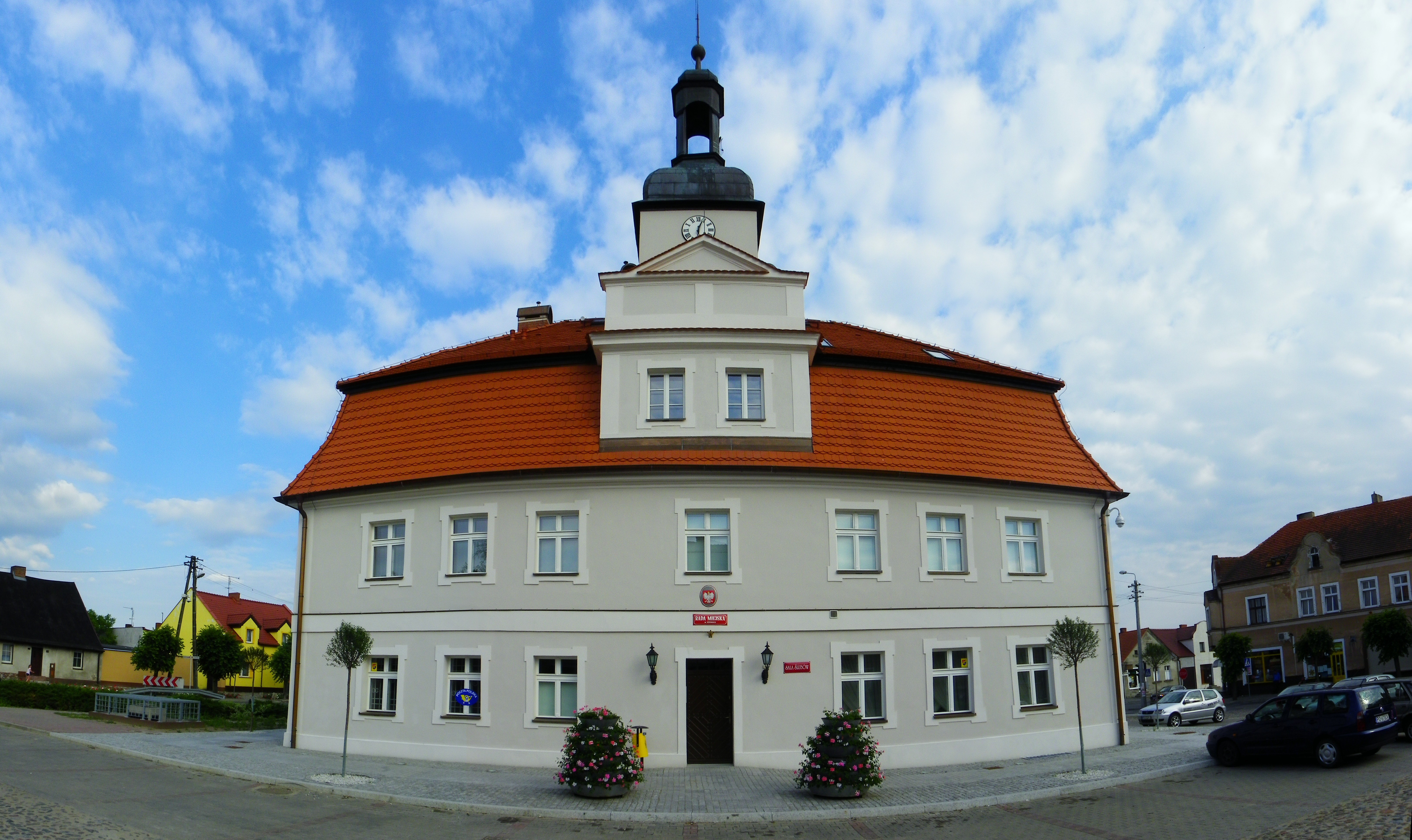
Bnin's Town Hall

Bnin [bnin] (German: Seebrück) is part of the town of Kórnik, south-east of the city of Poznań, in Greater Poland Voivodeship in western Poland, between Lake Kórnickie and Lake Bnińskie. From 1395 to 1934, Bnin was a town in its own right. It became part of Kórnik in 1961.

Near Lake Bnińskie, there are remnants of an ancient fortified settlement. Probably princes of Greater Poland (Wielkopolska) owned it. Later on, the town was the ancestral home of the Bninski family (coat of arms: Łodzia). In the 15th century, Andrzej Bniński, Bishop of Poznan in 1438–1479, was the heir of the town. He erected there a stone church. In 1775, Lady Teofila Potulicka from the Dzialynski family (the heiress at that time) completely rebuilt the church. In the late 19th century, the town was composed of 126 homes, with about 1300 inhabitants: 263 Evangelicals and 1040 Catholics. It was the only town in the Grand Duchy of Poznań without a Jewish population. Most of the inhabitants were occupied with agriculture. There was an elementary school, a post office, and four market places. Bnin belonged then to the Działyński family then.

== Notable residents ==
In the formerly separate settlement of Prowent, lying between Bnin and Kórnik, the Nobel Prize-winning poet Wisława Szymborska was born in 1923. She was the second daughter of Wincenty Szymborski and Anna (née Rottermund) Szymborska.
