= Cat in an Empty Apartment =

Poem by Wisława Szymborska

"Cat in an Empty Apartment" (Polish: Kot w pustym mieszkaniu) is a poem by the Polish poet Wisława Szymborska. It was written after the death of her partner, the Polish writer Kornel Filipowicz, who died in February 1990. At the center of the poem is a house cat waiting in an abandoned apartment for its deceased owner. The point of view of a cat that cannot grasp death leads to an unusual view of human mortality.

Szymborska published the poem in the magazine Odra in 1991 and included it in her poetry collection Koniec i początek (The End and the Beginning) in 1993. Especially after Szymborska was awarded the Nobel Prize in Literature in 1996, the poem found international distribution in numerous translations. It became one of her best-known and most popular poems, especially in Poland.

== Content ==
The poem begins with the line:

"Die — you can't do that to a cat..".

It then describes a domestic cat waiting for its deceased owner in an empty apartment. Externally, the rooms are unchanged, but for the cat, life has lost its order. Although a human continues to look after it, it is no longer its familiar caregiver. Despite all the prohibitions, the cat searches the entire apartment until, in the end, there is nothing left to do but sleep and wait. The cat imagines how it will meet the missing person again. Offended and without a sign of joy, it wants to show him that one does not disappear like this to a cat.

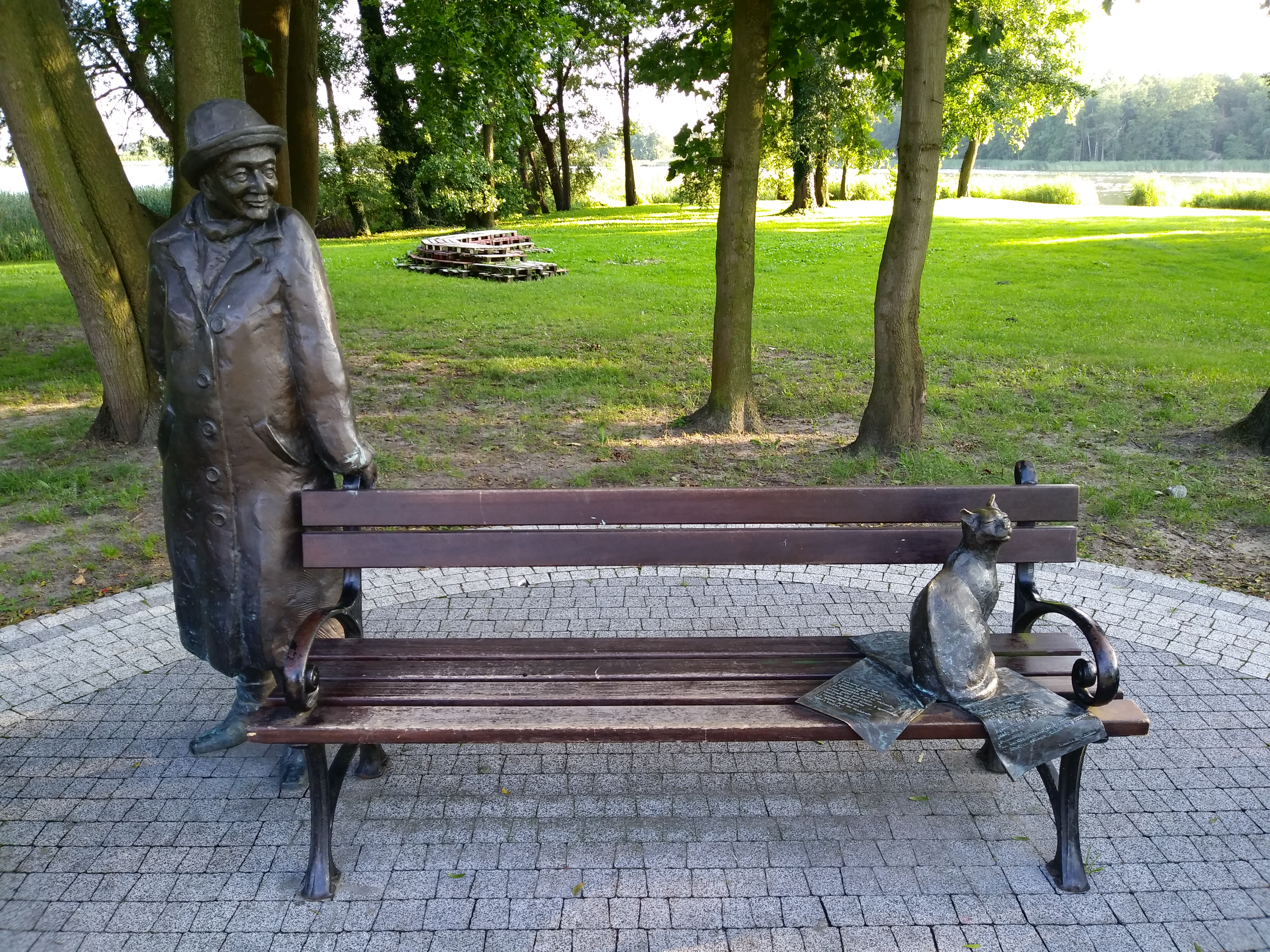
Sculpture bench in Kórnik with quotations from the poem

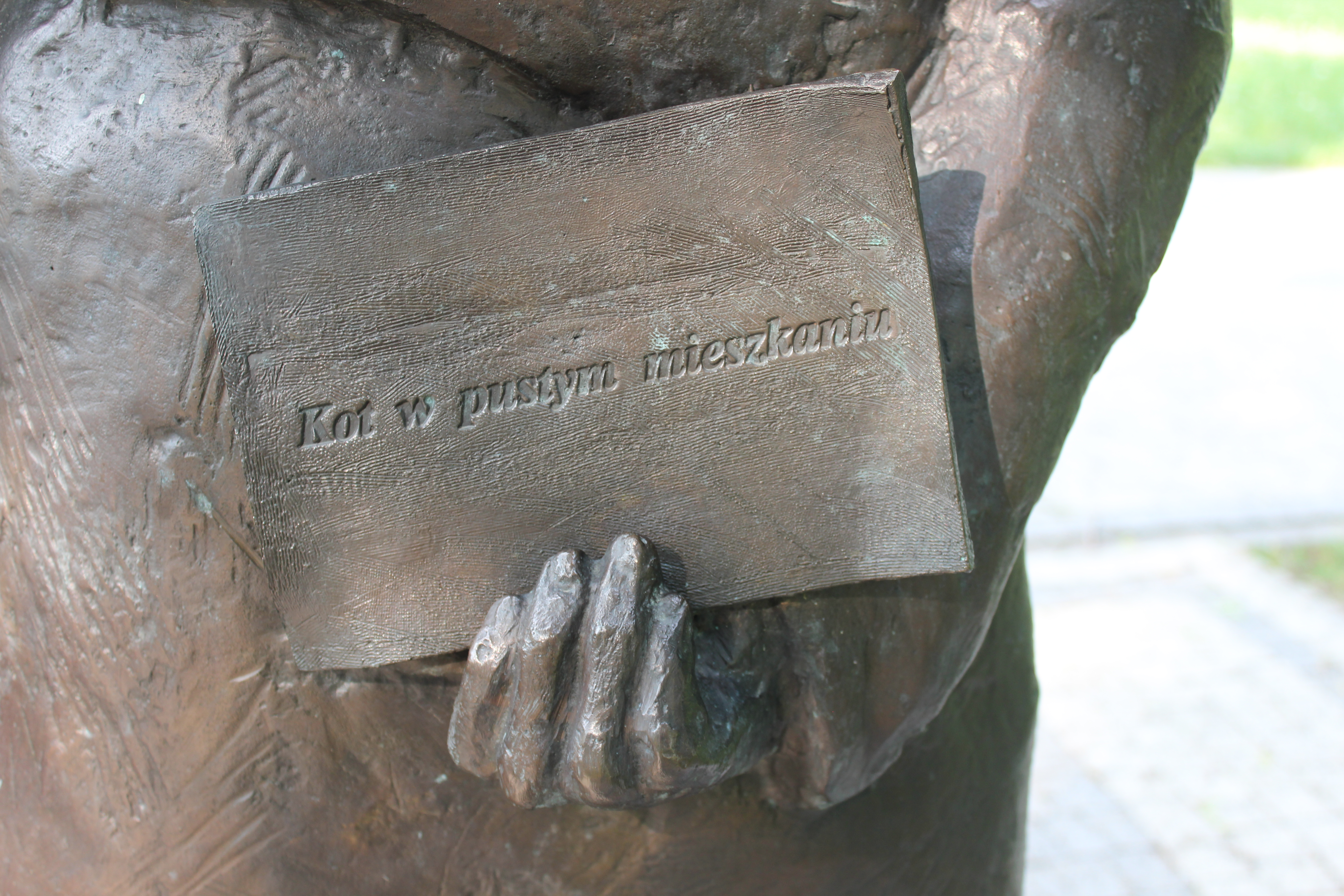
"Kot w pustym mieszkaniu" "Cat in an Empty Apartment"

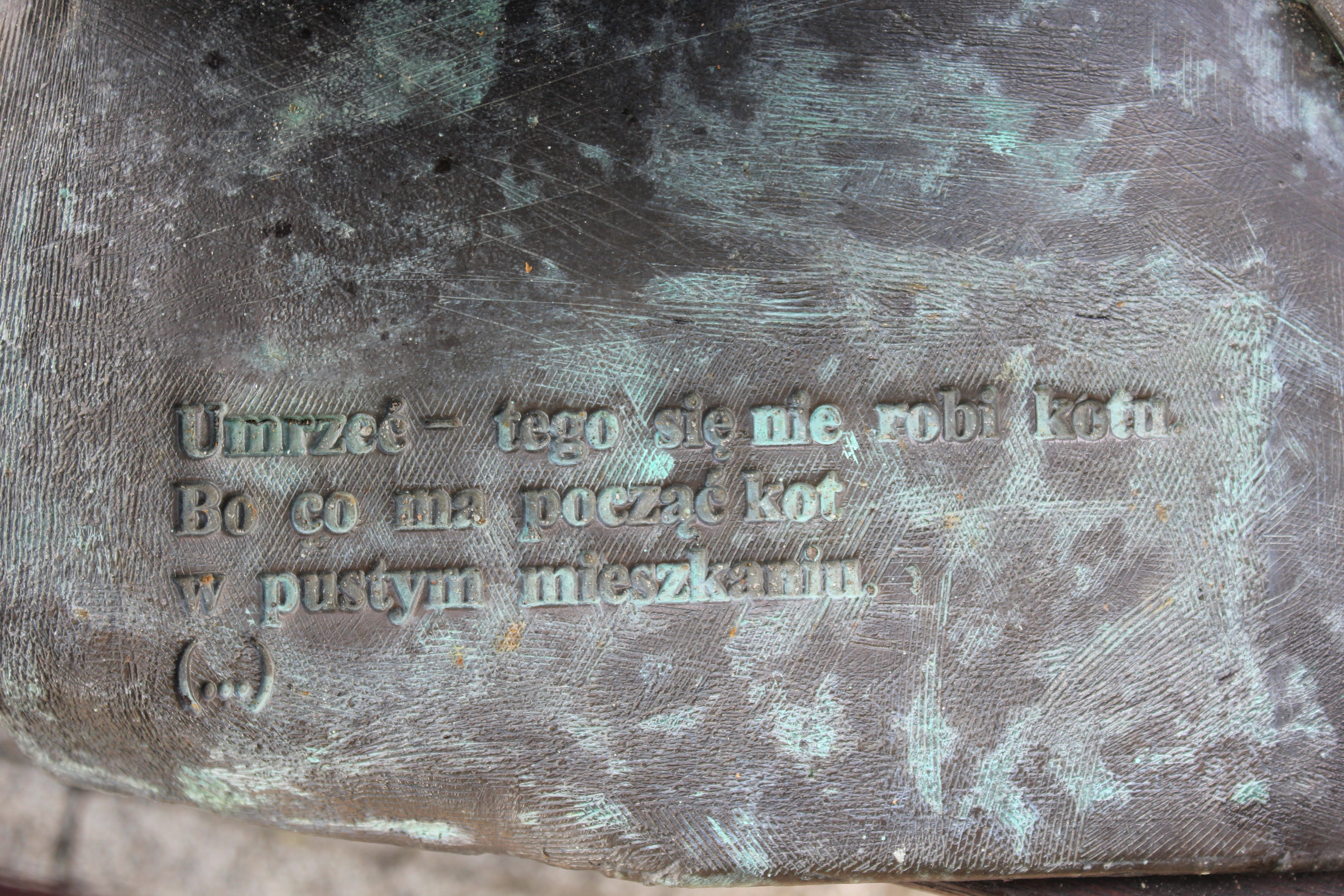
"Umrzeć – tego się nie robi kotu [...]“ "Die — you can't do that to a cat.."

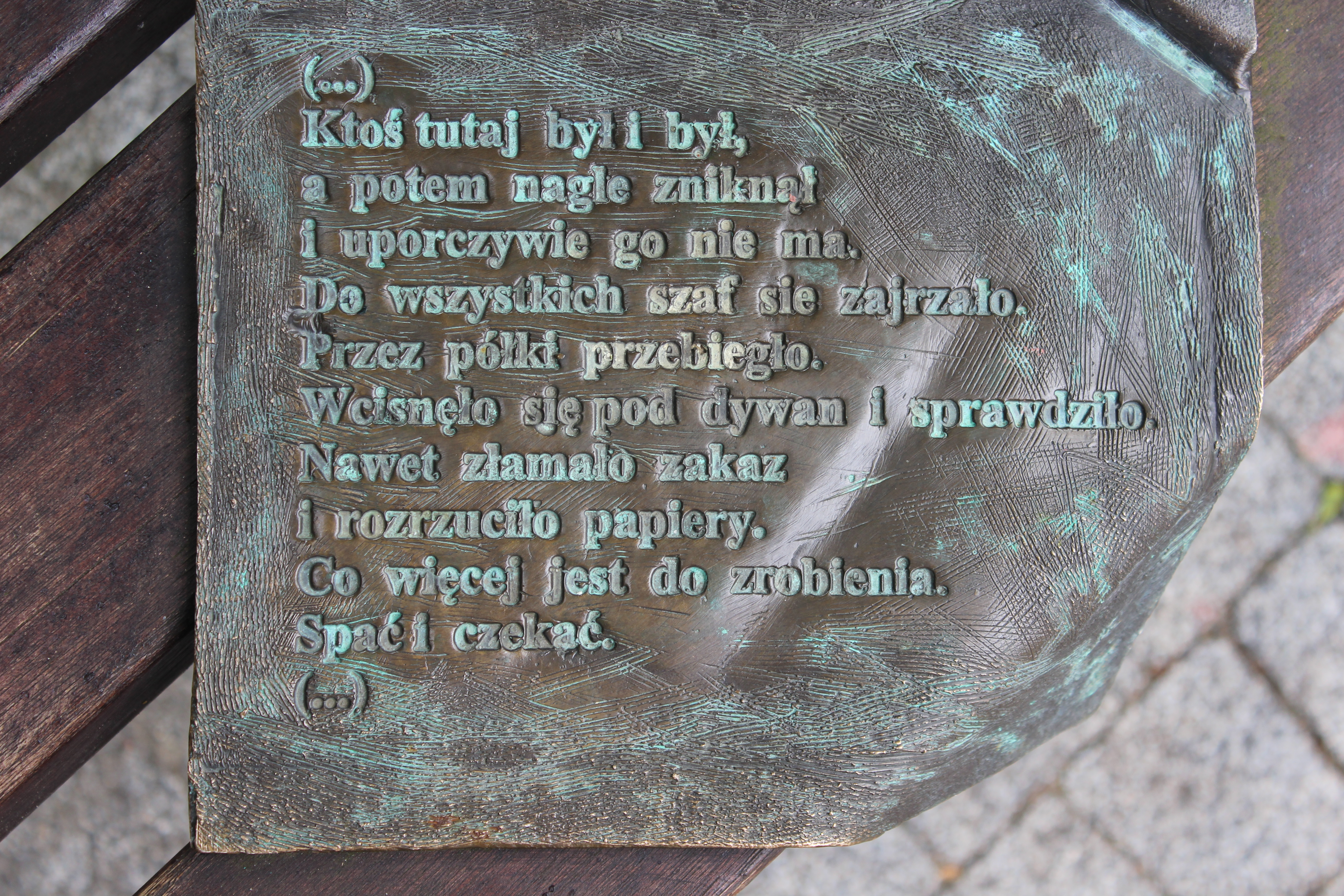
„Ktoś tutaj był i był [...]“ "Someone was always, always here,“

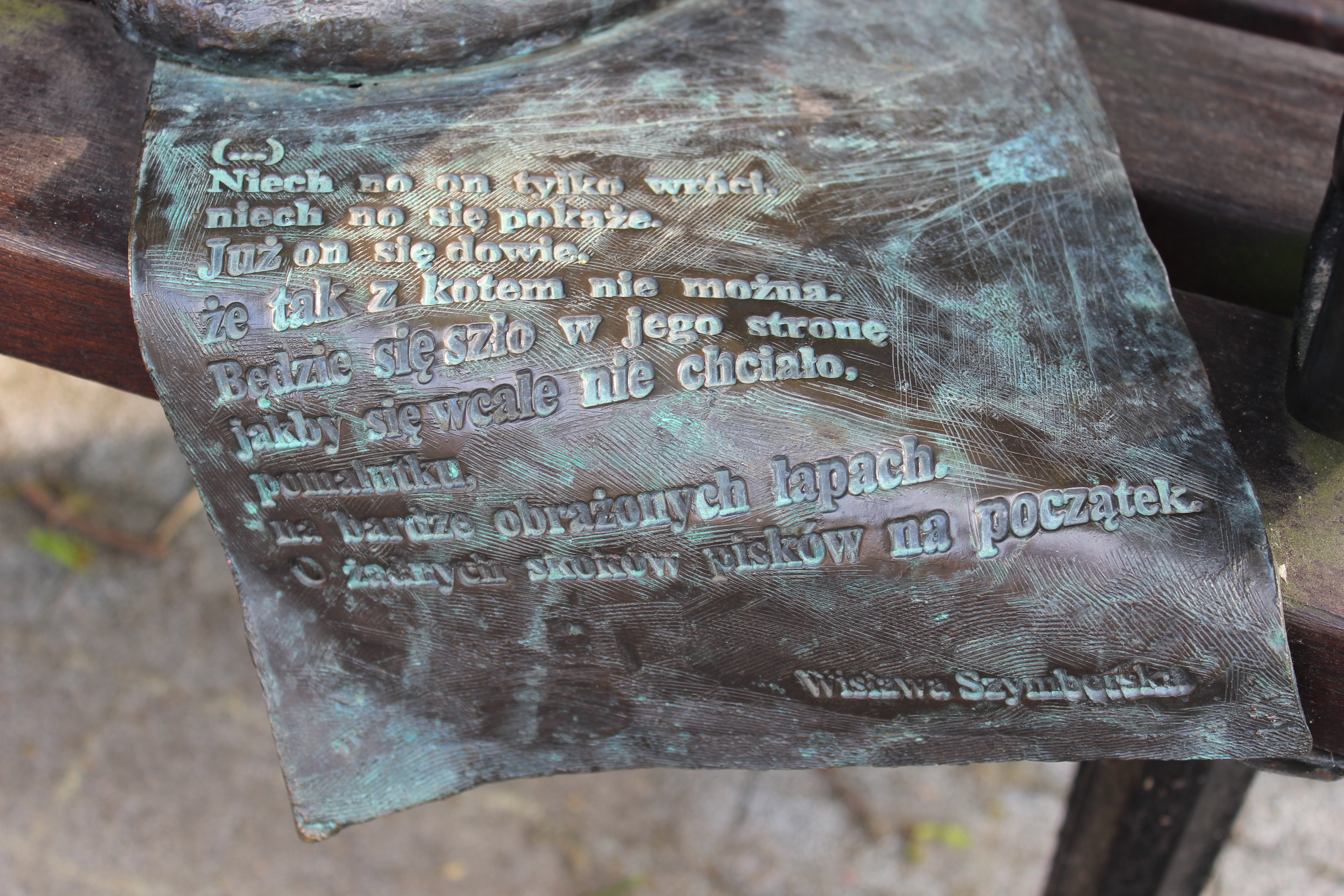
„[...] na bardzo obrażonych łapach [...]“ „[...] on visibly offended paws [...]“

== Form ==
The poem Cat in an Empty Apartment comprises five strophes made up of a varying number of rhymeless, free verses. Gerhard Bauer describes the simple language as an "elegy in a child's tone". There is often an antithesis between the pairs of lines, for example when in strophe two a sensory impression is followed by the negation of the familiar memory ("Footsteps on the staircase, but they're new ones."). Three indefinite pronouns in strophe three (twice "something", once "someone") refer to the indeterminacy of the memories, whereby the pronouns in the Polish original ("Coś" and "Ktoś"), in their phonetic similarity, reveal a connection between the missing event and the missing person. After the first three strophes focus on the cat's perception, the final two strophes show its reactions, which change from activity to a resigned retreat ("What remains to be done. Just sleep and wait.").

In the Polish original, the poem remains indeterminate between a role poem and free indirect speech, in that the sentences in which the cat acts are written in the infinitive or the impersonal form (third person singular neutral with reflexive pronoun).

== Interpretation ==
=== Speaker ===
The impersonal form in which the cat's actions are described in the poem leads interpreters to make very different judgments about the speaker of the poem. For Janusz Orlikowski, for example, it is simply "the cat" that speaks, whereas for Wojciech Kajtoch it is "an anthropomorphized cat or someone who thinks like a cat." Stanisław Żak identifies a representative of both "the cat" and "the poetess named Wisława Szymborska". For Tadeusz Nyczek, the cat expresses an "omniscient narrator" and an impersonal " self" (Polish: "się"), which he associates with Heidegger's "man". In contrast, Katarzyna Kuczyńska recognizes in the impersonal form simply the grammatical equivalent of isolation, in which the cat has also stopped saying "I" after losing the "you".

For Dörte Lütvogt, the first three lines reveal a human being as the speaker of the poem. Even the introductory term "die", which is additionally emphasized by the hyphen that separates it, lies outside the horizon of a cat's consciousness. The reproach "you can't do that to a cat", which could be directed equally at the deceased and at death itself, reveals an emotional involvement of the human speaker in the event. It hides its own inappropriate feeling of being offended behind the understandable offense of an animal. Although the speaker fades almost completely into the background from the fourth line onwards, it remains present until the end behind the imagined inner world of a cat.

=== Animal and man ===
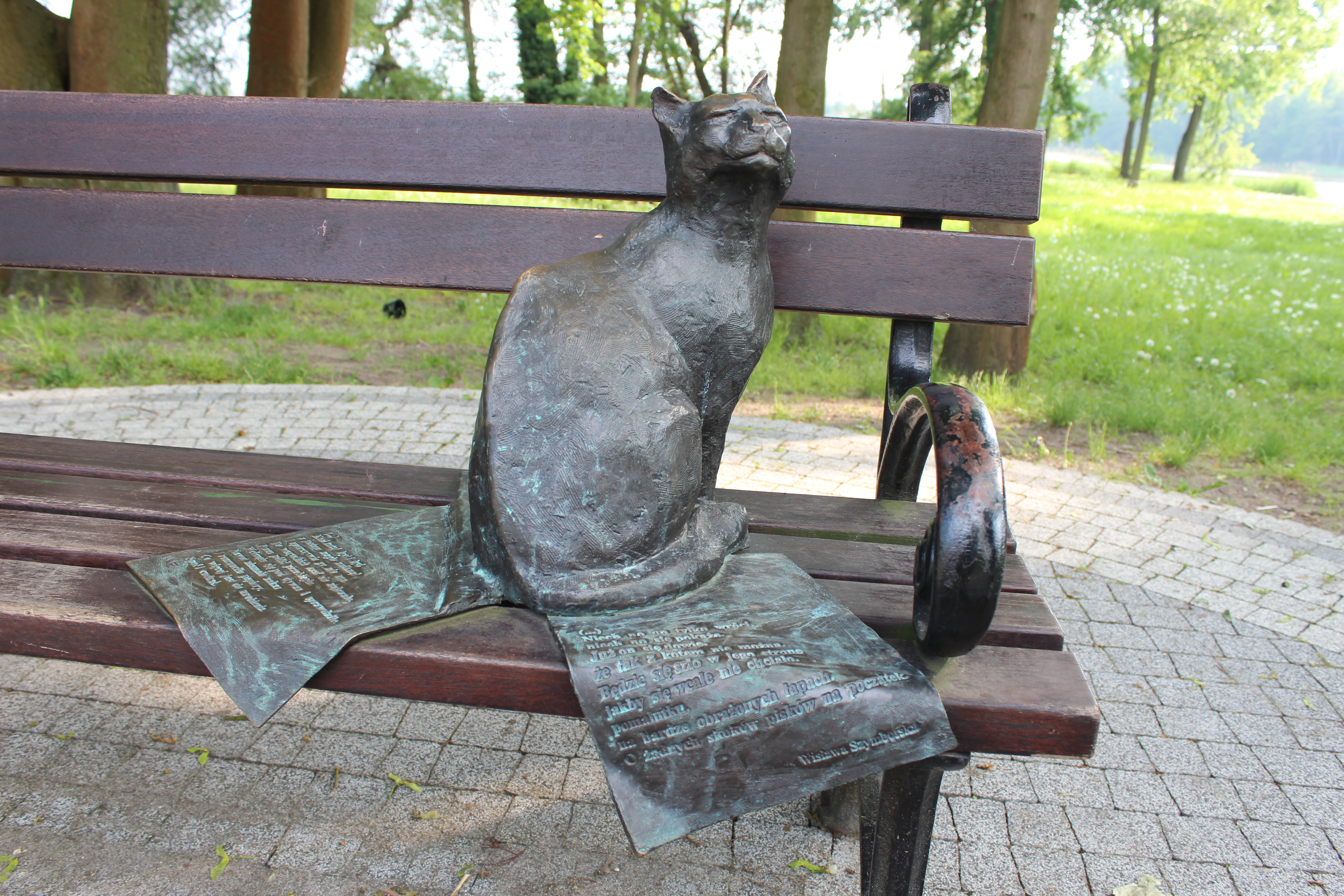
Sculpture of a cat in Kórnik

According to Lütvogt, the attempt to put oneself in the mind of an animal is always caught between anthropomorphism and behaviorism or, as Wisława Szymborska put it in her review of a book by Konrad Lorenz, a "humanization or dehumanization of the psyche of animals". The poet found her middle ground in Lorenz's concept of comparative behavioral research, which traced both animal and human behavior back to "something pre-human". In her work, the relationship between humans and animals is always characterized by a special responsibility of humans for the creature, but also its inviolable autonomy, which should be respected by them.

The poem "Thinking up the world" (Obmyślam świat) in Szymborska's early poetry collection Calling out to Yeti (Wołanie do Yeti) from 1957 already proclaimed a "language of plants and animals." Numerous poems about animals followed in her later work, for example in the selected volume Tarsjusz i inne wiersze from 1976. Szymborska expressed a similar empathy for the psyche of a waiting animal as in "Cat in an Empty Apartment" in a feuilleton published in 1981, in which she took the review of a book on dog diseases as an opportunity to reflect on the psychological burdens of a pet dog: "Every time we leave the house, the dog atones for it with a despair as if we had gone away forever. Every time we come back, it is a joy for the dog that borders on shock - as if we had been saved by a miracle." Humans have no way of comforting the waiting animal with the date of their return. "The dog is condemned to an eternity of hopeless waiting."

=== Offense and reproach ===
According to Szymborska's understanding, the cat in the empty apartment is capable of conscious memory and anticipation. Its expectations of the future coincide with the memory of past events. It reacts to the disappearance of its human caregiver with a sense of grievance and betrayal, the accusation that such a thing should not be done to it. For Wojciech Kajtoch, this kind of reproach is typically human, and the imagined reaction when the absent person returns is for him an expression of a "specifically female (but also girlish and childish) coquetry." For Dörte Lütvogt, the insult on display, despite its transparency and comedy, is a form of exercise of power by the actually powerless and dependent. Although the nature of the cat is far less fixated on its owner than, for example, the waiting dog, the dependency of the habitual animal cat lies above all in the desire for the order maintained and now disturbed by the missing person.

Although the situation of the poem proves the cat's perspective wrong, according to Gerhard Bauer, the reader tends involuntarily to side with the cat and, like the animal, refuse to acknowledge the situation that has arisen through death. The charm and "childish" behavior of the cat in its struggle against the incontrovertible certainty of death contributes to this. For Marian Stala, the poem denies the self-evidence and power of death, which every living being has to come to terms with: "It becomes a metaphysical scandal", something "that one must not do [for example: do to no one], that must not happen". Barbara Surowska agrees: "One does not condemn a sensitive, living being to a wait that never comes to an end..." Tadeusz Nyczek, on the other hand, emphasizes the irony of the poem, according to which living beings initially react to injustice inflicted on them by being offended. "Only then do we jump on his shoulder with a squeak".

=== Hope and realization ===
In the last strophe, human and animal consciousness overlap, creating a culmination of comedy and tragedy, which for Lütvogt is the poem's special effect, also described by Tadeusz Nyczek as its "most gaping wound". The animal's impotent, hopeful waiting for a reunion comes up against the reality, comprehensible only to humans, that death is irreversible. It is no coincidence that the poem ends with the words "to start" ("na początek"), because for the animal, which lacks human awareness of time, nothing else is conceivable than a cyclical return of the eternally same, while only humans can grasp that a completely changed situation has occurred in which repetition is no longer possible.

In the implicit comparison of a grieving human being with a waiting cat, the poem poses the question for Lütvogt as to whether the reader wants to exchange the hope of the cat for the hopelessness of the human being or whether, on the contrary, the human being's ability to actively come to terms with a situation is preferable to the continually disappointed expectation of the animal. In this way, Szymborska breaks with a traditional mental model according to which ignorance of death is a paradisiacal state. According to Renate Ingbrant, Szymborska often uses an unusual point of view such as the one in the poem, through which the reader not only observes the cat, but is drawn into its feline nature in order to gain new, unusual insights into seemingly familiar processes. For Barbara Surowska, "Cat in an Empty Apartment" crowns "a long series of poems in which Szymborska tries to say that we never meet anything we take for granted."

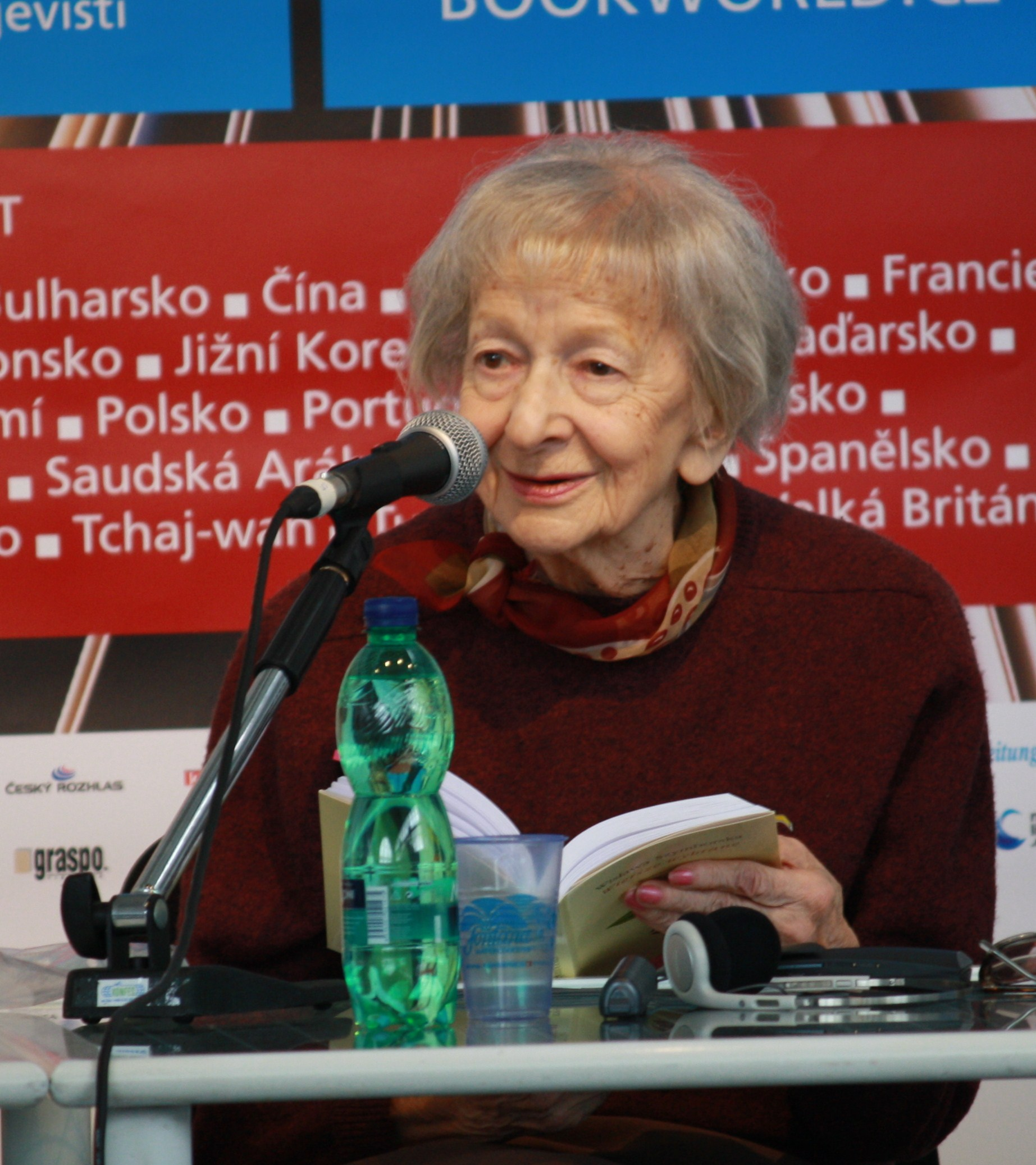
Wisława Szymborska at a poetry reading in Prague, 2010

=== Autobiographical reference ===
"Cat in an Empty Apartment" is one of a series of poems that Szymborska published in 1993 in the poetry collection Koniec i początek (English: The End and the Beginning) and which are to be understood as a reaction to the death of her long-time partner Kornel Filipowicz in 1990. In "The real world" (Jawa), Szymborska describes the contrast between the dream world and the waking world, between the dreamlike memory of a dead person, which suspends the passage of time, and the irrevocable real transience. "Elegiac Calculation" (Rachunek elegijny) assesses the deceased acquaintances of a lyrical subject, whereby the attempt to approach death leads to the concept of "absence". "Parting with a View" (Pożegnanie widoku) contrasts the transience of the individual with the life cycle of nature.

According to Lütvogt, all of these poems in Koniec i początek express the author's personal involvement with the subject of death with an "incomparable discretion", on which the powerful effect of "Cat in an Empty Apartment" is based. According to the interpretations of Żak, WisłaKajtoch/Orlikowski and Stala, by expressing her own grief through another being equally affected by death, the author succeeds in controlling her own emotions, maintaining composure and dignity even in pain, opposing death and presenting an alternative world of hope. According to Justyna Sobolewska, the poem makes direct reference to the story "A Cat in a Wet Grass" (Kot w mokrej trawie) by the late prose writer Filipowicz. It remains open to the reader to what extent the poem is actually based on a real event after Filipowicz's death. In any case, György Gömöri recalls a photographically recorded encounter with Szymborska in which a cat was resting on her lap.

== Publication and reception ==
Kot w pustym mieszkaniu first appeared in the magazine Odra in 1991. Two years later, Szymborska included the poem in her collection Koniec i początek. The English translation "Cat in an Empty Apartment" by Stanisław Barańczak and Clare Cavanagh was published by The New York Review of Books in 1993

Kot w pustym mieszkaniu is one of Szymborska's best-known, most popular and frequently quoted poems in Poland. According to Barańczak, the poem became a veritable cult object in Szymborska's homeland. In 2007, it had achieved the status of compulsory reading in Polish elementary school. Especially after Szymborska was awarded the Nobel Prize for Literature in 1996, the poem was also widely translated beyond Poland's borders and was praised by international critics. When her death was announced on 1 February 2012, the poem was once again widely spread by the media[29].

Several reviewers, including György Gömöri and Elke Heidenreich, singled out the poem as one of their favorites from Szymborska's oeuvre. For Gerhard Bauer, the poem "Cat in an Empty Apartment" "plays out tact and reason to such perfection that we can only admire it [...]. " The Wiener Zeitung praised it as a "masterpiece" with an "unforgettable opening line." Małgorzata Baranowska called it "one of the most unusual and beautiful love poems". Peter Hamm also spoke of it as "one of the most beautiful and painful love poems ever". Małgorzata Anna Packalén considered the poem to be one of the most remarkable laments since Jan Kochanowski's Treny.In reaction to "Cat in an Empty Apartment", the Polish poet Marianna Bocian visualized a dead woman in the furniture and objects of her house in the poem "In the House of the Deceased".

== Editions ==
=== Original version ===
- Wisława Szymborska: Kot w pustym mieszkaniu. In: Odra Nr. 6 1991, pp. 3–4.
- Wisława Szymborska: Kot w pustym mieszkaniu. In: Wisława Szymborska: Koniec i początek. Wydawnictwa A5, Poznań 1993, ISBN 83-85568-03-4, pp. 20–21.

=== English translation ===
- Wisława Szymborska: "Cat in an Empty Apartment" In: Nothing twice (selected poems). Selected and translated by Stanisław Barańczak and Clare Cavanagh. Wydawnictwo Literackie, Kraków 1997 ISBN 83-08-02678-8. pp. 347-349.

== Bibliography ==
- Gerhard Bauer: Frage-Kunst. Szymborskas Gedichte. Stroemfeld/Nexus, Frankfurt am Main 2004, ISBN 3-86109-169-0, pp. 206–207.
- Dörte Lütvogt: Zeit und Zeitlichkeit in der Dichtung Wisława Szymborskas. Sagner, Munich 2007, ISBN 978-3-87690-914-1, pp. 264–279.
