= Moskalik (poetry) =

Type of humorous verse in Polish poetry

In Polish poetry, moskalik is a short humorous verse, whose structure follows and parodies the stanza from "Polonez Kościuszki" by Rajnold Suchodolski:

Polish text	English translation
Kto powiedział, że Moskale; Są to bracia dla Lechitów, Temu pierwszy w łeb wypalę Przed kościołem Karmelitów.	If someone says that Moskals, Are brothers of Lechites, I will be the first one to punch him in the forehead, In front of the Church of Carmelites.

This form of poetry originated as a game in literati circles of Kraków. Many years later, Gazeta Wyborcza reported about this, and a participant, Nobel Prize winner Wisława Szymborska sent to the newspaper a large list of moskaliks titled "Rymowaną rozprawa o wyższości Sarmatów nad inszymi nacjami tudzież o słusznej karze na zatwardziałych, którzy tego poglądu nie podzielają" ["A rhymed treatise on the superiority of the Sarmatians (Note: "Sarmatians", is a hint to Sarmatism.) over other nations and on the just punishment for those who do not share this view"]. After that many other poets joined the game. Later Szymborska published a book Moskaliki, czyli o wyższości Sarmatów nad inszymi nacjami [Moskaliki, or on the Superiority of Sarmatians over Other Nations]. Szymborska, in her 2003 book Rymowanki dla dużych dzieci [Rhymes for Big Kids] claimed that either she or her husband, Adam Włodek were the ones who composed the first moskalik.

The form of moskalik was canonized as follows: it begins with the words "If someone says that..." or something similar. In the rhyming position, some nation should appear. In the second line some absolutely obvious statement about the nation should be provided, such as that it uses an encyclopedia, brushes its teeth, etc. The third line describes violent action against the alleged utterer of the statement, and the last line is the place where the assault is supposed to happen. While the form is rigorous, authors of moskaliks demonstrate an amazing variability in the choice of the four components. An example from the collection of Szymborska:

Polish text	English translation
Kto powiedział, że Anglicy uczęszczają do teatrów, tego rąbnę po przyłbicy pod kościołem Bonifratrów.	If someone says that the English go to theaters, I will whack him in the bascinet by the Church of the Brothers Hospitallers.

At about the same time when the moskalik was codified, violations of the canon stated to proliferate, most often with the purpose of "righting the wrong": "Whoever denies that the Kurds / have the right to exist," / I'll tell him straight in the face / that he's a scoundrel without a conscience."

== See also ==
- Limerick (poetry)
