= 1996 Nobel Prize in Literature =

- Wisława Szymborska
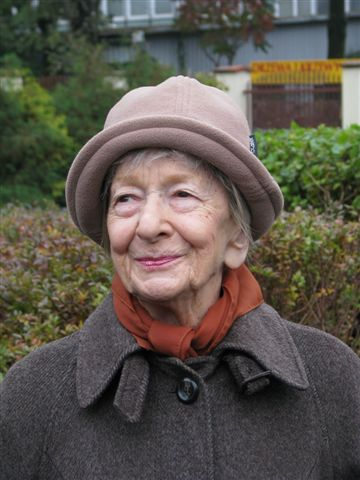
- "for poetry that with ironic precision allows the historical and biological context to come to light in fragments of human reality."
- Date: 3 October 1996 (announcement); 10 December 1996 (ceremony)
- Location: Stockholm, Sweden
- Presented by: Swedish Academy
- First award: 1901
- Website: Official website

The 1996 Nobel Prize in Literature was awarded to the Polish poet Wisława Szymborska (1923–2012) "for poetry that with ironic precision allows the historical and biological context to come to light in fragments of human reality." Szymborska is the 9th female recipient and the 5th Nobel laureate from Poland after Czesław Miłosz in 1980.

== Laureate ==
Wisława Szymborska's poetry addressed existential questions. In her poems, she employs literary devices such as ironic precision, paradox, contradiction, and understatement to illuminate philosophical themes and obsessions. She weaves in the machinery of eternity in a momentary experience of the here and now. Her poetry is characterized by a simplified, "personal" language that is unlike contemporary language, often with a little twist at the end, with a striking combination of spirituality, ingenuity, and empathy. Many of her poems feature war and terrorism. Among her well-known collections include Dlatego żyjemy ("That's Why We Are All Alive", 1952), Pytania zadawane sobie ("Questioning Yourself", 1954), Ludzie na moście ("People on the Bridge", 1986), Koniec i początek ("The End and the Beginning", 1993), and Widok z ziarnkiem piasku ("View with a Grain of Sand", 1996).

== Reactions ==
The choice of Szymborska was seen as a surprise by many observers who had expected a novelist to win the prize as the previous years prize had been awarded to the Irish poet Seamus Heaney. The exiled Chinese poet Bei Dao was also a favourite to win the prize. The prize decision provoked mixed reactions in the Swedish press. Mats Gellerfelt, a literature critic in Svenska Dagbladet, was critical about the choice of Szymborska, calling her "a mediocre poet customized for girl's rooms, as there are thousands of", while Tommy Olofsson in the same publication hailed Szymborska as "without doubt one of the most qualified poets of our century, and also loved by the people who have the privilege to read her in the original language".

“She has gone through a long evolution and has reached maturity,” said the Polish poet Czeslaw Milosz, who was awarded the Nobel Prize in 1980. “Polish poetry in the 20th century has reached a strong international position on the European continent. Szymborska represents it well.”

== Award ceremony speech ==
At the award ceremony in Stockholm on 10 December 1996, Birgitta Trotzig of the Swedish Academy said:

In Wislawa Szymborska the Swedish Academy wants to honour a representative – and a representative of unusual and unyielding purity and strength – of a poetic outlook. Of poetry as a response to life, a way of life, of the word-work as thought and responsibility.

Wislawa Szymborska’s making of poems is the perfection of the word-object, of the exquisitely chiseled thought-image – allegro ma non troppo, as one of her poems is called. But a darkness that is never directly touched is perceptible, just as the movement of blood under the skin. (...)

In Szymborska surface is depth, the path of negation has the effect of a quiet but tremendous explosion of being. “My identifying features / are rapture and despair”. The farther in one travels among the clear mirrors of her language pictures – crystalline clarity that in some way exists to lead one to a final enigma – the more one feels the world’s obtrusive unambiguousness being transformed.

== Nobel lecture ==
Szymborska delivered her Nobel lecture entitled The Poet and the World in the Polish language on December 7, 1996 at the Swedish Academy. During the Nobel banquet, on December 20, she expressed a short speech of gratitude, saying:

"No one is accustomed to receiving a Nobel Prize. Therefore no one is accustomed to expressing gratitude for it. In my native tongue, as well as in every other tongue, there are many beautiful words from which to choose. But I think that on this occasion the simplest word is the most serious and the most meaningful: Merci, dziękuję, tack."
