= Moskalik (fish) =

Small pickled herring

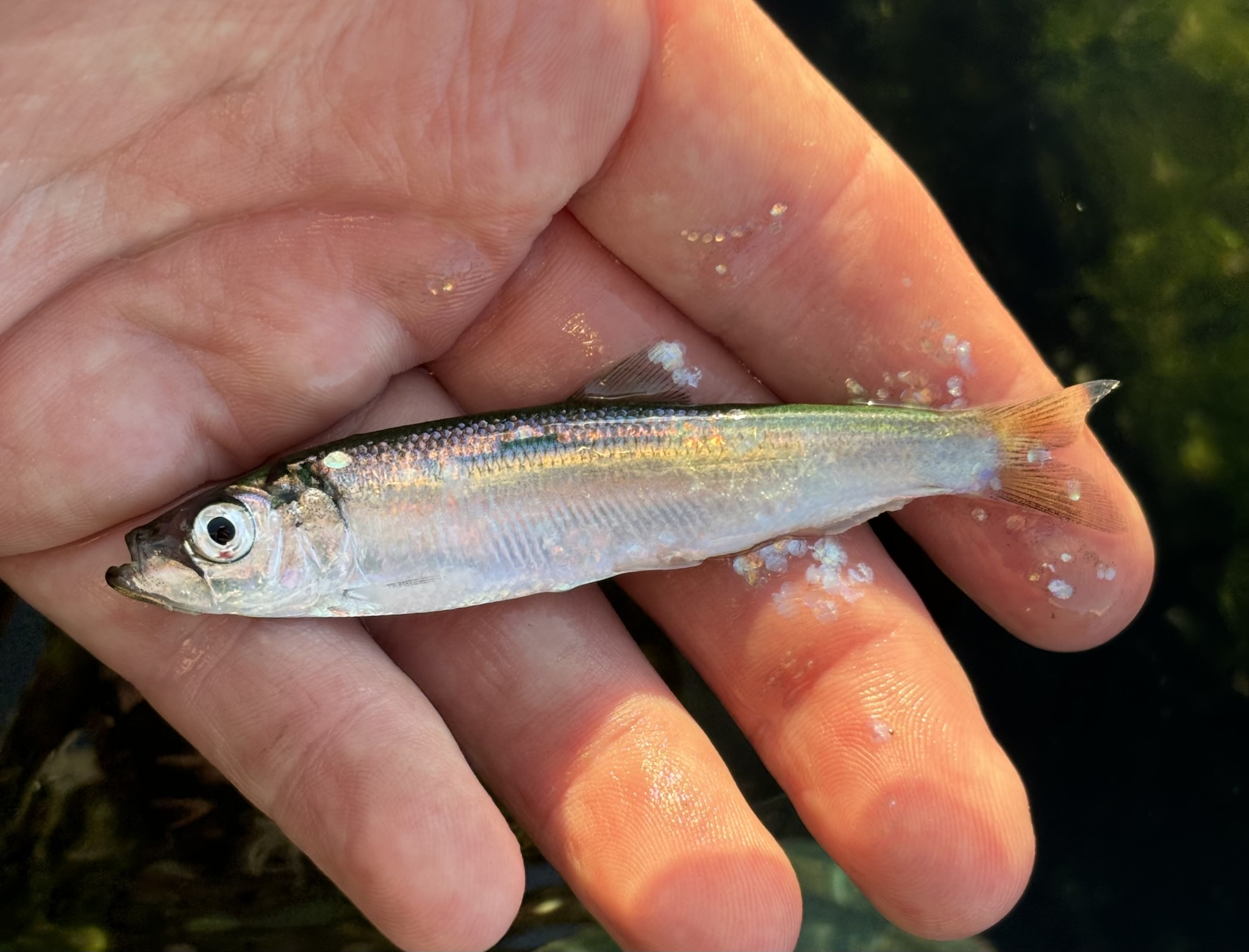
A young herring

In Polish cuisine, moskalik, usually plural (e.g., in sales), moskaliki is a very small pickled herring (marinated or salted after entrails and head removed).

Historically, "moskalik" was associated with poor people's food.

Moskaliki are very young and small fishes of size up to 5 inches, which are used in culinary as wholes, only with entrails and head removed. Because of this, a small time is required for marinating. The bones soften enough, eliminating the danger of choking, making moskaliki a convenient party snack. They have less of the taste of a sea fish. Due to their young age, they accumulate less mercury, a recent danger of seafood.

== See also ==
- Baltic herring
- Boquerones en vinagre
- Sprat
