= Adam Włodek =

Polish poet, editor, and translator (1922–1986)

Adam Włodek (8 August 1922, in Kraków – 19 January 1986, in Kraków) was a Polish poet, editor, and translator.

He was married to Polish Nobel Prize laureate Wisława Szymborska between 1948 and 1954. He published 10 books, mostly collections of his poems. He was also the editor of several Polish newspapers including Dziennik Polski, and translated works from Czech and Slovak languages into Polish.
