= Gołuchów Castle =

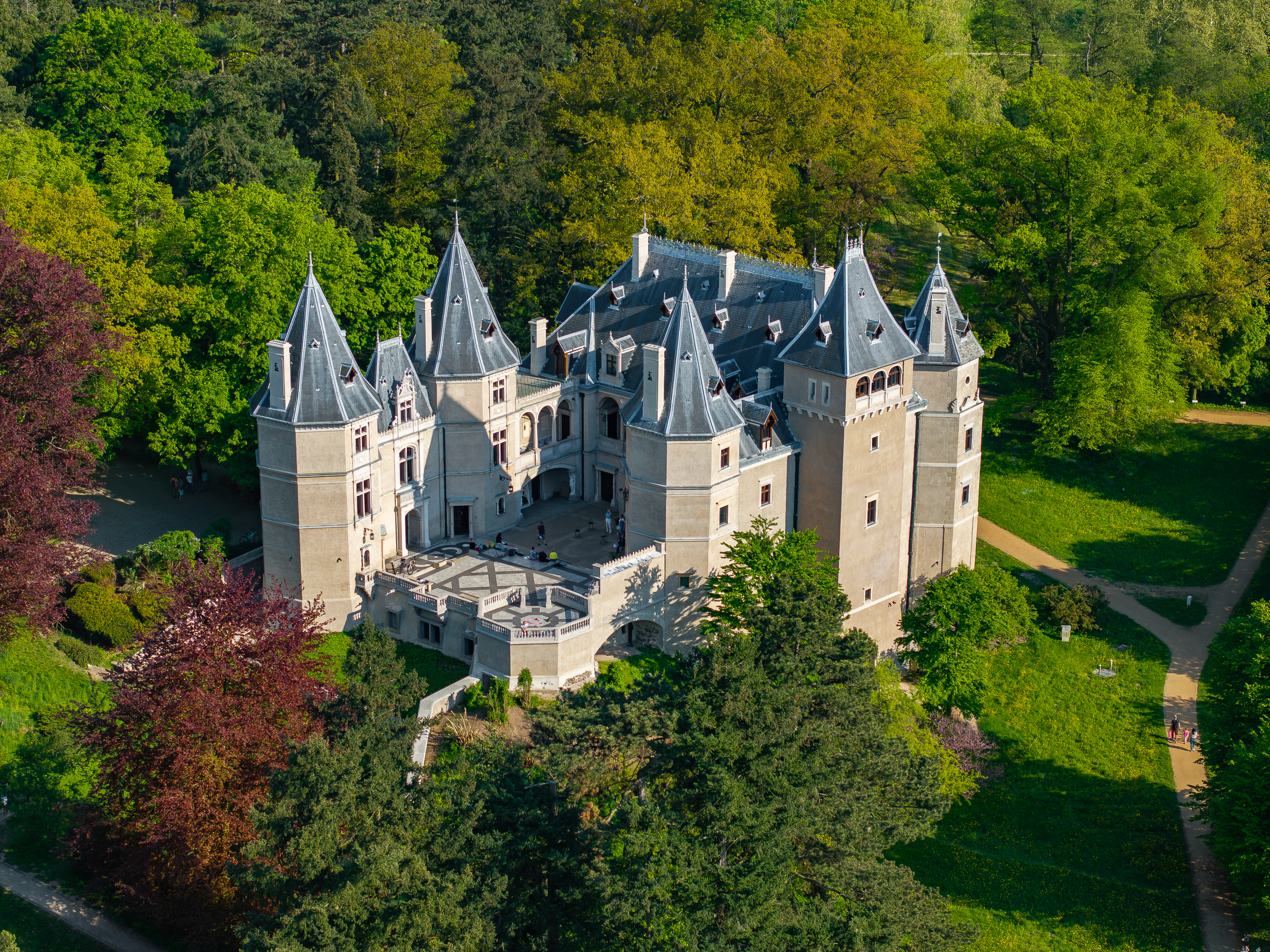
- Gołuchów Castle

- Location of the Gołuchów Castle Poland Gołuchów Castle (Greater Poland Voivodeship)
- 51°51′09″N 17°56′00″E
- Location: Gołuchów, Greater Poland Voivodeship, in Poland

History
- Built: 1550-1560

Site notes
- Architectural style: Renaissance

Gołuchów Castle (Polish: Zamek w Gołuchowie) is an early Renaissance castle in Gołuchów, Greater Poland Voivodeship, Poland. It was built in 1550-1560 for Rafał Leszczyński on a square plan and used as a defensive stronghold and residence. It was the residence of the prominent Polish magnate families of Leszczyński, Działyński and Czartoryski, and now serves as a museum.

== History ==
This early-Renaissance castle was raised in between 1550-1560 close by Trzemna, as small river and estuary of the Prosna. The building was built for Voivode of the Brześć Kujawski Voivodeship, Rafał Leszczyński. The castle was predominantly used for defensive purposes with keeps in the corners of the structure. Leszczyński's son Wacław, the subsequent owner, expanded the residence – making the residence into a magnate Renaissance stronghold.

In 1853, the partially run-down castle was bought by Count Tytus Działyński, for his son Count Jan Kantega Działyński and his wife, Princess Izabela Czartoryska. The castle was reconstructed between 1872-1885, in the style of the French Renaissance according to the design of Eugène Viollet-le-Duc in collaboration with Maurycy Ouradou and Zygmunt Gorgolewski. The residence is surrounded by a 158-hecatre landscape park, the largest one in Greater Poland Voivodeship, designed by Adam Kubaszewski, which asserted additional Romanesque and English architectural styles upon the castle. In 1939, the private museum located in the castle was plundered by Nazi Germans. Parts of the collection were subsequently recovered in the 1950s and 1960s. After the Second World War, the castle has served as a branch of the National Museum in Poznań (Polish: Muzeum Narodowe w Poznaniu).

In 2016, the castle was bought by the Polish State Treasury from the Princes Czartoryski Foundation for PLN 20 million.

== Gallery ==
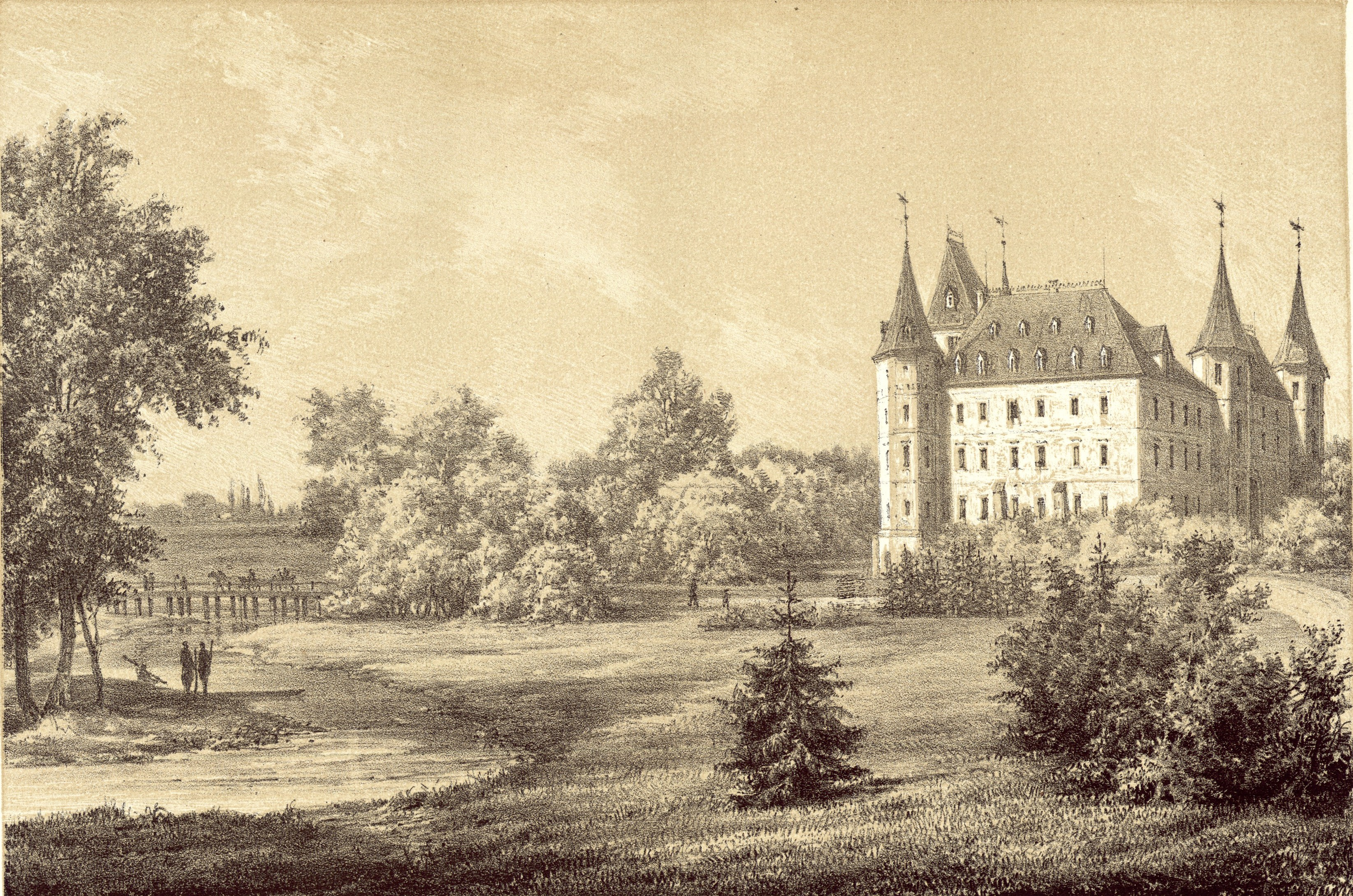
Gołuchów Castle by Napoleon Orda, 1880

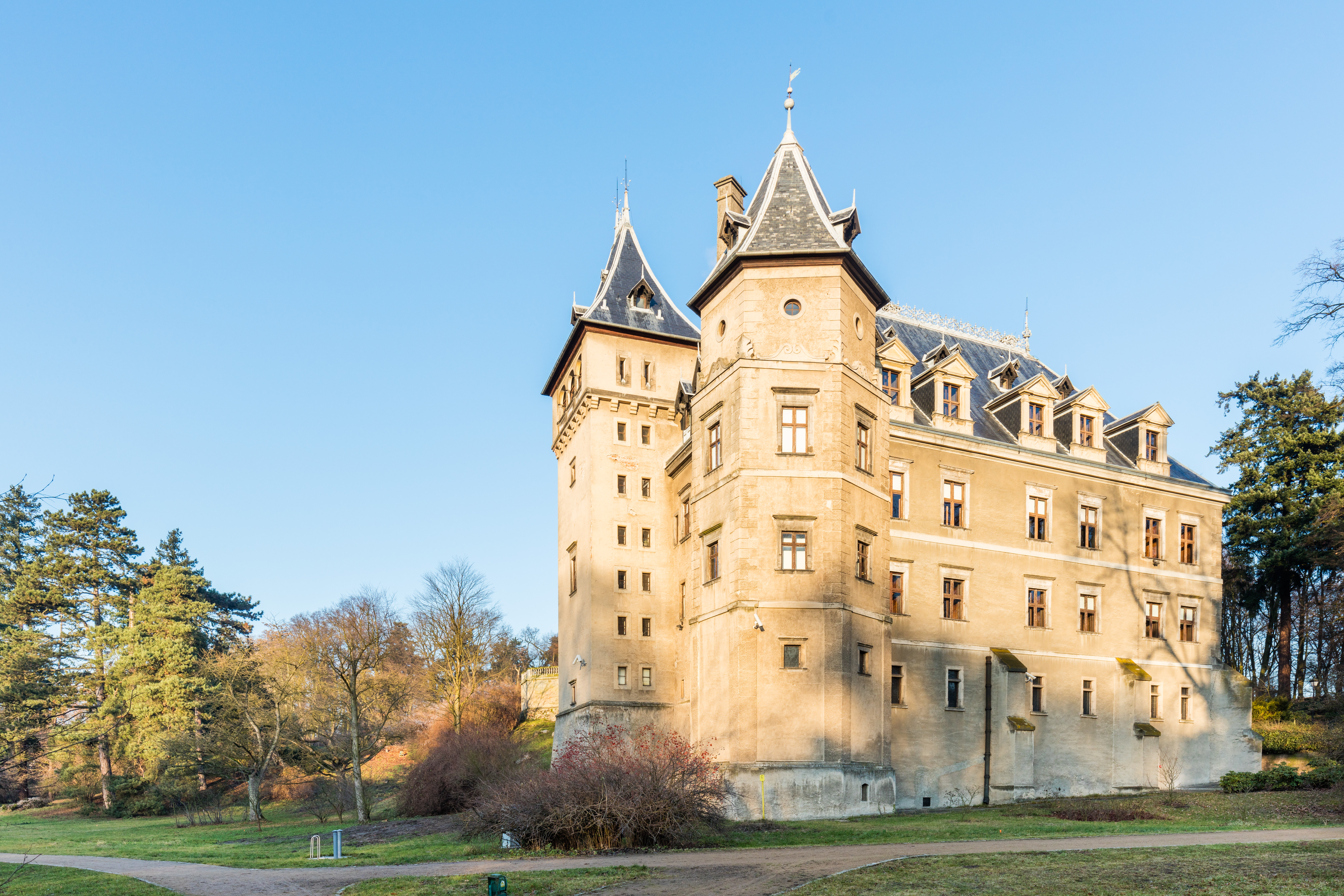
French renaissance-style Castle

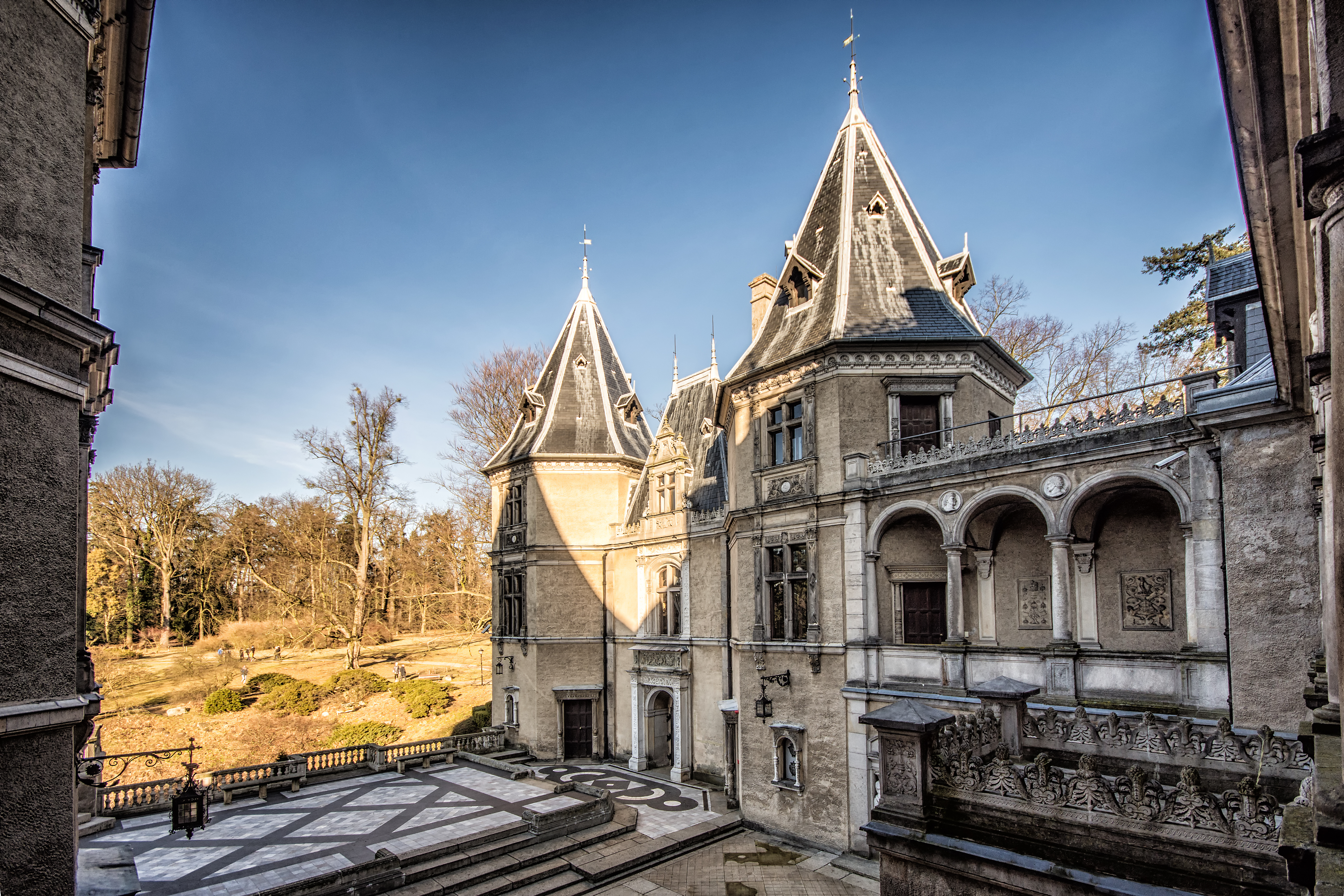
Inner courtyard

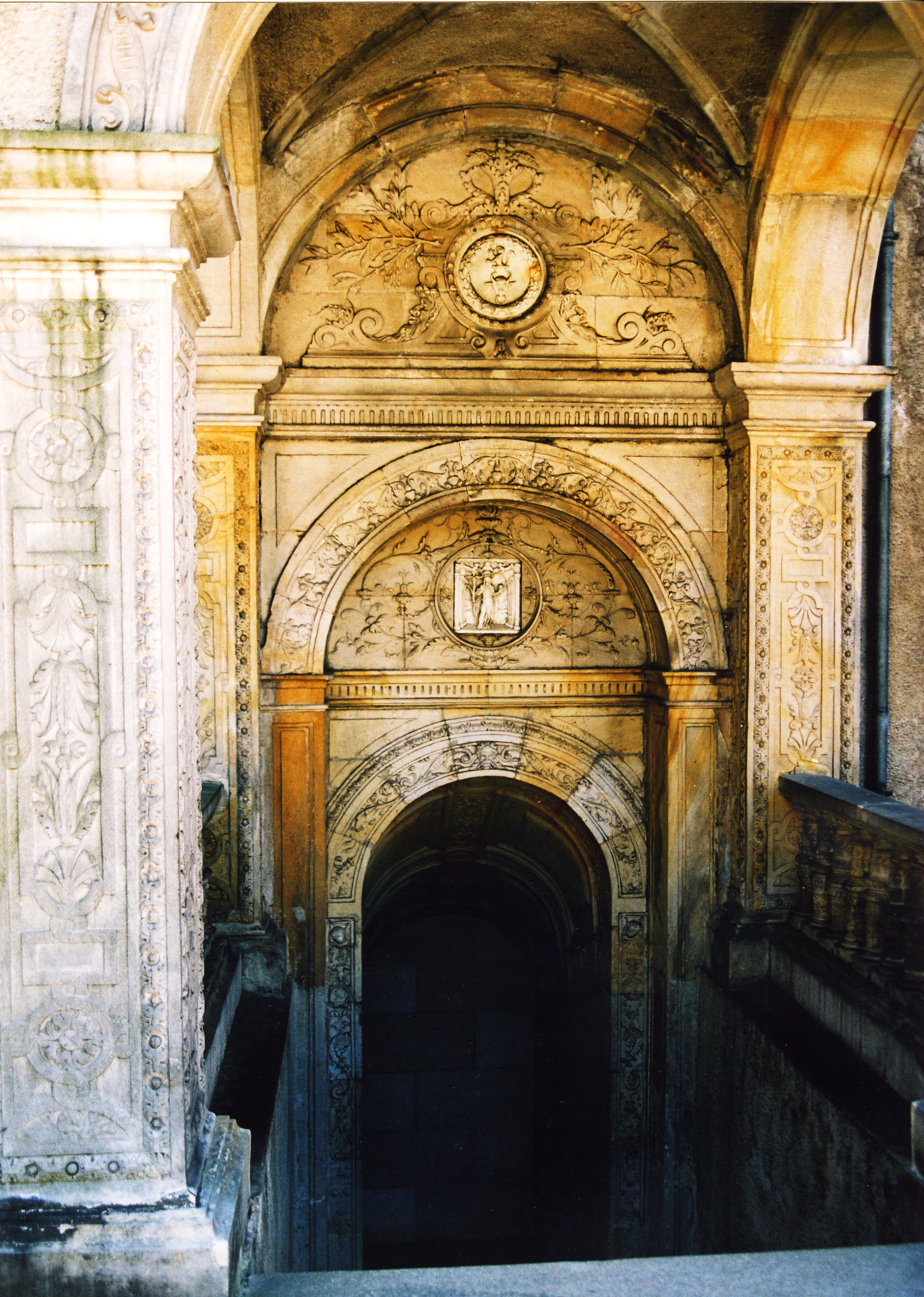
Neo-renaissance decorations of the facade

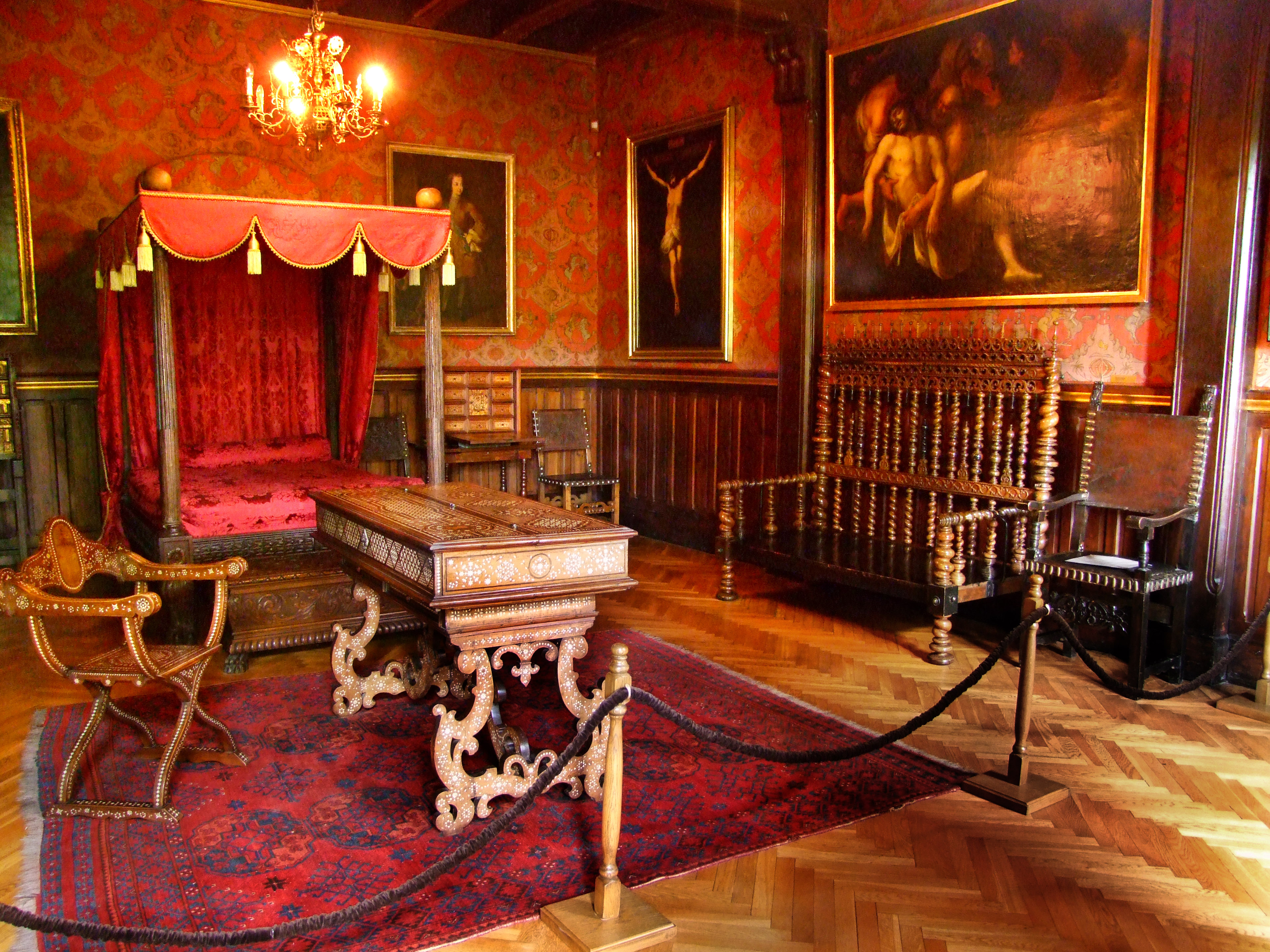
Bedroom with 17th-century Spanish furniture

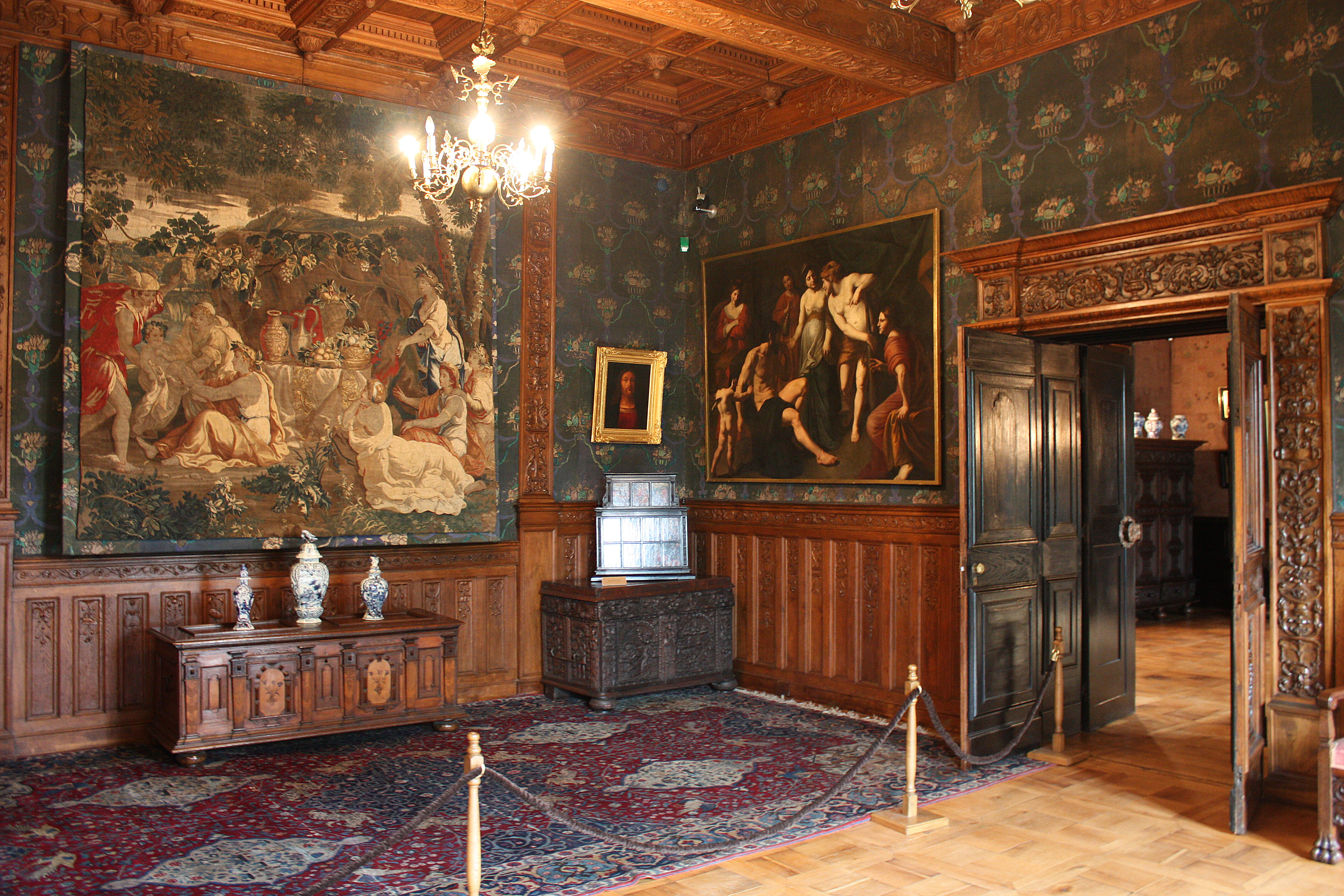
19th-century coffered ceiling and 18th-century tapestry

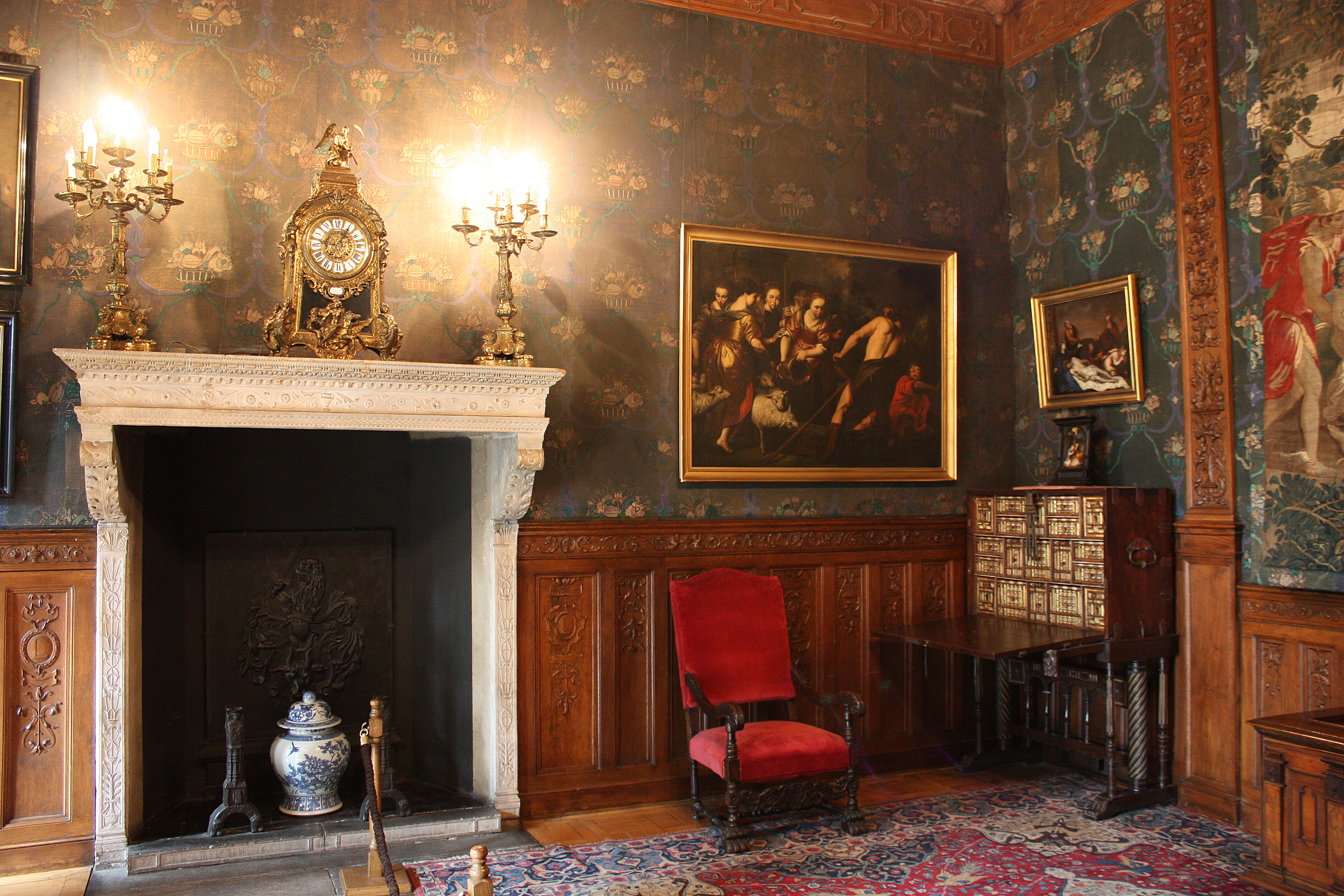
Castle interiors

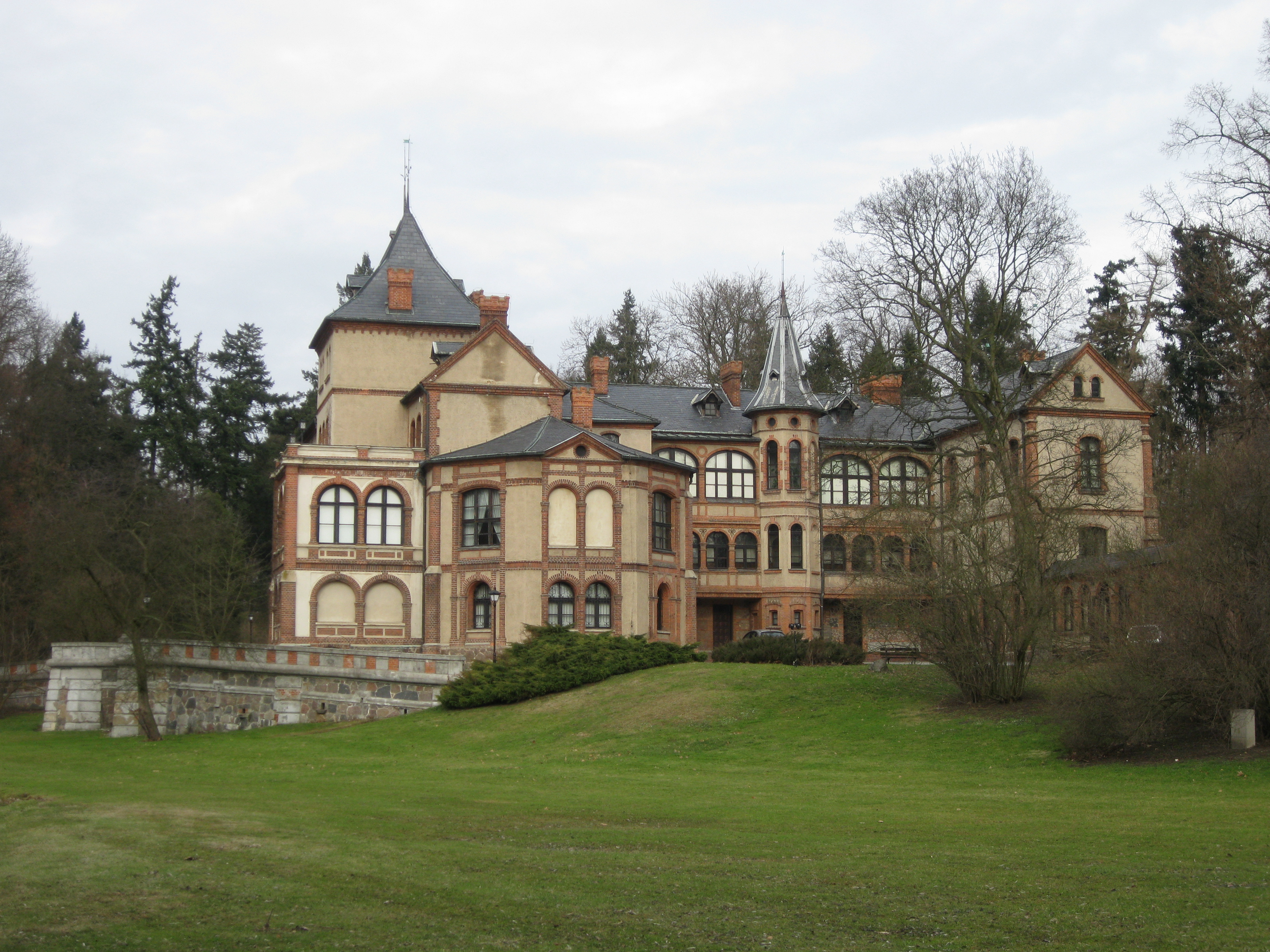
An outbuilding near the castle

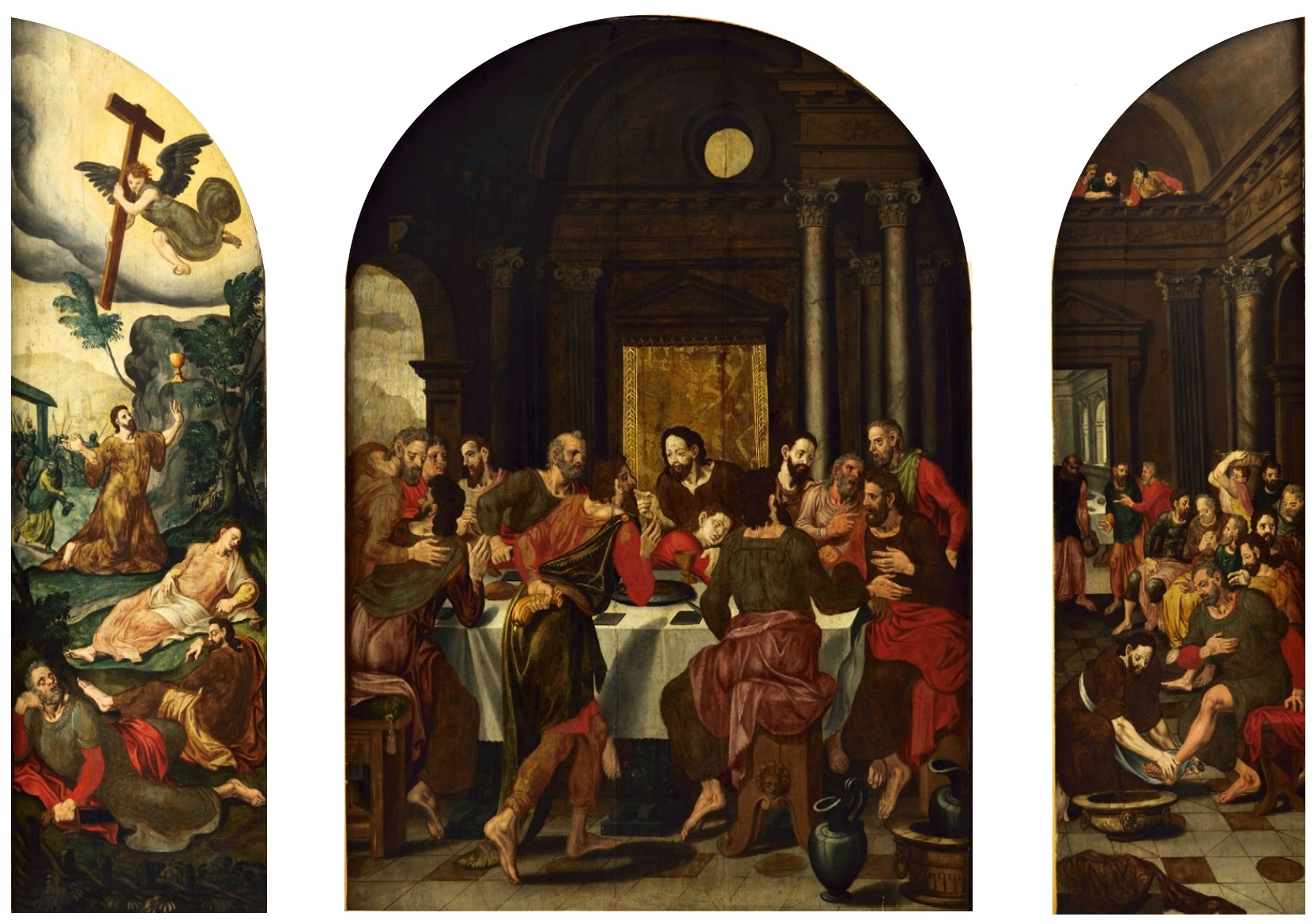
The Last Supper by Frans Floris, 16th century

== See also ==
- Castles in Poland
