= Gołuchów, Greater Poland Voivodeship =

Gołuchów
- Village
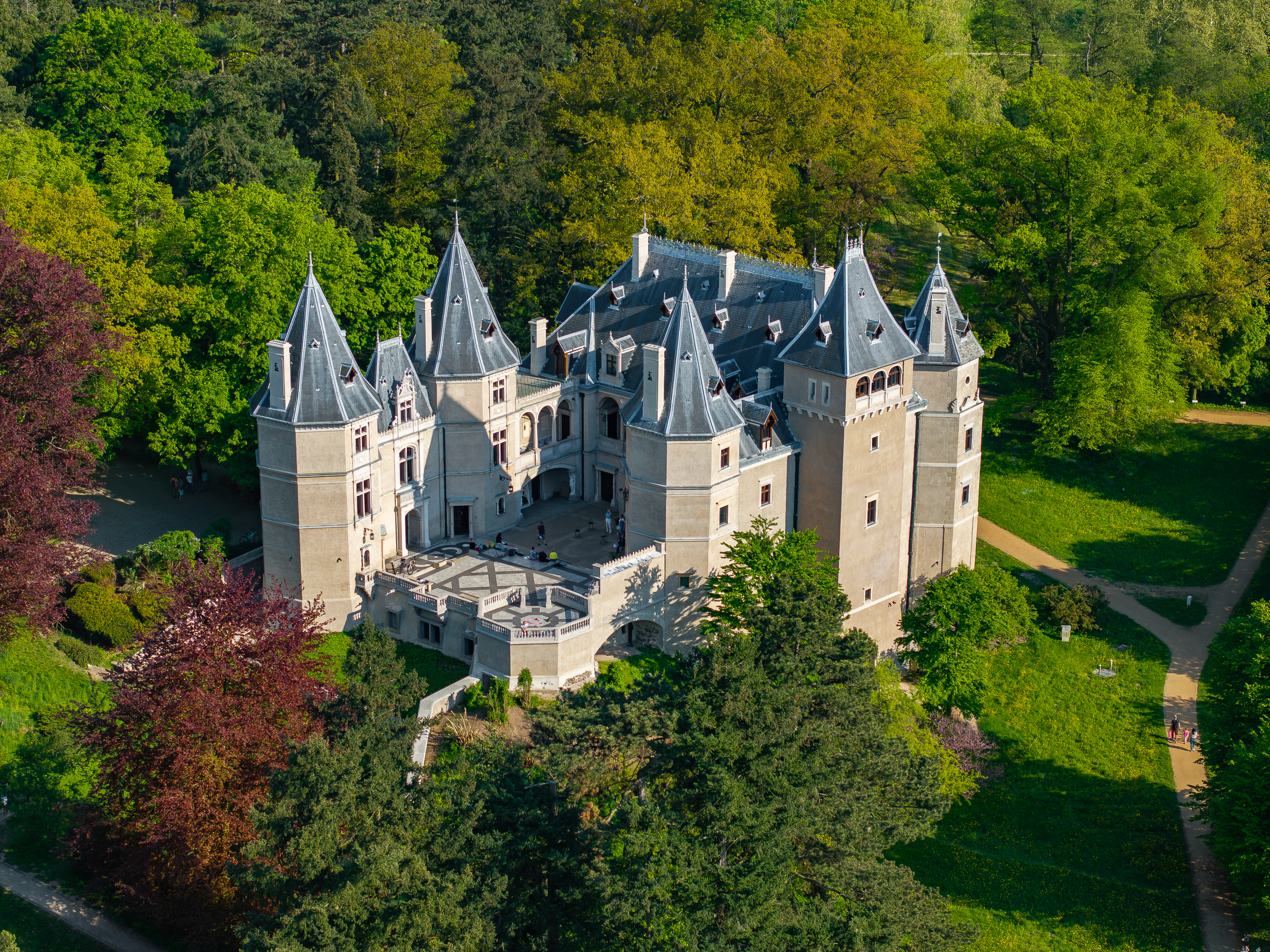
- Gołuchów Castle

- Coat of arms

- Location within Poland
- Coordinates: 51°50′58″N 17°55′53″E
- Country: Poland
- Voivodeship: Greater Poland
- County: Pleszew
- Gmina: Gołuchów
- Elevation: 120 m (390 ft)

Population (approx.)
  - Total: 2,178 (10 January 2,005)
- Time zone: UTC+1 (CET)
  - Summer (DST): UTC+2 (CEST)
- Website: http://www.goluchow.pl

Gołuchów [ɡɔˈwuxuf] is a village in Pleszew County, Greater Poland Voivodeship, in central Poland. It is the seat of the gmina (administrative district) called Gmina Gołuchów.

The village has an approximate population of 2,200 (2005) and is renowned for its fairy-tale castle, former residence of the prominent Polish magnate families of Leszczyński, Działyński and Czartoryski.
